= List of women artists exhibited at the 1893 World's Columbian Exposition =

Women artists competing for awards at the 1893 World's Columbian Exposition submitted their work to juries at appropriate buildings. Women artists were represented in the Palace of Fine Arts, along with their fellow countrymen. Women exhibited painting and sculpture throughout the Fair.

The Woman's Building did not have a juried exhibition, but lobbied to have artists of the day submit their work for the "Court of Honor". Women also contributed to the decoration and statuary throughout the Woman's Building.

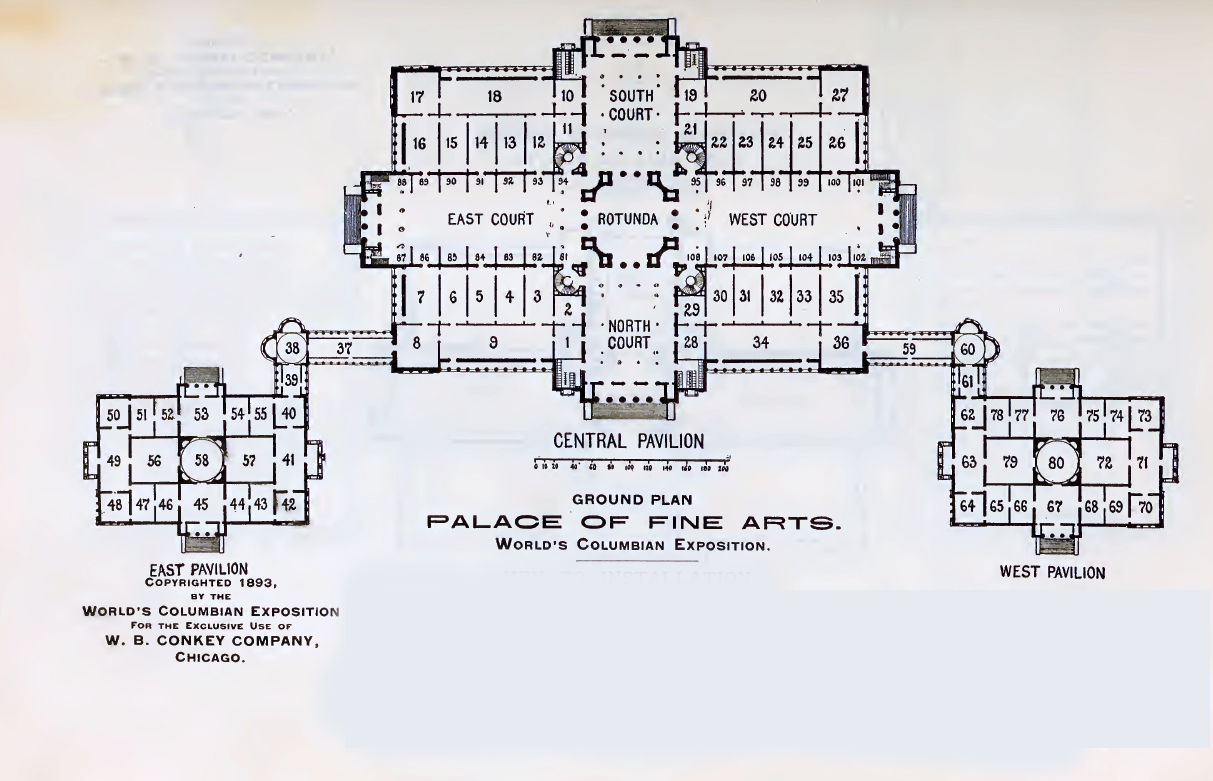
Floor Plan of the Palace of Fine Arts, World's Columbian Exposition, 1893

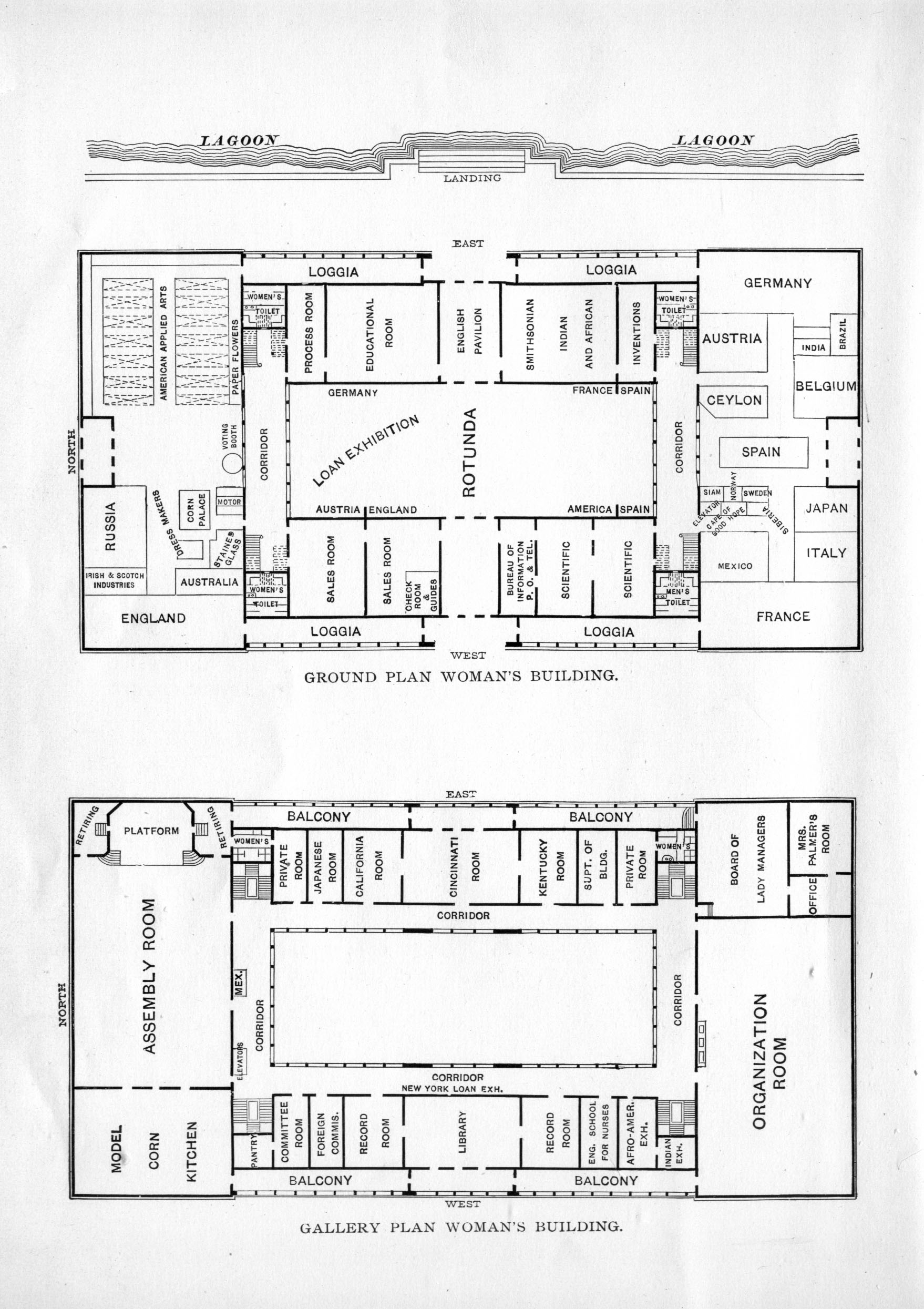
Floor Plan and Ground Plan of The Woman's Building, World's Columbian Exposition, 1893

== Women artists in the Palace of Fine Arts ==
List of Women artist exhibiting at the Palace of Fine Arts, by country.

== Austria ==
B

- Tina Blau – painting

F

- Camilla Friedländer – painting

L

- Hermine Lang-Laris – painting

W

- Olga Wisinger-Florian – painting

== Belgium ==
A

- Berthe Art – painting

B

- Euphrosine Beernaert – painting
- Marie de Bièvre – painting
- Nathalie de Bourtzoff – painting
- Sophie de Bourtzoff – painting

C

- Marie Collart – painting

D

- Marguerite Dielman – painting

G

- Hélène Gevers – painting

H

- Louise Heger – painting
- Louise De Hem – painting

M

- Georgette Meunier – painting
- Camille van Mulders – painting

R

- Félicie Ransy-Putzeys – painting
- Alice Ronner – painting
- Augusta Roszmann – painting

V

- Emma De Vigne – painting

W

- Juliette Wytsman – painting

== Canada ==
D

- Mary Dignam – painting

E

- Mary Alexandra Bell Eastlake – painting

M

- Emma May Martin – painting
- Laura Muntz Lyall – painting

R

- Mary Hiester Reid – painting

S

- Gertrude Spurr Cutts – painting

== Denmark ==
A

- Anna Ancher – painting

D

- Augusta Dohlmann – painting

F

- Edma Froelich Stage – painting

H

- Sophie Holten – painting

K

- Elise Konstantin-Hansen – painting
- Johanne Cathrine Krebs – painting

L

- Mimi Schwartzkopf Larsen – painting

P

- Anna Petersen – painting

T

- Nicoline Tuxen – painting

W

- Elisabeth Wandel – painting
- Bertha Wegmann – painting

== France ==
B

- Juliette Bonheur – painting
- Rosa Bonheur – painting
- Berthe Burgkan – painting

C

- Marie Cazin – painting, sculpture

D

- Virginie Demont-Breton – painting

H

- Joséphine Houssay – painting

I

- Jeanne Itasse-Broquet – sculpture

L

- Élodie La Villette – painting
- Madeleine Lemaire – painting
- Marie Louveau-Rouveyre – painting

P

- Gabrielle Poynot – painting

R

- Hortense Richard – painting
- Jeanne Rongier – painting

W

- Emilie Jenny Weyl – sculpture

== Germany ==
B

- Hermine Biedermann-Arendts – painting

C

- Helene Cramer – painting
- Molly Cramer – painting

G

- Fanny Edle von Geiger-Weishaupt – painting

H

- Ernestine Hirschler-Kunwald – painting
- Margarethe Hormuth-Kallmorgen – painting

L

- Vilma Lwoff-Parlaghy – painting

R

- Doris Raab – painting

S

- Gertrud Staats – painting

== Great Britain ==
A

- Helen Allingham – painting
- Anna Alma-Tadema – painting
- Laura Theresa Alma-Tadema – painting

B

- Lady Elizabeth Butler – painting

C

- Louisa Starr Canziani – painting
- Milly Childers – painting
- Ellen Gertrude Cohen – painting
- Edith Corbet – painting

D

- Jane Mary Dealy – painting
- Mary Elizabeth Duffield-Rosenberg – painting

F

- Elizabeth Forbes – painting

G

- Maude Goodman – painting
- Mary Gow – painting
- Marchioness of Granby – painting
- Kate Greenaway – painting

J

- Louise Jopling – painting

L

- Marie Seymour Lucas – painting

M

- Jessie Macgregor – painting
- Madeline Marrable – painting
- Edith Martineau – painting
- Clara Montalba – painting
- Henrietta Montalba – sculpture

O

- Emily Mary Osborn – painting

P

- Florence Pash – painting
- Kate Perugini – painting
- Elizabeth Piper – painting

R

- Henrietta Rae – painting
- Flora Macdonald Reid – painting
- Ellis Rowan – painting

S

- Alice Squire – painting
- Marie Spartali Stillman – painting
- Marianne Stokes – painting
- Annie Swynnerton – painting

T

- Helen Thornycroft – painting

W

- Mary Lemon Waller – painting
- Henrietta Ward – painting
- Kate Mary Whitley – painting
- Eleanor Stuart Wood – painting

T

- Annie Marie Youngman – painting

== Holland ==
A

- Anna Adelaïde Abrahams – painting

B

- Gerardina Jacoba van de Sande Bakhuyzen – painting
- Marie Bilders-van Bosse – painting
- Kate Bisschop-Swift – painting

H

- Adrienne van Hogendorp-s' Jacob – painting
- Barbara Elisabeth van Houten – painting
- Bramine Hubrecht – painting
- Arina Hugenholtz – painting

M

- Geesje Mesdag-van Calcar – painting
- Sientje Mesdag-van Houten – painting
- Wally Moes – painting

R

- Henriëtte Ronner-Knip – painting
- Margaretha Roosenboom – painting

S

- Thérèse Schwartze – painting

== Italy ==
- Maria Martinetti – painting
- Cora Slocomb di Brazza/Brazza Cooperative Lace Schools – lacemaking

== Norway ==
B

- Harriet Backer – painting

F

- Mimi Falsen – painting

K

- Kitty Lange Kielland – painting
- Oda Krohg – painting

R

- Helga Marie Ring Reusch – painting

S

- Agnes Steineger – painting

T

- Marie Tannæs – painting

== Russia ==
D

- Maria Lvovna Dillon – sculpture

K

- Sophia Ivanovna Kramskaya – painting

P

- Helena Polienoff – painting

W

- Helena Wrangel (Elena Karlovna Vrangel) – painting

== Spain ==
A

- Julia Alcayde y Montoya – painting
- Fernanda Frances Arribas – painting

P

- Maria Pirala – painting

== Sweden ==
B

- Anna Boberg – painting
- Eva Bonnier – painting

C

- Mina Carlson-Bredberg – painting
- Emma Chadwick – painting

G

- Anna Gardell-Ericson – painting

H

- Hanna Hirsch-Pauli – painting

J

- Ellen Jolin – painting

K

- Elisabeth Keyser – painting

M

- Ida Matton – sculpture

S

- Ida von Schulzenheim – painting
- Emma Josepha Sparre – painting

W

- Charlotte Wahlström – painting

== United States ==
B

- Ellen Kendall Baker – painting
- Mary Katherine Baker – painting
- Cecilia Beaux – painting
- Enella Benedict – painting
- Susan Hinckley Bradley – painting
- Amy Aldis Bradley – sculpture
- Fidelia Bridges – painting
- Carol Brooks – sculpture
- Carrie L. Brooks – sculpture
- Caroline Shawk Brooks – sculpture
- Matilda Browne – painting

C

- Katharine Carl – painting
- Josephine Granger Cochrane – painting
- Elizabeth Coffin – painting
- Katherine M. Cohen – sculpture
- Charlotte B. Coman – painting
- Anna Botsford Comstock – painting
- Lucy Scarborough Conant – painting
- Emma Lampert Cooper – painting
- Ellen Rankin Copp – sculpture
- Louise Howland Cox – painting
- Caroline A. Cranch – painting

D

- Ann Sophia Towne Darrah – painting
- Julia McEntee Dillon – painting
- Sarah Paxton Ball Dodson – painting
- Pauline Amalie Dohn – painting
- Mattie Thweatt Dubé – painting
- Fannie Eliza Duvall – painting

E

- Susan Macdowell Eakins – painting
- Lydia Field Emmet – painting

F

- Harriet Campbell Foss – painting
- Mary Odenheimer Fowler – painting
- Lucia Fairchild Fuller – painting

G

- Elizabeth Jane Gardner – painting
- Mariquita Gill – painting
- Rosalie Lorraine Gill – painting
- Kathleen Honora Greatorex – painting
- Lillian S. Greene – painting

H

- Johanna Woodwell Hailman – painting
- Ellen Day Hale – painting
- Ida C. Haskell – painting
- Adele M. von Helmold – painting
- Lucy D. Holme – painting
- Edith M. W. Howes – painting

J

- Hannah Tempest Jenkins – painting
- Annie Weaver Jones – painting

K

- Alice De Wolf Kellogg – painting
- Elizabeth Macdowell Kenton – painting
- Susan Merrill Ketcham – painting
- Anna Elizabeth Klumpke – painting

L

- Ella Condie Lamb – painting
- Clara Welles Lathrop – painting
- Laura Lee – painting
- Lucy Lee-Robbins – painting
- May Hallowell Loud – painting
- Anna Lownes – painting

M

- Florence MacKubin – painting
- Mary Fairchild MacMonnies Low – painting
- Mary Lizzie Macomber – painting
- Harriet Randolph Hyatt Mayor – sculpture
- Clara Taggart MacChesney – painting
- M. Evelyn McCormick – painting
- Anna Lea Merritt – painting

N

- Marie H. Guise Newcomb – painting
- Rhoda Holmes Nicholls – painting
- Eleanor Norcross – painting
- Elizabeth Nourse – painting

P

- Clara Weaver Parrish – painting
- Bertha E. Perrie – painting
- Lilla Cabot Perry – painting
- Helen Watson Phelps – painting
- Caroline W. Pitkin – painting
- Katherine T. Hooper Prescott – sculpture
- Sarah Gooll Putnam – painting

R

- Theodora Alice Ruggles – sculpture

S

- Emily Sartain – painting
- Emily Maria Spaford Scott – painting
- Jeannette Scott – painting
- Sarah Choate Sears – painting
- Luella A. Varney Serrao – sculpture
- Amanda Brewster Sewell – painting
- Annie Shepley Omori – painting
- Rosina Emmet Sherwood – painting
- Winnaretta Singer – painting
- Alice Barber Stephens – painting

T

- Fanny Tewksbury – painting
- Frances Hunt Throop – painting

V

- Bessie Potter Vonnoh – sculpture

W

- Caroline Dupee Wade – painting
- Adelaide E. Wadsworth – painting
- Ida Waugh – painting
- Sarah W. Whitman – painting
- Anne Whitney – sculpture
- Adeline Albright Wigand – painting

== Women artists in the Woman's Building ==
List of Women artists exhibiting at the Woman's Building, by country.

== Austria ==
B

- Minna Budinsky – painting

E

- Marie Egner – painting
- Marianne von Eschenburg – painting

F

- Hedwig Friedländer – painting

K

- Ernestine von Kirchsberg – painting
- Broncia Koller-Pinell – painting
- Irma Komlosy – painting

L

- Lea von Littrow – painting

M

- Rosa Mayreder – painting
- Bertha Müller – painting

P

- Adrienne von Pötting – painting

S

- Hermine von Schnell – painting
- Rosa Schweninger – painting
- Josefine Swoboda – painting

W

- Olga Wisinger-Florian – painting

== Belgium ==
A

- Berthe Art – painting

B

- Euphrosine Beernaert – painting
- Marie de Bièvre – painting

C

- Marie Collart – painting

H

- Louise De Hem – painting

L

- Fanny Laumans – painting

M

- Georgette Meunier – painting
- Camille van Mulders – painting

R

- Félicie Ransy-Putzeys – painting

W

- Juliette Wytsman – painting

== Cuba ==
M

- Elvira Martinez de Melero – painting

== Denmark ==
L

- Louise (Queen of Denmark) – painting

== France ==
A

- Louise Abbéma – painting

B

- Marie Bashkirtseff – painting
- Sarah Bernhardt – sculpture
- Hélène Bertaux – sculpture
- Rosa Bonheur – painting
- Marthe Boyer-Breton – painting
- Marie Bracquemond – painting
- Laure Lapierre Brouardel – painting
- Julie J. Buchet – painting

C

- Zoé-Laure de Chatillon – painting
- Uranie Alphonsine Colin-Libour – painting
- Jeanne Contal – painting
- Laure Coutan-Montorgueil – sculpture
- Delphine Arnould de Cool-Fortin – painting

D

- Virginie Demont-Breton – painting

G

- Maximilienne Guyon – painting

H

- Joséphine Houssay – painting
- Mme. Clovis Hugues (Jeanne Royannez) – sculpture

I

- Camille Cornelie Isbert – painting
- Jeanne Itasse-Broquet – sculpture

L

- Élodie La Villette – painting
- Madeleine Lemaire – painting

M

- Euphémie Muraton – painting

R

- Hortense Richard – painting
- Jeanne Rongier – painting

T

- Marguerite Turner – painting

V

- Frédérique Vallet-Bisson – painting
- Jenny Villebesseyx – painting

Z

- Jenny Zillhardt – painting

== Germany ==
B

- Carola Baer-von Mathes – painting
- Jeanna Bauck – painting
- Luise Begas-Parmentier – painting
- Hanna Bieber-Böhm – painting
- Paula Bonte – painting

C

- Helene Cramer – painting
- Molly Cramer – painting

F

- Clara Elisabeth Fischer – painting

H

- Elise Neumann Hedinger – painting
- Dora Hitz – painting
- Margarethe Hormuth-Kallmorgen – painting

K

- Maria von Kalckreuth – painting
- Marie von Keudell – painting
- Johanna Kirsch – painting

L

- Hildegard Lehnert – painting
- Sabine Lepsius-Graef – painting
- Sophie Ley – painting
- Emmy Lischke – painting
- Clara Lobedan – painting
- Margarethe Loewe-Bethe – painting
- Maria Lübbes – painting
- Auguste Ludwig – painting
- Vilma Lwoff-Parlaghy – painting

P

- Rosa Petzel – painting
- Elizabeth Poppe-Lüderitz – painting
- Hermione von Preuschen – painting

R

- Ottilie Roederstein – painting

S

- Auguste Schepp – painting
- Bertha Schrader – painting
- Liska Schroeder – painting
- Gertrud Staats – painting
- Minna Stocks – painting
- Helene Marie Stromeyer – painting

W

- Lilli Wislicenus – sculpture

== Great Britain ==
B

- Lady Elizabeth Butler – painting
- Mildred Anne Butler – painting

G

- Alice Grant – painting
- Mary R. Grant – sculpture

J

- Blanche Jenkins – painting
- Louise Jopling – painting

M

- Madeline Marrable – painting
- Clara Montalba – painting
- Ellen Montalba – painting
- Hilda Montalba – painting

O

- Emily Mary Osborn – painting

P

- Kate Perugini – painting
- Elizabeth Piper – painting

R

- Henrietta Rae – painting
- Ellen Mary Rope – sculpture

W

- Mary Seton Watts – sculpture
- Eleanor Stuart Wood – painting

== Japan ==
A

- Giokushi Atomi – painting

S

- Noguchi Shohin – painting
- Uemura Shōen – painting

== Mexico ==
- Julia Escalante – painting

== Russia ==
B

- Olga Bariatinsky (Ольга Барятинская) – painting
- Olga Beggrow-Hartmann – painting

I

- Princess A. Imeretinsky (Светлейшая княгиня Анна Александровна Имеретинская) – painting

K

- Sophia Ivanovna Kramskaya – painting

O

- Mlle. T. Olsonfieff – painting

S

- Princess Mary Schahovskoy-Strechneff (кн. Мария Шаховская-Стрешнева) – sculpture

== Spain ==
A

- Julia Alcayde y Montoya – painting

B

- Elena Brockman y Llanos – painting

F

- Fernanda Frances Arribas – painting

G

- Adela Ginés y Ortiz – painting

P

- Maria Pirala – painting

R

- María Luisa de la Riva y Callol-Muñoz – painting

== United States ==
A

- Maria a'Becket – painting
- Sarah Fisher Ames – sculpture

B

- Caroline Peddle Ball – sculpture
- Addie L. Ballou – painting
- Cecilia Beaux – painting
- Sarah E. Bender De Wolfe – painting
- Enella Benedict – painting
- Christine Sloan Bredin – painting
- Maria Matilda Brooks – painting

C

- Atha Haydock Caldwell – painting
- Katharine Carl – painting
- Mary Cassatt – painting
- Minerva J. Chapman – painting
- Sarah Anne Freeman Clarke – painting
- Gabrielle D. Clements – painting
- Charlotte B. Coman – painting
- Ellen Rankin Copp – sculpture

D

- Cornelia Cassady Davis – painting
- Blanche Dillaye – painting
- Pauline Amalie Dohn – painting

E

- Allegra Eggleston – painting
- Lydia Field Emmet – painting
- Florence Esté – painting

F

- Katherine Levin Farrell – painting
- Eurilda Loomis France – painting
- Lucia Fairchild Fuller – painting

G

- Elizabeth Jane Gardner – painting
- Rosalie Lorraine Gill – painting
- Kathleen Honora Greatorex – painting
- Alice Viola Guysi – painting
- Jeanette Guysi – painting

H

- Mary Hallock Foote – painting
- Letitia Bonnet Hart – painting
- Vinnie Ream Hoxie – sculpture

J

- Adelaide Johnson – sculpture

K

- Dora Wheeler Keith – painting
- Alice De Wolf Kellogg – painting
- Anna Elizabeth Klumpke – painting

L

- Bertha Elizabeth Stringer Lee – painting
- Edmonia Lewis – sculpture
- Caroline Augusta Lord – painting
- Anna Lownes – painting

M

- Florence MacKubin – painting
- Mary Fairchild MacMonnies Low – painting
- Retta T. Matthews – sculpture
- M. Evelyn McCormick – painting
- Mary Louise McLaughlin – painting
- Mary Maud (Ward) Means – painting
- Anna Lea Merritt – painting
- Mary Nimmo Moran – painting

N

- Phoebe Davis Natt – painting
- Blanche Nevin – sculpture
- Rhoda Holmes Nicholls – painting
- Elizabeth Nourse – painting

O

- Annie Shepley Omori – painting

P

- Caroline Amelia Powell – painting
- Katherine T. Hooper Prescott – sculpture

S

- Emily Maria Spaford Scott – painting
- Luella A. Varney Serrao – sculpture
- Amanda Brewster Sewell – painting
- Rosina Emmet Sherwood – painting
- Letta Crapo Smith – painting
- Mary Solari – painting
- Alice Barber Stephens – painting

U

- Cora Estelle Uhler – painting

V

- Emily Noyes Vanderpoel – painting
- Rebecca Newbold Van Trump – painting
- Anna Marie Valentien – sculpture

W

- Adelaide E. Wadsworth – painting
- Ida Waugh – painting
- Cecilia E. Wentworth – painting
- Annie Davenport Whelpley – painting
- Anne Whitney – sculpture

Y

- Enid Yandell – sculpture

== Unknown ==
- Adelaide Manan – sculpture

== Women artists elsewhere at the exposition ==
List of Women artists elsewhere at the exposition, by country.

== France ==
C

- Camille Claudel – sculpture

F

- Fanny Fleury – painting

R

- Jeanne Rongier – painting

== Sweden ==
- Anna Palm de Rosa – painting

== United States ==
B

- Martha Susan Baker – painting
- Caroline Peddle Ball – sculpture
- Carrie L. Brooks – sculpture
- Caroline Shawk Brooks – sculpture
- Enella Benedict – painting
- Ida Josephine Burgess – painting
- Margaret Lesley Bush-Brown – painting

C

- Alice Brown Chittenden – painting
- Gabrielle D. Clements – painting
- Ellen Rankin Copp – sculpture
- Lucia H. Coyner – painting

D

- Maria Oakey Dewing – painting
- Anna Van Cleef Dodgshun – painting
- Sarah Paxton Ball Dodson – painting
- Pauline Amalie Dohn – painting

F

- Ellen Frances Burpee Farr – painting
- Katherine Levin Farrell – painting
- Ellen Thayer Fisher – painting

G

- Frances M. Goodwin – sculpture
- Helen Barber Gregory – painting

H

- Annie Harmon – painting
- Harriet Hosmer – sculpture
- Grace Hudson – painting

J

- Lily Irene Jackson – painting
- Annie Weaver Jones – painting

K

- Charlotte Belle Emerson Keith – painting
- Alice De Wolf Kellogg – painting

L

- Mary Lawrence – sculpture
- Marie Koupal Lusk – painting

M

- Clara Taggart MacChesney – painting
- Alice Randall Marsh – painting
- Retta T. Matthews – sculpture
- M. Evelyn McCormick – painting
- Jane Roma McElroy – painting
- Mary Maud (Ward) Means – painting
- Helen Farnsworth Mears – sculpture
- Jean Pond Miner Coburn – sculpture
- Marie Madeleine Seebold Molinary – painting
- Virginia Agnes Murphy – painting

R

- Mary Herrick Ross – painting

S

- Emily Sartain – painting
- Janet Scudder – sculpture

V

- Matilda Vanderpoel – painting

W

- Caroline Dupee Wade – painting
- Julia Bracken Wendt – sculpture
- Adele Fay Williams – painting

Y

- Enid Yandell – sculpture

== Gallery ==
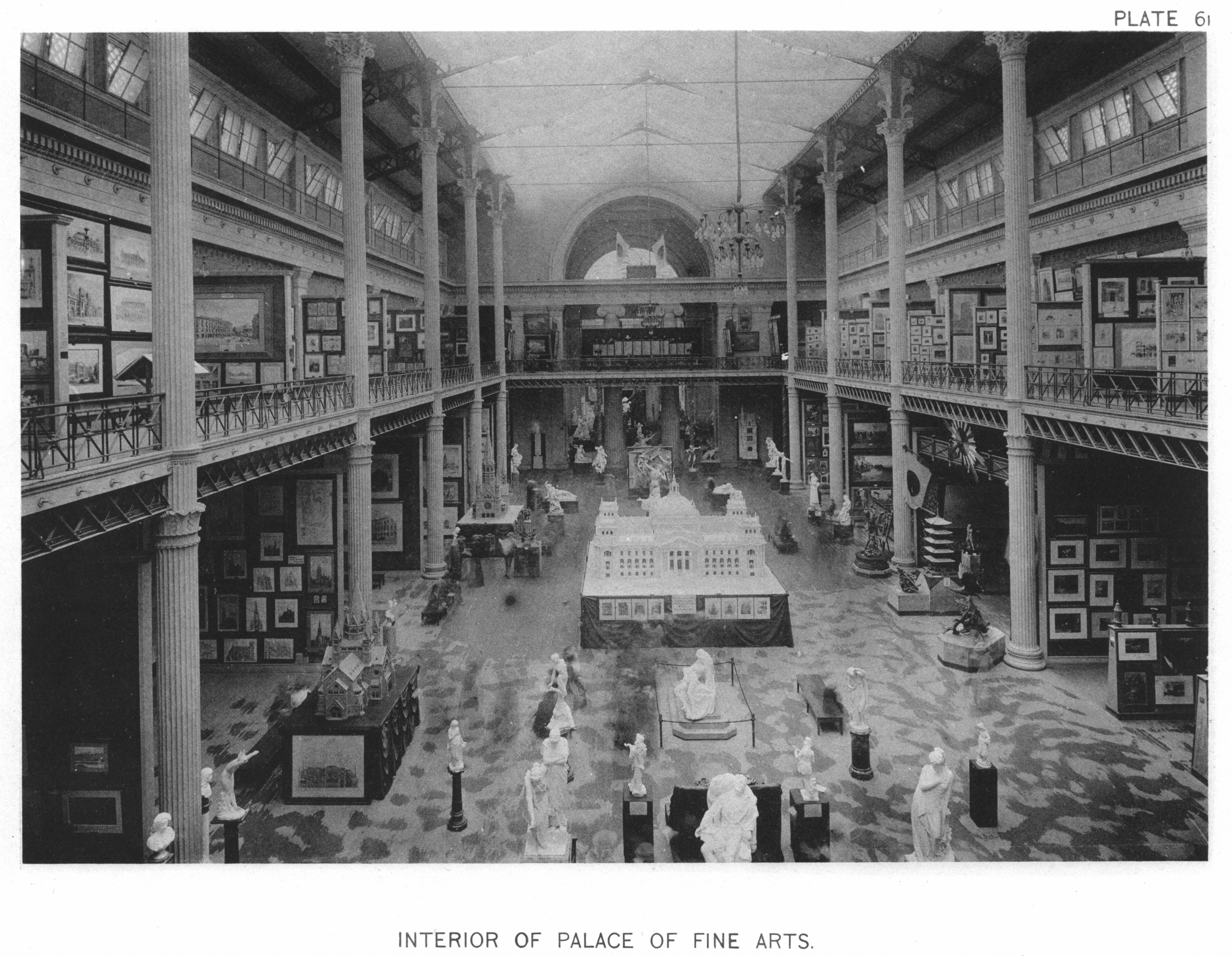
Interior Of Palace Of Fine Arts — Official Views Of The World's Columbian Exposition

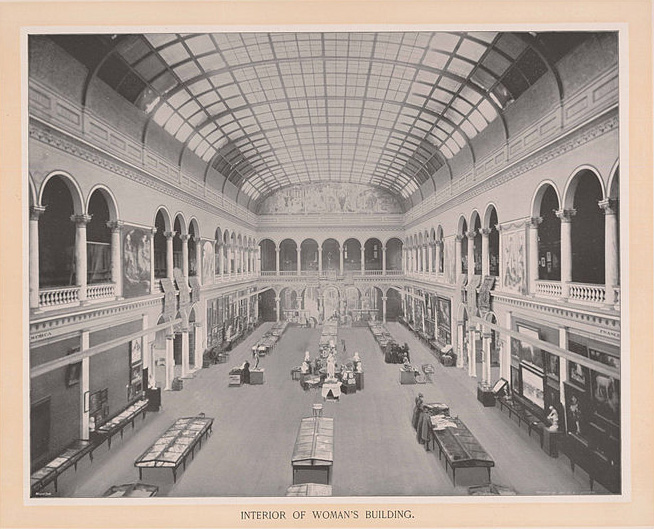
Woman's Building, Interior, William Henry Jackson, 1893
