= Euphémie Muraton =

French painter

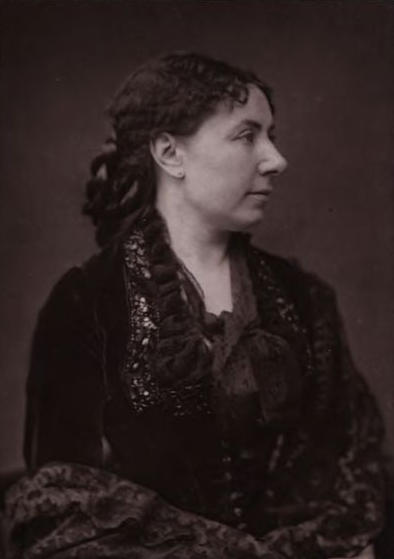
- Euphémie Muraton in 1882
- Born: 11 April 1836; Beaugency, France
- Died: 1914 (aged 77–78)
- Known for: Painting
- Spouse: Alphonse Muraton

Euphémie Muraton (née Duhanot; 1836–1914) was a French painter.

== Biography ==
Muraton was born on 11 April 1836 in Beaugency. She married fellow painter Alphonse Muraton (1824–1911) with whom she had one son, Louis Muraton, also a painter. She exhibited at the Paris Salon from 1868 to 1913. Muraton exhibited her work in the Woman's Building at the 1893 World's Columbian Exposition in Chicago, Illinois.

She died in 1914.

== Gallery ==
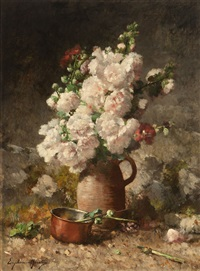
Floral Still Life with Copper Saucepan

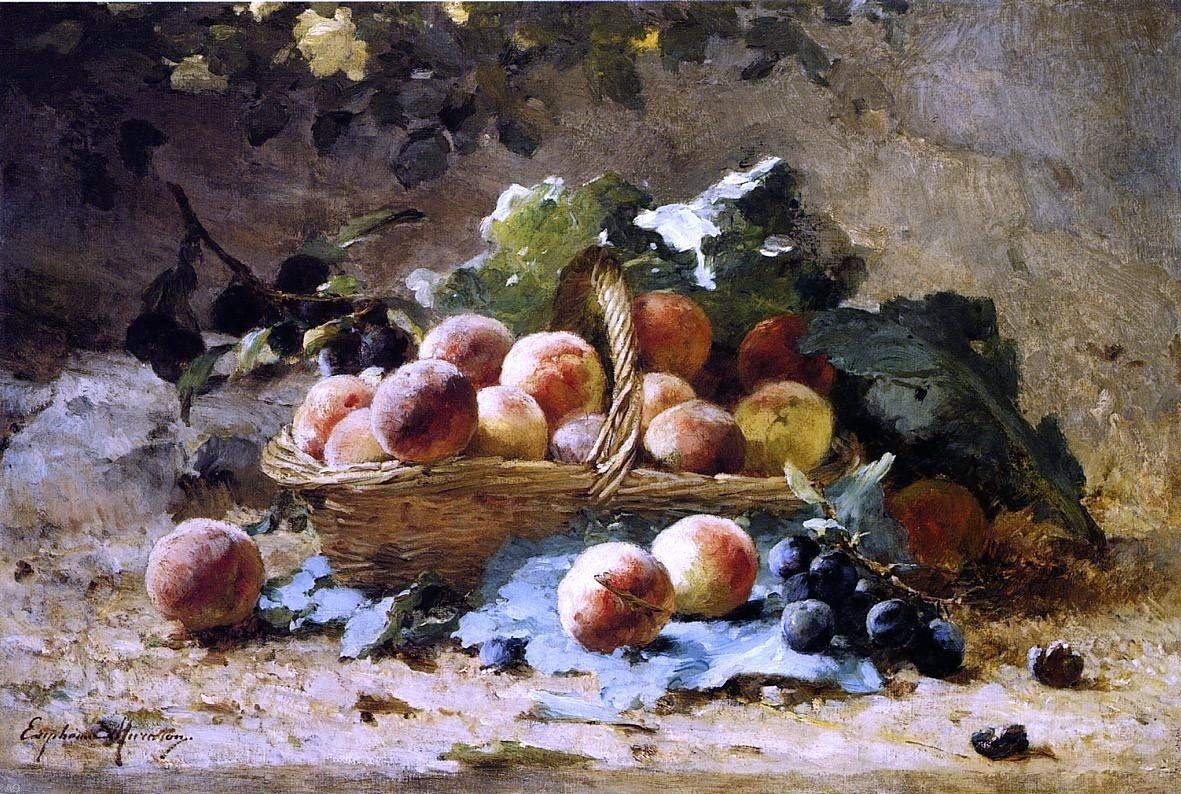
Nature morte aux pêches

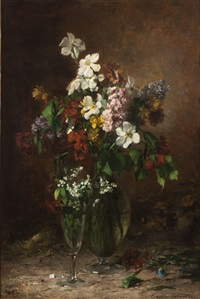
Still Life with Spring Blooms in Glass Vases

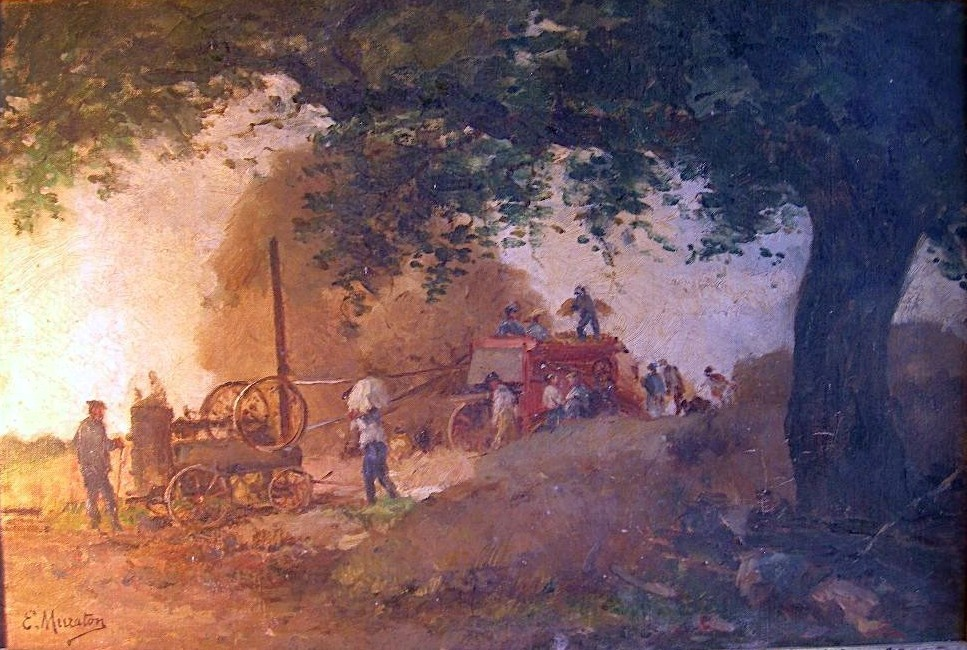
Thresher Scene
