= Maria Matilda Brooks =

American painter

- Born: 1837; Staines, England
- Died: November 16, 1913 (aged 75–76); New York, New York
- Known for: Painting

Maria Matilda Brooks (1837 – November 16, 1913) was a British-born American painter.

== Biography ==
Brooks was born in 1837 in Staines, England. She studied art in London at the South Kensington Art School and the Royal Academy Schools. She briefly lived in Canada, in Montreal and Quebec City, before moving to New York.

Brooks exhibited her work in the rotunda and the Board Room of the Woman's Building at the 1893 World's Columbian Exposition in Chicago, Illinois.

She died in New York on November 16, 1913, after being struck by an automobile.

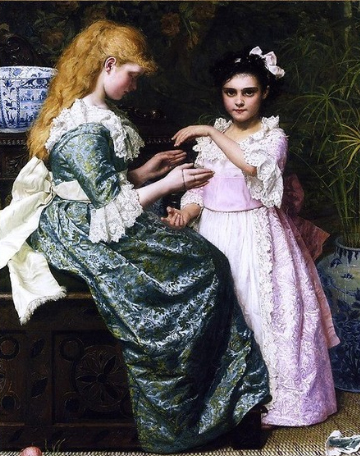
Cat's Cradle by Maria Matilda Brooks
