= Mariquita Gill =

American painter

Mariquita S. Gill
- Born: 1861; Montevideo, Uruguay
- Died: 1915 (aged 53–54); Salem, Massachusetts
- Known for: Painting
- Movement: Impressionism

Mariquita Gill (1861 - 1915) was an American painter who lived in Giverny, France during the 1890s.

== Biography ==
Gill was born in 1861 in Montevideo, Uruguay. She began studying art in Boston in the 1880s. She continued her studies at the Art Students League of New York.

In 1885 she moved to Paris where she studied at the Académie Julian. By the 1890s she had seen an exhibit of Claude Monet's work and subsequently moved to Giverny.

Gill exhibited her work at the Palace of Fine Arts at the 1893 World's Columbian Exposition in Chicago, Illinois.

Gill returned to America in 1897, settling in Massachusetts. She exhibited her work at the Art Institute of Chicago, the Pennsylvania Academy of the Fine Arts, the Copley Society of Art, the Boston Art Club, and the Society of American Artists.

Gill died in 1915 in Salem, Massachusetts.

== Legacy ==
Gill was included in the 2018 exhibit “Winter Reprieve: American Artists in Bermuda” at the Hawthorne Fine Art gallery.

== Gallery ==
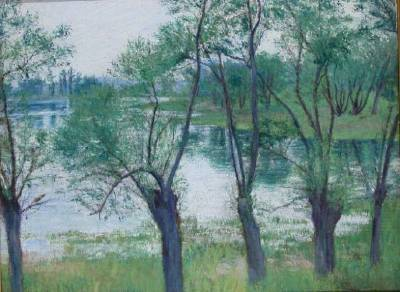
Willows by the River, Giverny

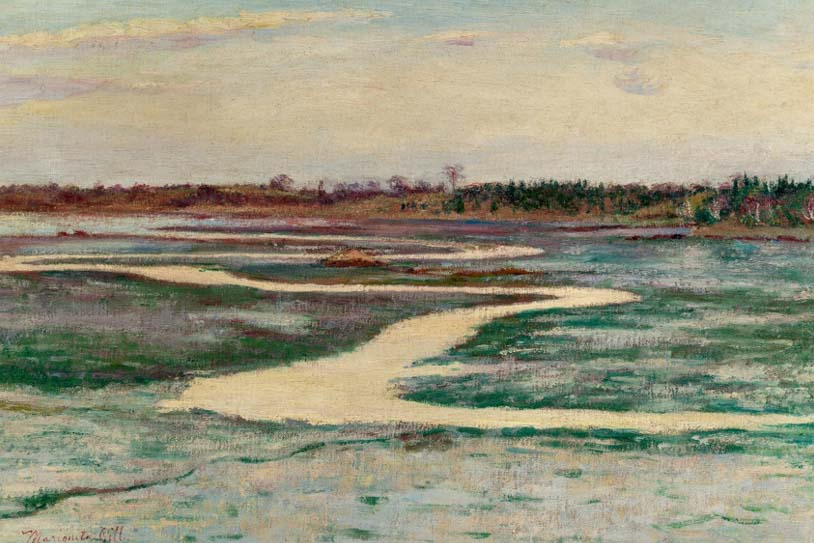
Marsh Landscape

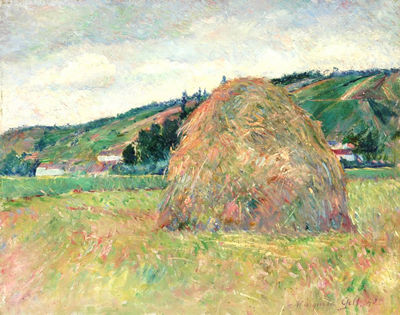
Sunlight on a Haystack

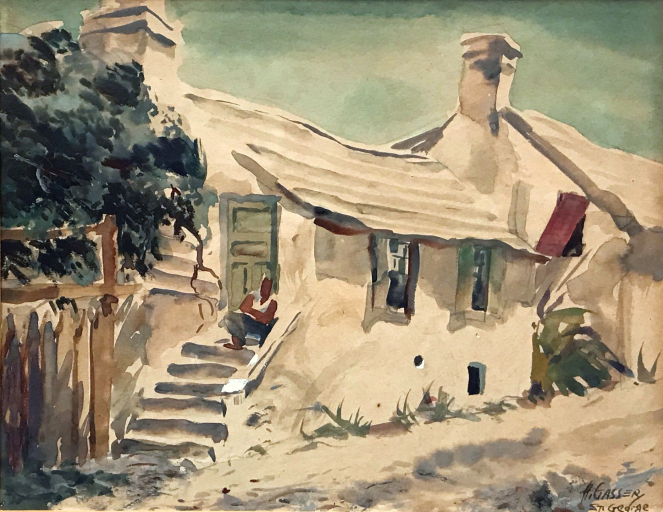
Bermuda Scene
