= Emilie Jenny Weyl =

French sculptor

- Born: 1855; Lure, France
- Died: 1934 (aged 78–79); Paris, France
- Known for: Sculpture

Emilie Jenny Weyl (1855—1934) was a French sculptor. She exhibited at the 1893 World's Columbian Exposition in Chicago, the 1889 Exposition Universelle and the 1900 Exposition Universelle, both in Paris.

== Biography ==
Weyl was born in 1855 in Lure, Haute-Saône. She received her training from the French sculptor Hélène Bertaux.

Weyl exhibited her work at the Palace of Fine Arts at the 1893 World's Columbian Exposition in Chicago, Illinois. She also exhibited at the Exposition Universelle 1889 (where she received an honorable mention), and at the Exposition Universelle 1900. She was a member of the Paris Salon.

Weyl died in 1934 in Paris.

Fifteen, exhibited in Fine Arts Palace at the 1893 World's Columbian Exposition
