= Marie H. Guise Newcomb =

American painter

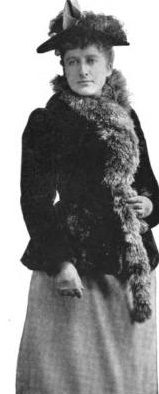
- Born: Marie H. Guise; 1865; Newark, New Jersey
- Died: June 23, 1895 (aged 29–30); New York, New York
- Known for: Painting
- Spouse: Edward W. Newcomb (m. 1890)

Marie H. Guise Newcomb (1865–1895) was an American painter. She is known for her paintings of animals.

== Biography ==
Marie H. Guise Newcomb was an American naturalist artist. She was born in Newark, New Jersey on an unknown date in 1865. As a child, Newcomb spent the majority of her time on farms and out in nature studying and admiring its beauty. She was fond of horses and studied their very nature of existence. In her youth, she illustrated sketches of horses and cattle and grew into a passion for her future.

In 1885, Newcomb traveled to Europe where she spent a year studying art in Paris under the direction of August Friedrich Albrecht Schenck, Luigi Chialva, and Édouard Detaille. August Friedrich Albrecht Schenck was an artist best known for his pieces portraying animals and landscapes. Luigi Chialva was an Italian artist who gained his reputation by producing artwork of animals. Édouard Detaille was a French painter who was respected as a master artist for his accurate portrayals of battles and military life.

After her time spent studying in Paris, she traveled to Algeria and the Sahara. In Algeria and the Sahara, she devoted her time to studying the Arab and the horses in this environment. Newcomb spent a year studying in Algeria before moving on to a desert environment. Here is where Newcomb mastered her illustrations of horses. Her portrayal of horses is one that not many other artists can compare to, as her interest in sketching them as a child only grew into a mastery of scientifically documenting the anatomy of these beautiful creatures. Her. Understanding of the anatomy of horses is a developed knowledge that she has been indulged in since her adolescence.

Marie Guise married Edward W. Newcomb on May 14, 1890, in Manhattan, New York. Edward Newcomb was a photographer and produced a monthly magazine titled The Photo-American, which was an illustrated monthly magazine devoted to amateur photography. The Photo-American contained illustrations by Marie H. Guise Newcomb throughout the entire magazine. Marie H. Guise Newcomb’s illustrations in The Photo-American were primarily of children. These images were family oriented following a day in the life through a child’s perspective.

Much of Newcomb’s art was produced within the confines of the sheds and stables proximal to her studio, which was located in New York City. Newcomb had standards for the way she documented animals. She wanted to observe them, understand them, illustrate them, document them, and admire them in their own environment and on their own terms. Newcomb was an avid animal lover and that is portrayed through the professionalism and detail in her artwork. She was a member of the Society for the Prevention of Cruelty to Animals, as her passion for animals and their well-being was of utmost importance to her. A quote from Newcomb is included on the website askART speaking on her interpretation of animals: I am with animals all the time, and have grown to understand many of their little ways and wants. For years I have been a member of the Society for the Prevention of Cruelty to Animals, and all horses are my friends, but I think that my heart goes out more to the old cart horses that have often, I know, seen better days, and so far as it is in my power to prevent, they shall never want for water.

The Society for the Prevention of Cruelty to Animals, also known as the SPCA, is an organization that works to help animals suffering from inhumane treatment and inadequate conditions. These conditions include hoarding situations, animal fighting rings, puppy mills, and unsanitary breeding houses. In 1893, The Times-Picayune, a newspaper source in New Orleans, Louisiana released an article about a painting by Newcomb. This painting includes two horses drinking from a water fountain in front of the Society for the Prevention of Cruelty to Animals headquarters. Before the publishment of this painting, Newcomb stated her intention to utilize all the money made by this painting to pay for a large, clean drinking basin for horses and a small drinking basin for smaller animals like dogs. On the opposing side, there would be a clean drinking fountain for people. These basins were to be placed proximally to the headquarters of the Society for the Prevention of Cruelty to Animals.

Newcomb had her illustrations in the art exhibits at the Palace of Fine Arts, the Art Institute of Chicago, the Pennsylvania Academy, the National Academy, the Paris Salon, and the 1893 World’s Columbian Exposition in Chicago. She received an honorable mention at the Paris Salon for her illustrations. Some of the works that she exhibited at the Palace of Fine Arts and The Woman's Building at the 1893 World’s Columbian Exposition in Chicago include Bloodhound Head Study, Three Beagle Pups Napping, Played Out, A Goodly Company, Browsing Sheep, and Sheep in the Clearing. The Paris Salon was the official art exhibition of the Académie des Beaux-Arts in Paris and was considered to be the most respected art event held in the western world. The Art Institute of Chicago is one of the largest and oldest art institutes around the globe and contains thousands of pieces of art from around the world and including pieces from well-known- and lesser-known artists.

Newcomb died in New York City, New York on Saturday, June 23, 1894. Newcomb died at the age of thirty, with a diagnosis of heart failure. She is buried in Valhalla, New York, just northeast of New York City.

== Gallery ==
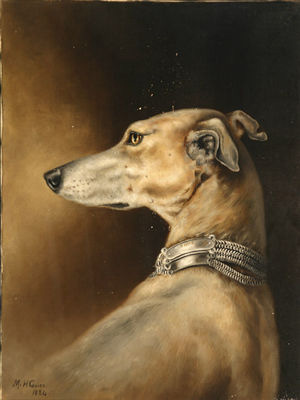
Greyhound in Profile (xmas), nd

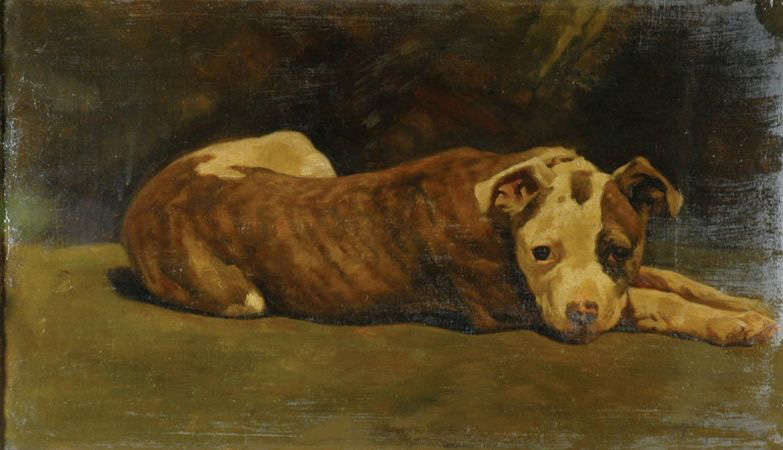
An Observant Friend at Rest, nd

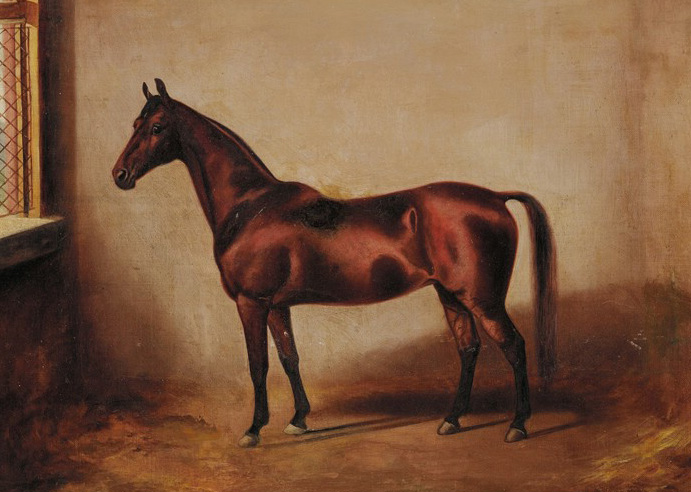
Portrait of a Horse, 1885

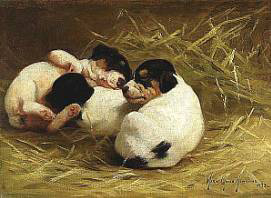
Three Beagle Pups Napping, 1893
