= Adeline Albright Wigand =

American painter

- Born: Adeline Albright; June 24, 1852; Madison, New Jersey
- Died: March 31, 1944 (aged 91)
- Known for: Painting
- Spouse: Otto Charles Wigand (m. 1890)

Adeline Albright Wigand (1852-1944) was an American painter. She was one of the first presidents of the National Association of Women Artists. She is known for her portrait paintings.

== Biography ==
Wigand née Albright was born on June 24, 1852, in Madison, New Jersey. She was raised in Cedar Rapids, Iowa. She studied at the Art Students League and Cooper Union Art School in New York. Her teachers in New York included William Merritt Chase.

Wigand traveled to Paris in the mid-1880s where she studied at the Académie Julian. Her instructors included Tony Robert-Fleury and William-Adolphe Bouguereau.

Albright married fellow artist Otto Charles Wigand in 1890.

Wigand exhibited her work at the Palace of Fine Arts at the 1893 World's Columbian Exposition in Chicago, Illinois. Wigand exhibited, and won prizes, at the National Academy of Design, the National Arts Club, and the National Association of Women Artists. Additionally she exhibited at the Art Institute of Chicago, the Corcoran Gallery of Art, and the Paris Salon.

Wigand's listing in Woman's Who's Who of America: A Biographical Dictionary of Contemporary Women of the United States and Canada, 1914-1915 noted that she "Favors woman suffrage". Wigand was a member of the National Association of Women Artists, serving as one of its first presidents. She also served as the head of the Art Committee of the Staten Island Institute of Arts and Sciences from 1925 to 1931.

Wigand died on March 31, 1944.

== Legacy ==
In 2010-2011 the Wigands were the subject of a retrospective, Beauty Rediscovered: Paintings by Adeline Albright Wigand & Otto Charles Wigand, at the Staten Island Museum, New York.

== Gallery ==
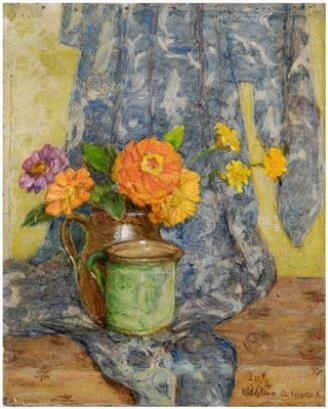
Still Life with Zinnias in a Pitcher with Green Cup and Blue Drape by Adeline Albright Wigand, nd

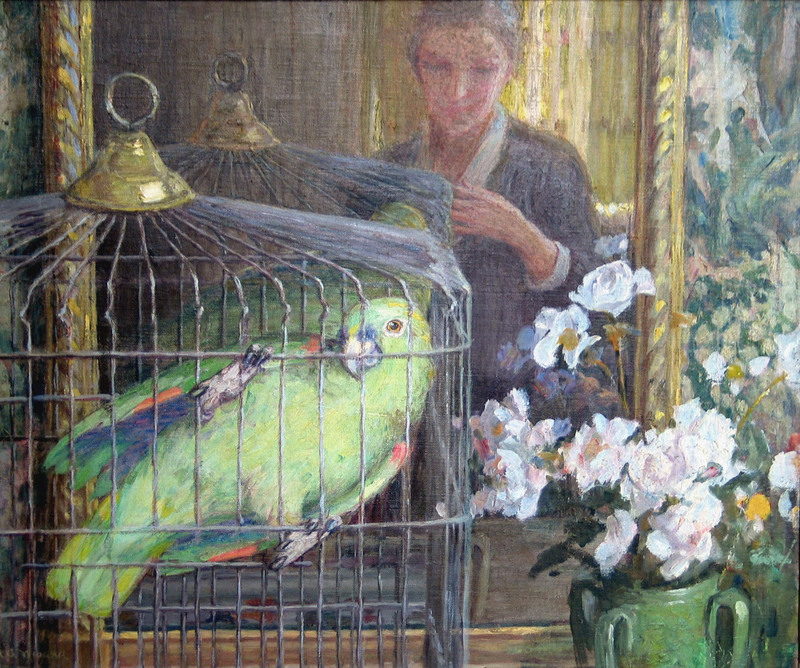
Polly, by Adeline Albright Wigand c. 1915 – 1920
