= Hedwig Friedländer =

Austrian painter (1863–1945)

- Born: 13 February 1863; Vienna
- Died: 9 December 1945 (aged 82); Vienna
- Known for: Painting

Hedwig Edle von Malheim Friedländer, after 1919 Hedwig Friedländer (1863–1945) was an Austrian painter.

== Biography ==
Friedländer was born in 1863. She studied in Munich with Carl Frithjof Smith. She also studied at the School of Applied Arts in Vienna.

Friedländer exhibited her work in the rotunda of The Woman's Building at the 1893 World's Columbian Exposition in Chicago.

She died in 1945.

== Gallery ==
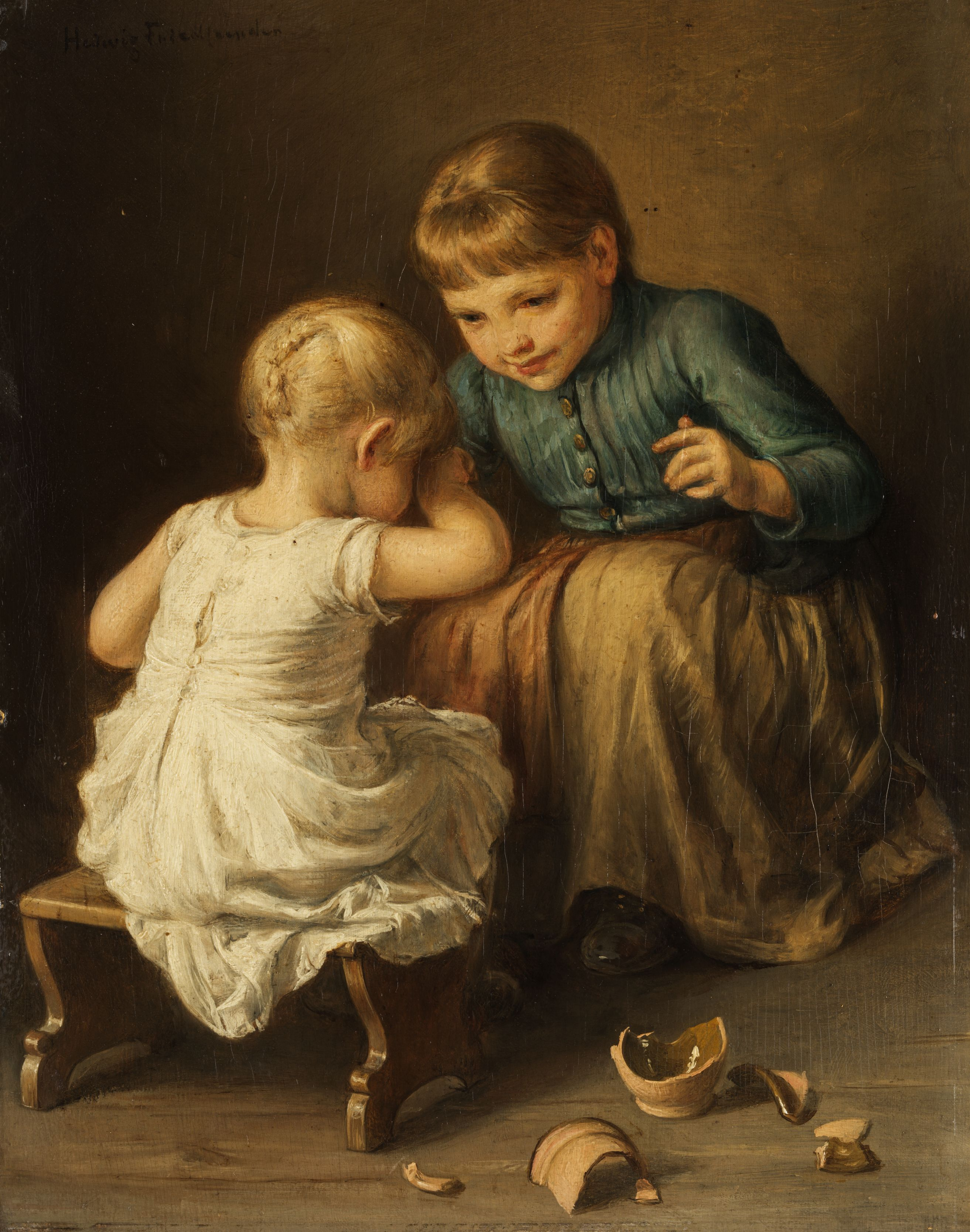
Trost im Unglück (Comfort in Misfortune)

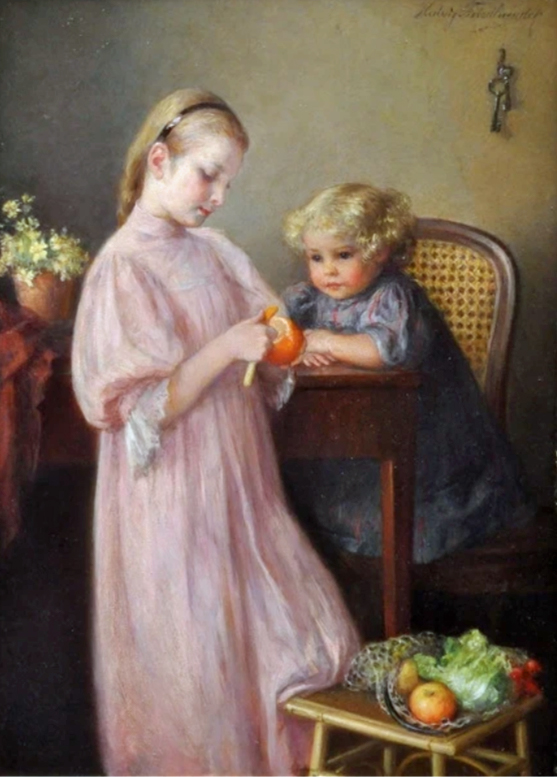
Es gibt Obst (There is Fruit)

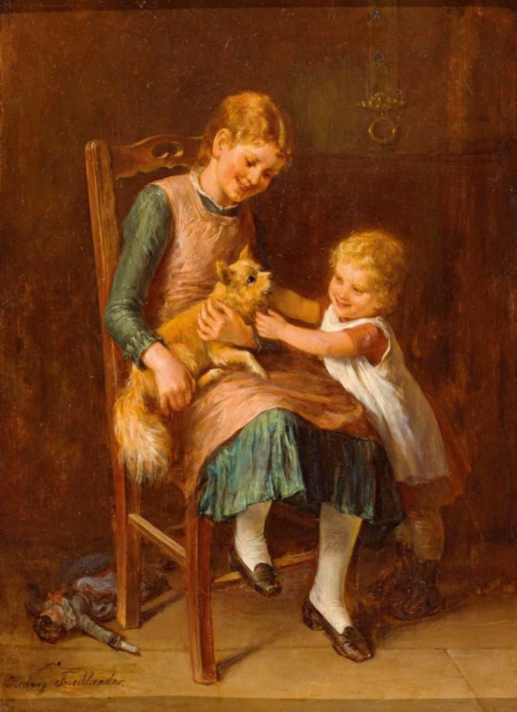
Geschwisterpaar spielt mit dem Hündchen (Siblings Play with the Puppy)
