= Augusta Roszmann =

Belgian artist

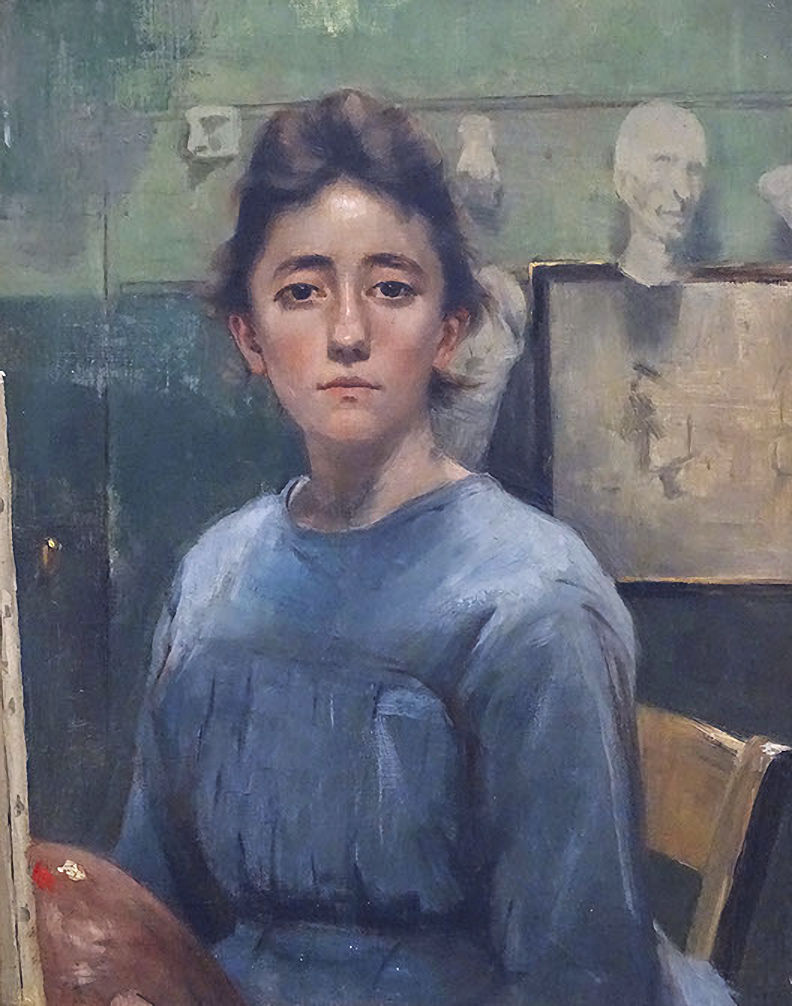
- Born: 1 September 1859; Ghent, Belgium
- Died: 1945 (aged 85–86); Ghent, Belgium
- Other names: Augusta Charlotte Cornelie Roszmann
- Known for: Painting

Augusta Charlotte Cornelie Roszmann (1859–1945) was a Belgian artist.

== Biography ==
Roszmann (Rossmann) was born on 1 September 1859 in Ghent. She studied in Paris at the Académie Julian. Her teachers included William-Adolphe Bouguereau, Gustave Boulanger, Jules Joseph Lefebvre, and Tony Robert-Fleury. Rossmann exhibited her work at the Palace of Fine Arts at the 1893 World's Columbian Exposition in Chicago, Illinois. She died in 1945 in Ghent. Her work is in the collection of the Kunstmuseum Basel.

== Gallery ==
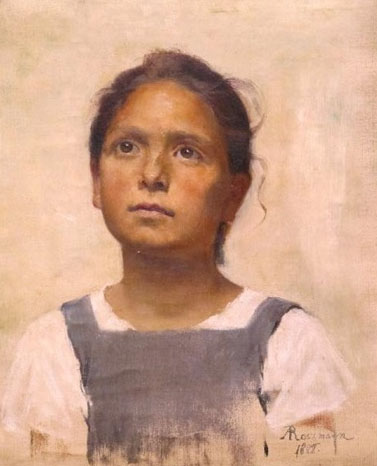
Portrait d'une jeune fille, 1888

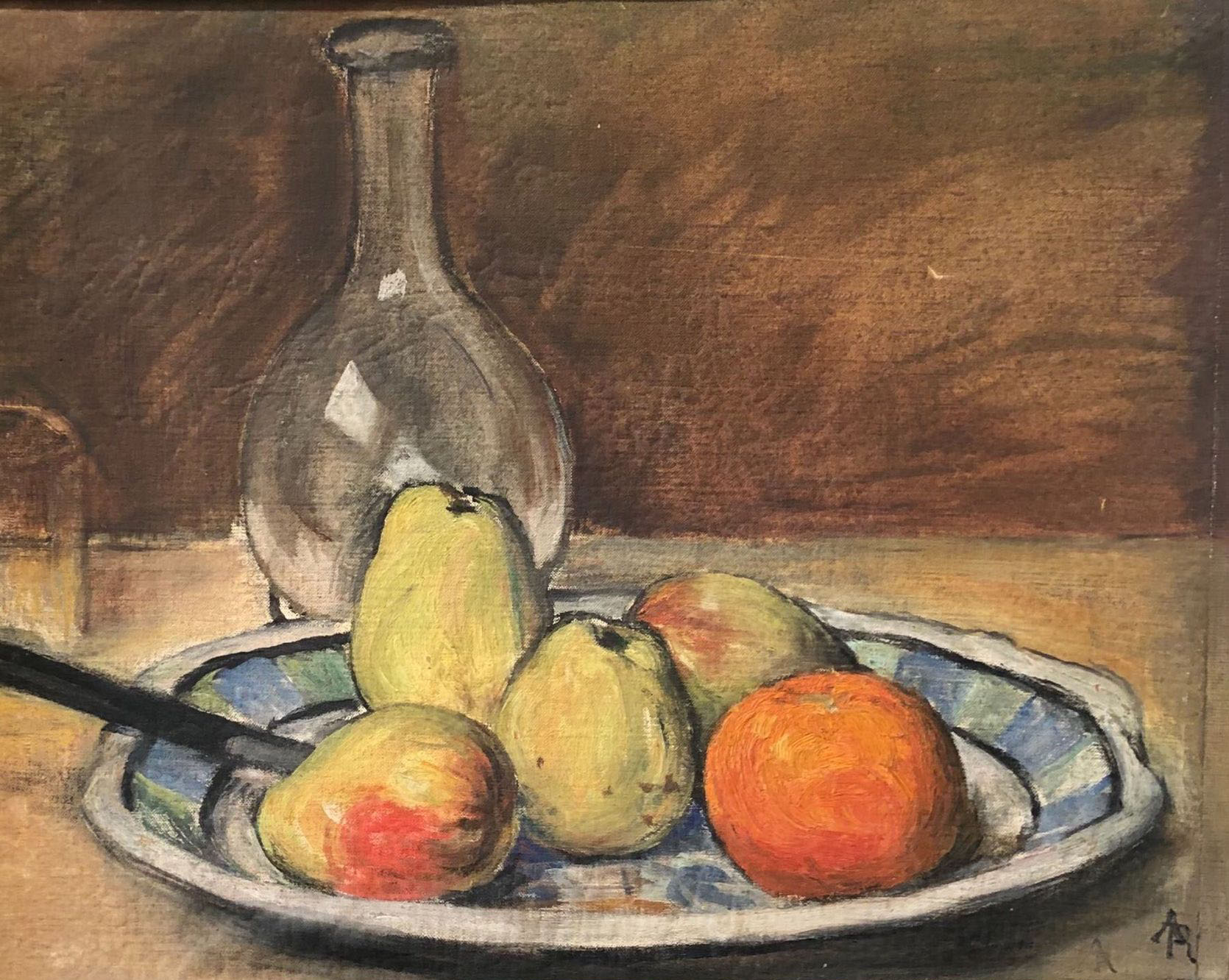
Stillleben mit Früchten c. 1910
