= Camille van Mulders =

Belgian painter

- Born: Camille Triest; 1868; Brussels, Belgium
- Died: 1949 (aged 80–81)
- Known for: Painting

Camille van Mulders (1868 – 1949) was a Belgian still life painter.

== Life ==
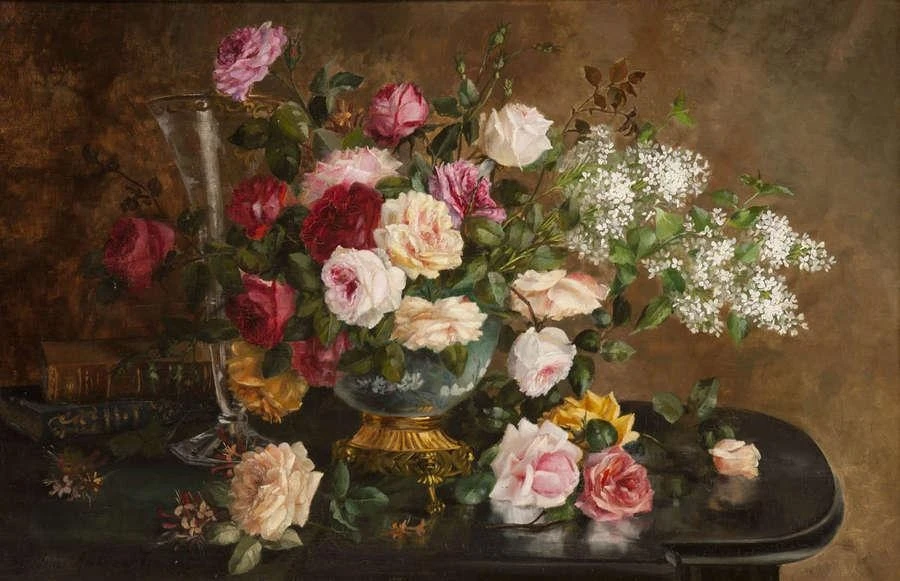
Still life with flowers on a table by Camille Triest van Mulders

Mulders was born in Brussels in 1868. She studied with the Belgian painters Hubert Bellis and Jean-François Portaels. She focused on flower pieces, working in pastels and oil paints. Mulders exhibited her work in the Woman's Building and the Palace of Fine Arts at the 1893 World's Columbian Exposition in Chicago, Illinois.

She died in the year 1949.
