= Rebecca Newbold Van Trump =

American painter

- Born: 1839; Pennsylvania
- Died: 1935 (aged 95–96)
- Known for: Painting

Rebecca Newbold Van Trump (1839–1935) was an American painter known for her portraits and miniatures.

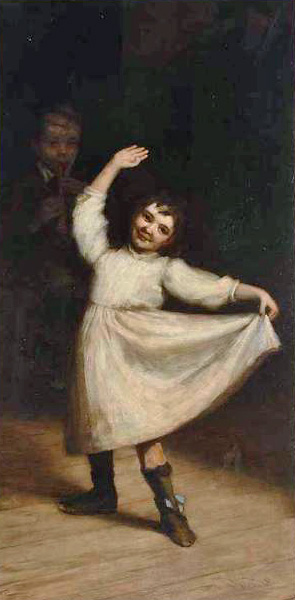
Child Dancing by Rebecca Newbold Van Trump

Van Trump was born in 1839 in Pennsylvania. She studied at the Pennsylvania Academy of the Fine Arts in Philadelphia and the Académie Julian in Paris, France. At the Académie Julian she was taught by Tony Robert-Fleury.

Van Trump exhibited her work at the Woman's Building at the 1893 World's Columbian Exposition in Chicago, Illinois. She also exhibited at the Paris Salon, the Art Institute of Chicago, and the Pennsylvania Academy of the Fine Arts.

Van Trump died in 1935.
