= Ellen Gertrude Cohen =

British painter and illustrator

- Born: 25 August 1860; Marylebone, London
- Died: 4 May 1946 (aged 85); Rome, Italy
- Known for: Painting, Illustration

Ellen Gertrude Cohen (25 August 1860 – 4 May 1946) was a British painter and illustrator.

== Biography ==
Cohen was born in 1860 in Marylebone to Barnet Soloman Cohen, a merchant, and Eliza Myers Cohen. She attended the Slade School of Art and the Royal Academy of London. She also studied in Paris under Jean-Joseph Benjamin-Constant and Jean-Paul Laurens.

She exhibited her work at the Royal Academy, Royal Institute of Painters in Water and Oil Colors, and the Paris Salon.

Cohen exhibited her work at the Palace of Fine Arts at the 1893 World's Columbian Exposition in Chicago, Illinois.

Cohn created illustrations for a variety of British publications including The Strand Magazine.

Cohen died in Rome in 1946, where she was living at a Franciscan convent.

== Images from the Illustrated London News ==
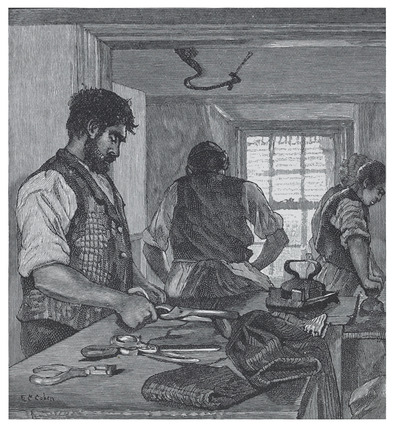
Jewish tailor's workshop 1891

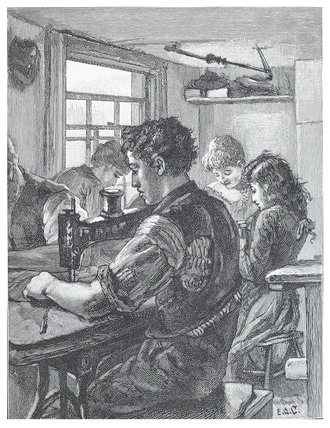
Jewish tailor's workshop 1891

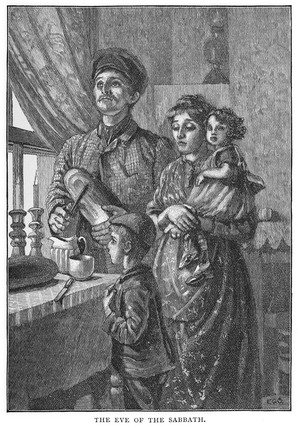
The Eve of the Sabbath 1891

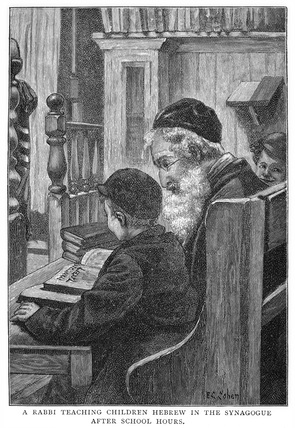
Rabbi teaching Hebrew 1891

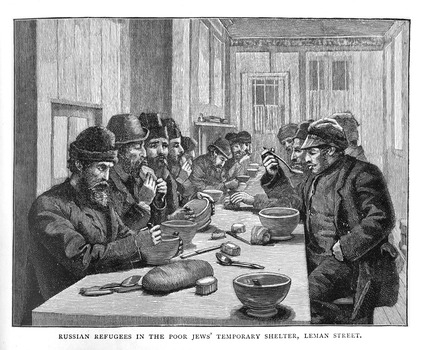
Russian refugees in the Poor Jews Temporary Shelter, Leman Street 1891
