= Fanny Tewksbury =

American painter

- Born: 1852; Boston, Massachusetts
- Died: 1934 (aged 81–82)
- Known for: Painting

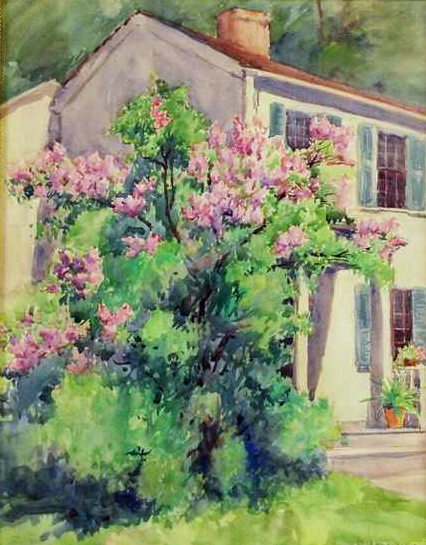
A Summer Day by Fanny Tewksbury

Fanny Wallace Tewksbury (1852-1934) was an American painter.

== Biography ==
Tewksbury was born in 1852 in Boston, Massachusetts.

Tewksbury exhibited her work at the Palace of Fine Arts at the 1893 World's Columbian Exposition in Chicago, Illinois. She was a member of the Brooklyn Art Association, the New York Watercolor Society, the National Association of Women Painters and Sculptors, and the Woman's Art Club of New York.

She died in 1934.
