= Berthe Burgkan =

French painter (1855–1936)

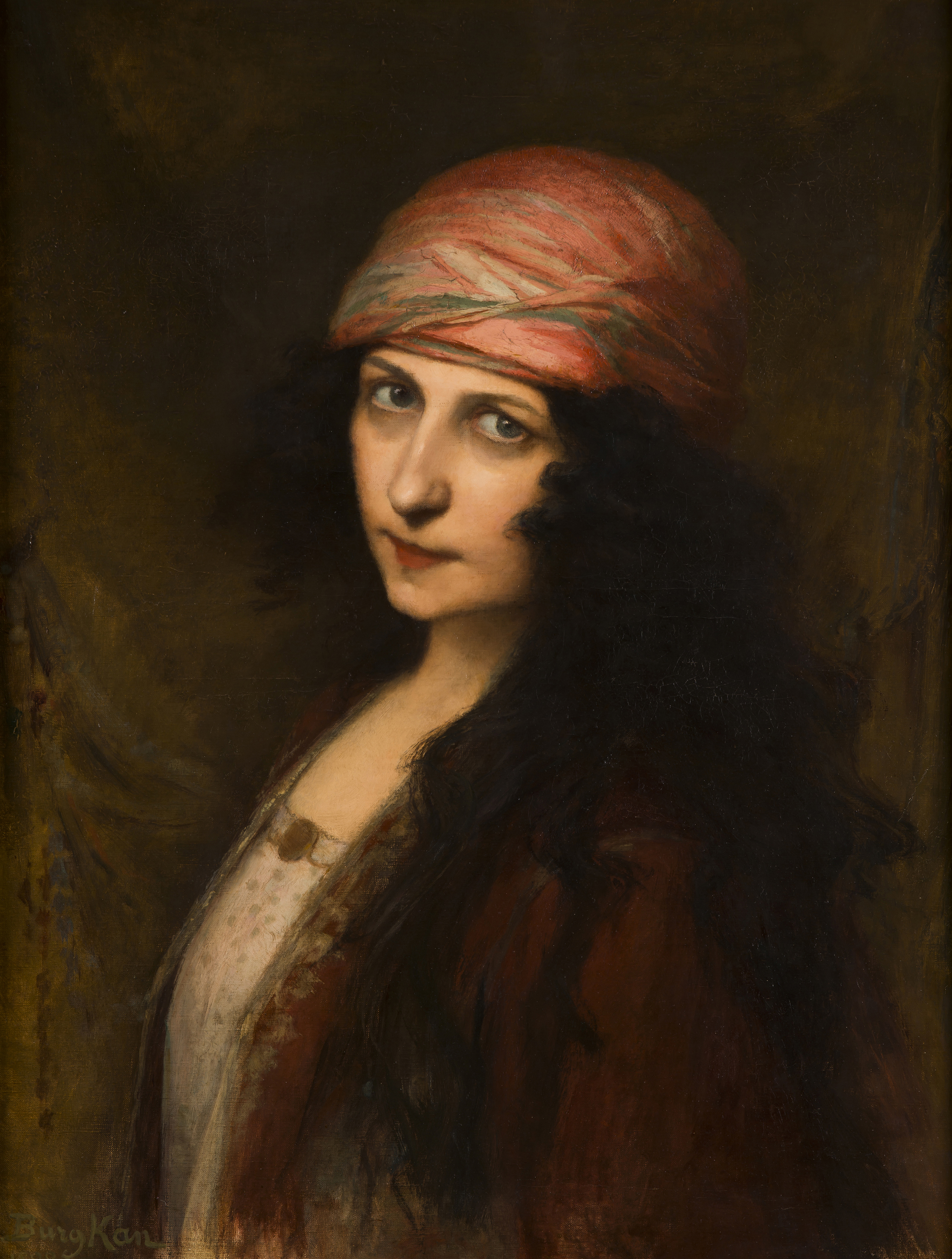
- Herodiade by Berthe Burgkan, (probably a self portrait) 1899
- Born: 1855; Paris, France
- Died: 1936 (aged 80–81)
- Known for: Painting

Berthe Burgkan (1855–1936) was a French painter. She was known for her genre and flower paintings.

== Biography ==
Burgkan was born in Paris in 1855. She attended the École des Beaux-Arts where she studied with Gustave Boulanger and at the Académie Julian where she studied with Jules Joseph Lefebvre and Tony Robert-Fleury.

She exhibited her paintings at the Paris Salon from 1878 through 1920. She also exhibited at the Arts de la Femme. In 1883 Burgkan became a member of the Société des Artistes Français. She exhibited her work at the Palace of Fine Arts at the 1893 World's Columbian Exposition in Chicago, Illinois.

She died in 1936.
