= Camille Cornelie Isbert =

French painter

- Born: Camille Cornelie Paillard; 1825
- Died: 1911 (aged 85–86)
- Known for: Painting

Camille Cornelie Isbert (1825–1911) was a French painter of miniatures.

== Biography ==
She was born to Louis Paillard and Marie-Joséphine Jeannon in 1825.

She exhibited her work at the Woman's Building at the 1893 World's Columbian Exposition in Chicago, Illinois.

She died in 1911.

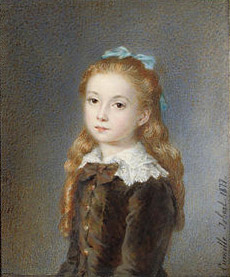
A young girl called Marie Dominique Amélie Madeleine Maza, 1877, by Camille Cornelie Isbert
