= Auguste Ludwig =

German painter (1834–1901)

- Born: 26 February 1834; Gräfenthal, Germany
- Died: 1901 (aged 66–67)
- Known for: Painting

Auguste Ludwig (1834-1901) was a German genre painter.

== Biography ==
Ludwig was born on 26 February 1834 in Gräfenthal. Throughout her career she lived in Dresden, Weimar, Berlin, and Düsseldorf. She exhibited her work at the Woman's Building at the 1893 World's Columbian Exposition in Chicago, Illinois.

Ludwig died in 1901.

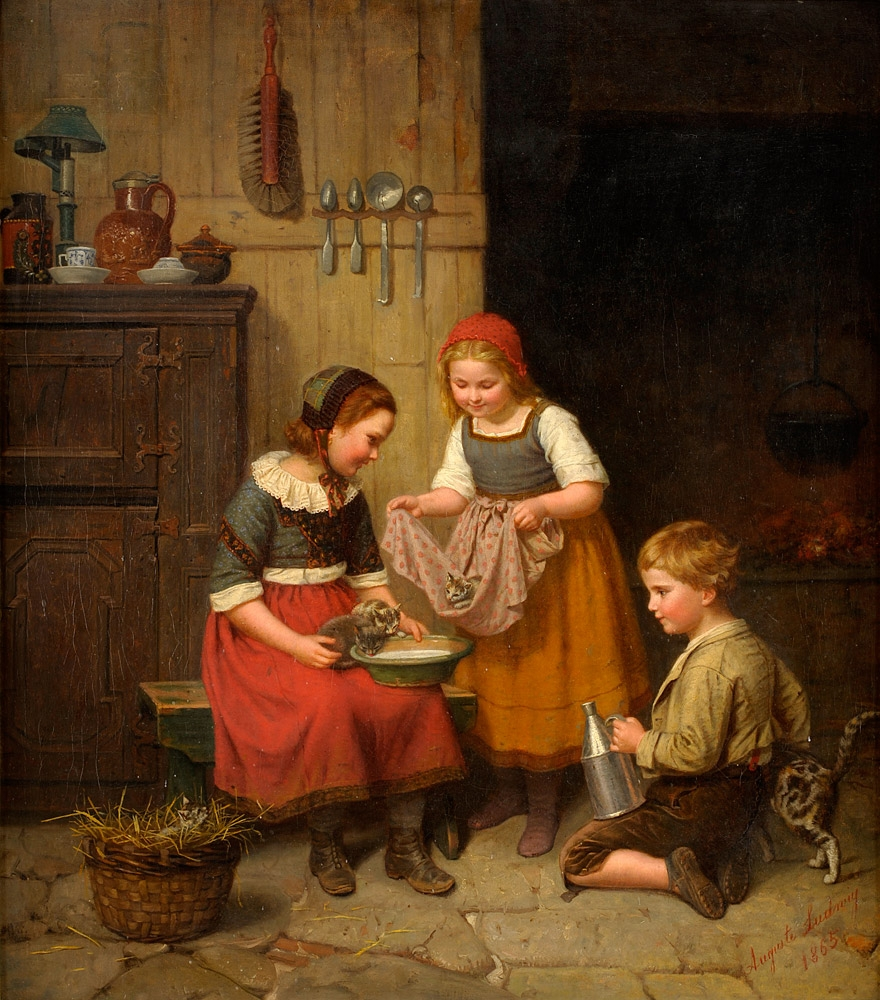
Kinder spielen mit Katzen in einer Küche, 1865
