= Jeanne Itasse-Broquet =

French sculptor (1867–1941)

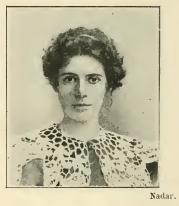
- Itasse-Broquet, photograph by Nadar
- Born: Jeanne Itasse; 25 September 1867; Paris, France
- Died: 12 January 1941 (aged 73); Paris, France
- Known for: Sculpture
- Spouse: Gaston Broquet

Jeanne Itasse-Broquet (1867–1941) was a French sculptor. She began her career at the age of fourteen, exhibiting at the Paris Salon.

== Biography ==
Itasse was born on 25 September 1867 in Paris. She received her training from her father, Adolphe Itasse. She married fellow sculptor Gaston Broquet.

Itasse-Broquet began exhibiting her work at the Paris Salon around 1881 and continued to do so until 1938. She exhibited her work at the Palace of Fine Arts and The Woman's Building at the 1893 World's Columbian Exposition in Chicago, Illinois. She also exhibited at the Exposition Universelle in 1900. She received medals at both exhibitions.

Itasse-Broquet died in 1941 in Paris.

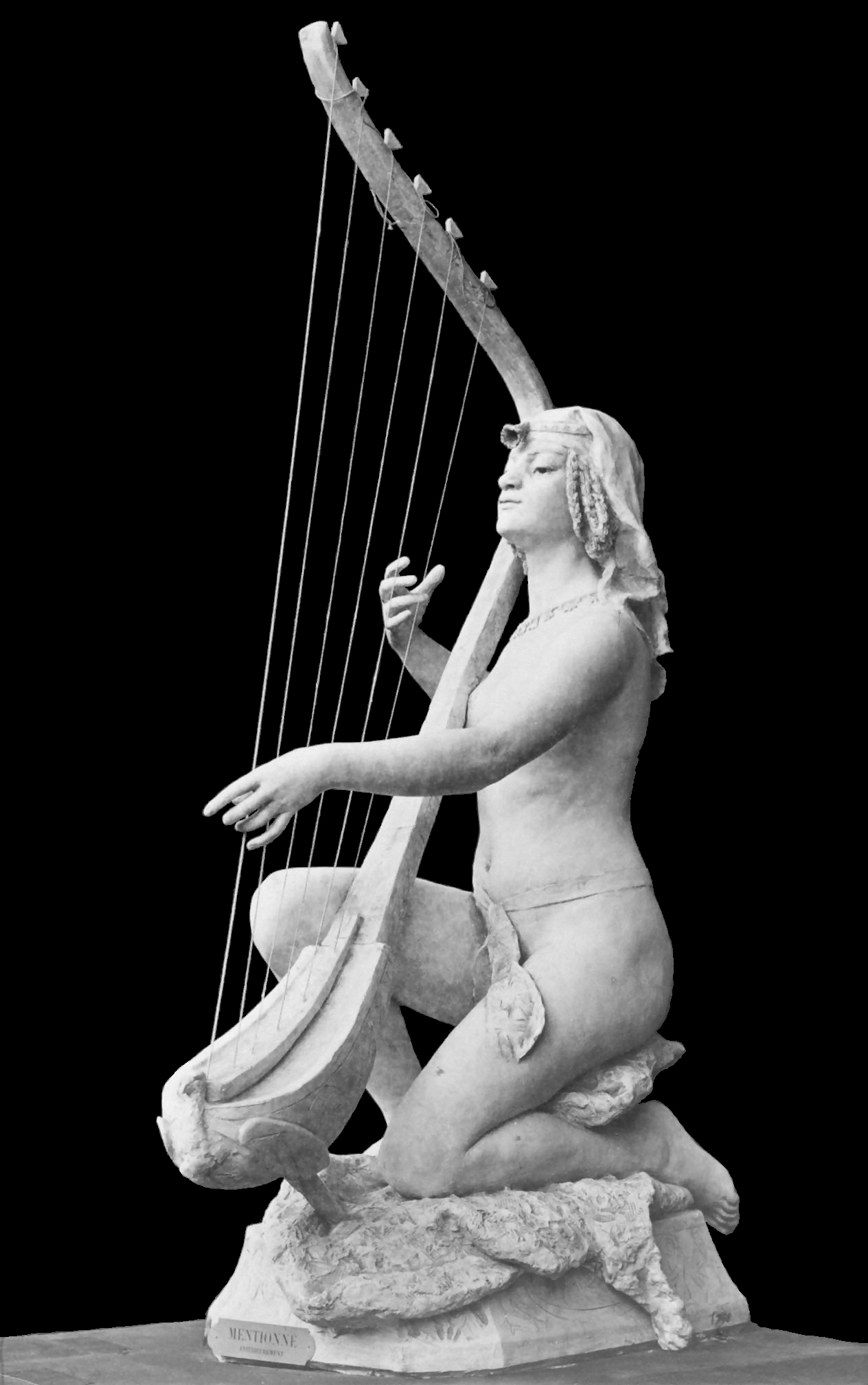
Egyptian Harpist by Jeanne Itasse-Broquet, 1891

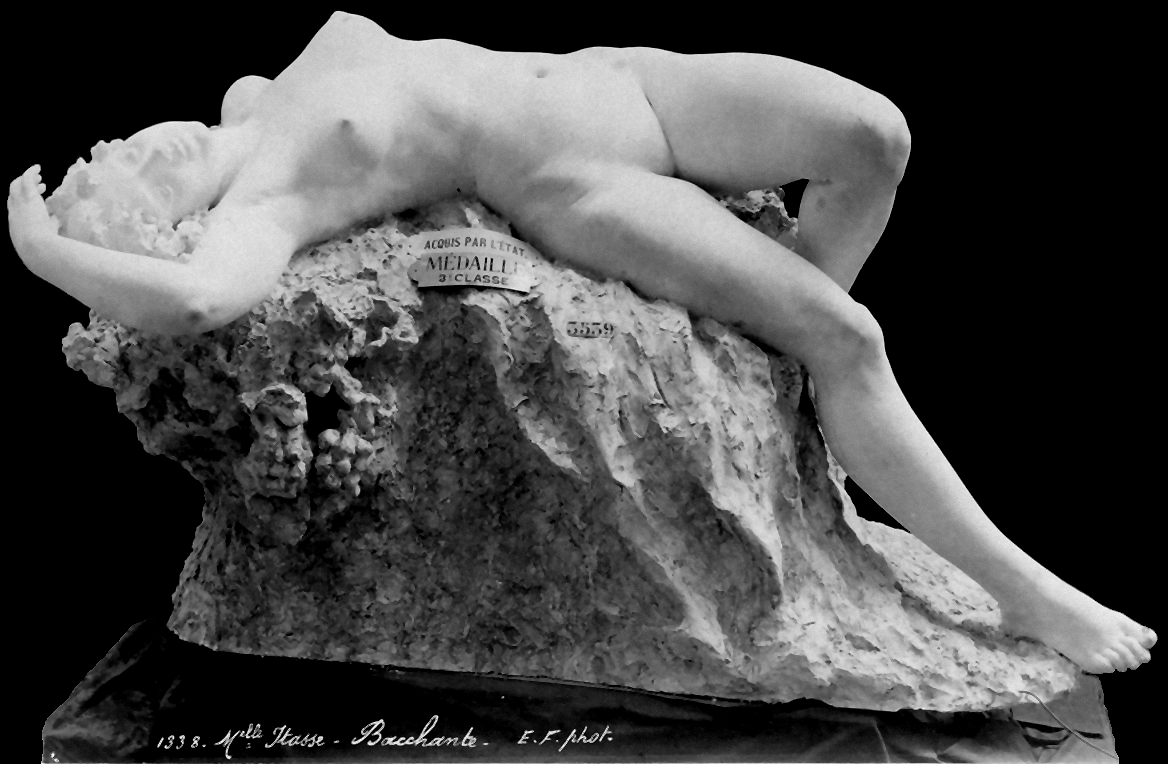
Bacchante by Jeanne Itasse-Broquet, 1899

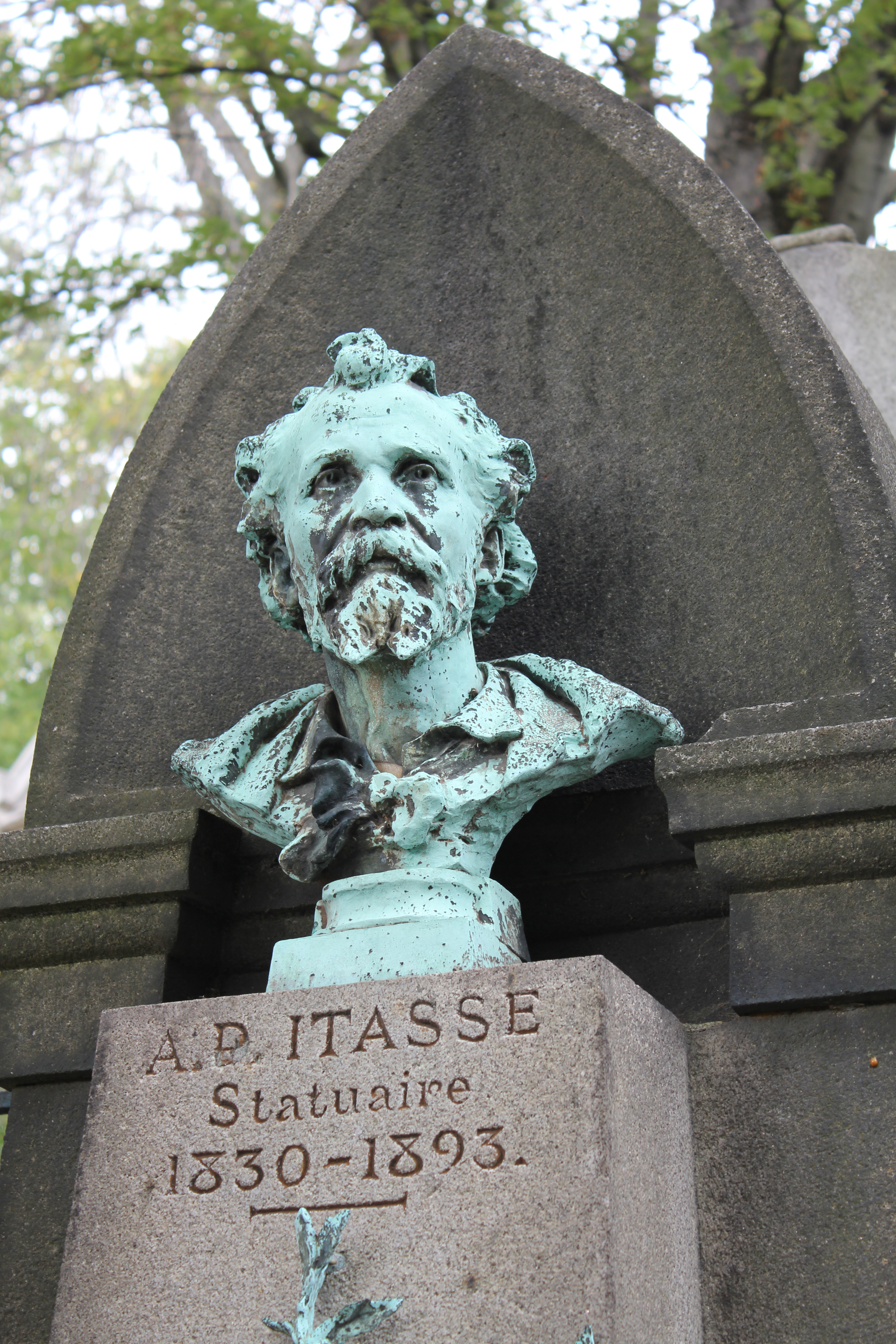
Bust of Adolphe Itasse at Père Lachaise Cemetery by Jeanne Itasse-Broquet
