= Hortense Richard =

French painter

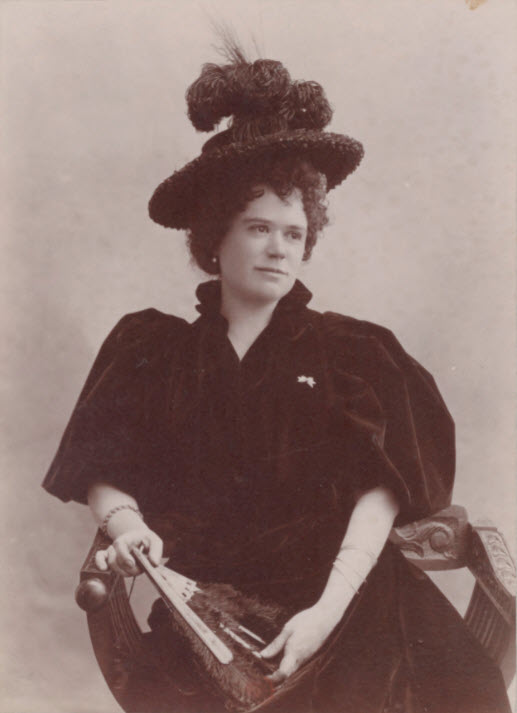
- Born: 24 June 1860; Paris, France
- Died: 1939 or 1940
- Known for: Painting
- Spouse: Désiré Alfred Magne (m. 1879)

Hortense Richard (1860–1939 or 1940) was a French painter.

== Biography ==
Richard was born on 24 June 1860 in Paris. She studied with Delphine Arnould de Cool-Fortin, Jules Joseph Lefebvre and William-Adolphe Bouguereau. She married fellow painter Désiré Alfred Magne in 1879.

She exhibited at the Paris Salon from 1875 to 1935. Richard exhibited her work at the Palace of Fine Arts and The Woman's Building at the 1893 World's Columbian Exposition in Chicago, Illinois.

She died in 1939 or 1940.

== Gallery ==
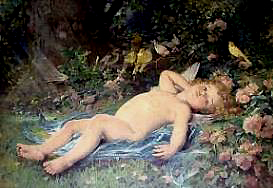
Love's Awakening (painting on porcelain)

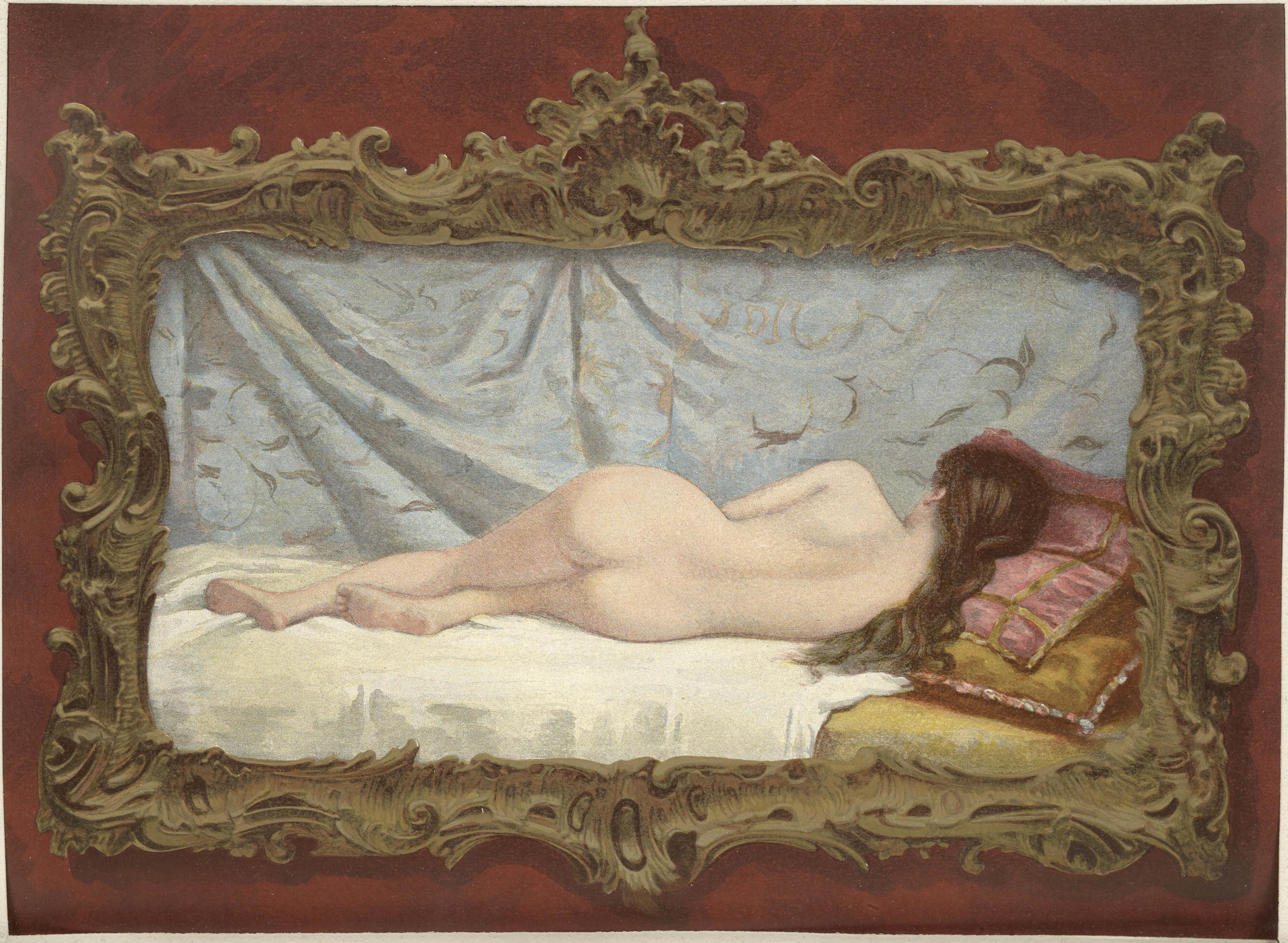
The sleeping woman (1893) (painting on ivory).

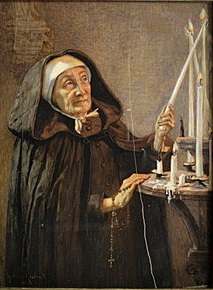
At the church in Poitou (1895), Musée du Louvre

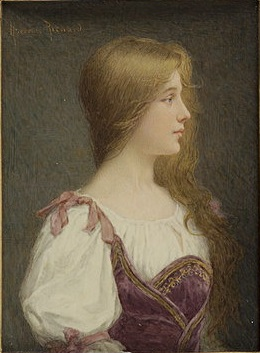
Side portrait of a young blond lady, Musée du Louvre

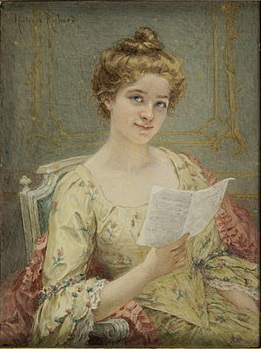
The letter of Manon, Musée du Louvre

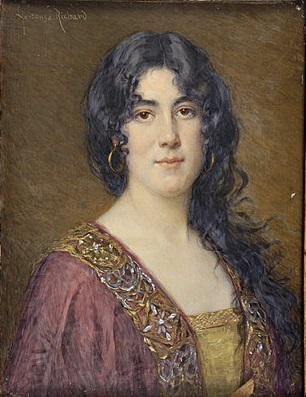
Portrait of a young brunette, Musée du Louvre
