= Adele Fay Williams =

American artist

- Born: Adele Fay; 1859; Joliet, Illinois
- Died: August 17, 1937 (aged 77–78); Joliet, Illinois
- Known for: Painting
- Spouse: John Williams (m. 1901; died 1916)

Adele Fay Williams (1859 – August 17, 1937) was an American artist best known for her prints and drawings of the buildings and streets of Joliet, Illinois.

== Family and education ==
Williams née Fay was born in 1859 in Joliet, Illinois. She was the daughter of William Fay, one of the earliest photographers in the state. She attended the Chicago Academy of Fine Arts, the Pennsylvania Academy of the Fine Arts, and the New York Art Students League. Starting in 1893, she spent several years studying in Paris at the Académie Colarossi and with the Impressionist painter Camille Pissarro.

In 1901, she married John Williams (d. 1916).

== Career ==
As an artist, Williams specialized in street scenes, and she made many prints and drawings of Joliet, some of which recorded the cityscapes of her day and some of which were based on historic photographs. She wrote about the history of Joliet for the Joliet Herald, illustrating these articles with her own artwork. Some of the buildings she depicted have since been demolished, making her oeuvre a valuable record of Joliet's changing urban landscape.

Williams also painted street scenes, harbor scenes, landscapes, and still lifes in an Impressionist style. She exhibited work in the Illinois building at the 1893 World's Columbian Exposition in Chicago.

Williams also published articles in the New York World, the New York Journal, The Washington Times, and other papers. She served for a time as an art critic for the Pittsburgh Spectator. During the period that she lived in Pittsburgh, she was a member of the Experimentalists, a group of avant-garde Pittsburgh women artists.

Williams's prints and drawings are held by the Howard and Lois Adelmann Regional History Collection at Lewis University.

== Death ==
On August 17, 1937, Williams died at a hospital in Joliet, Illinois.

== Gallery ==
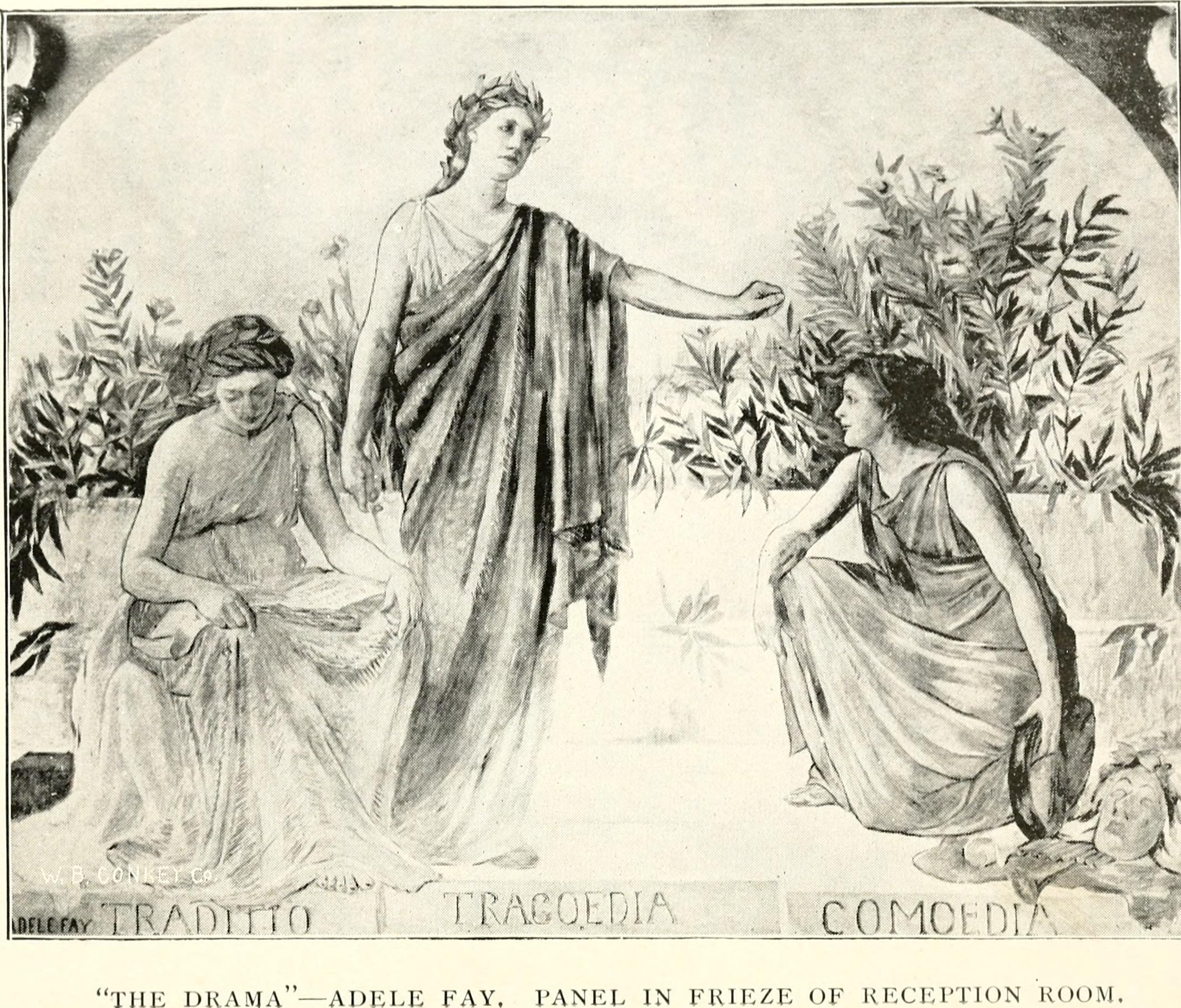
The Drama (1893)

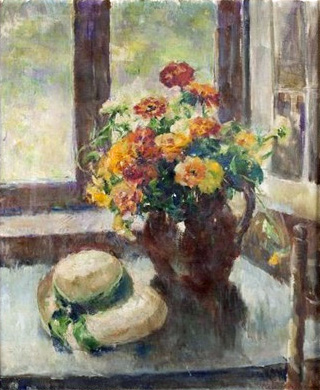
The Garden Hat

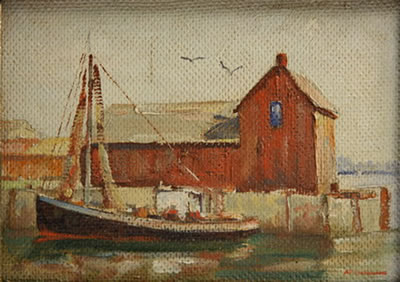
Cape Ann
