= Johanna Kirsch =

German painter

- Born: 1856; Chemnitz, Germany
- Died: 1907 (aged 50–51); Munich, Germany
- Known for: Painting

Johanna Kirsch (1856-1907) was a German painter known for her portrait and genre paintings.

== Biography ==
Kirsch was born in 1856 in Chemnitz, Germany. From 1883 to 1892 she studied at the Berlin Academy. Kirsch exhibited her work at the Woman's Building at the 1893 World's Columbian Exposition in Chicago, Illinois. Kirsch also exhibited her art at the Berlin Academy and the Munich Glass Palace.

Kirsch died in 1907 in Munich.

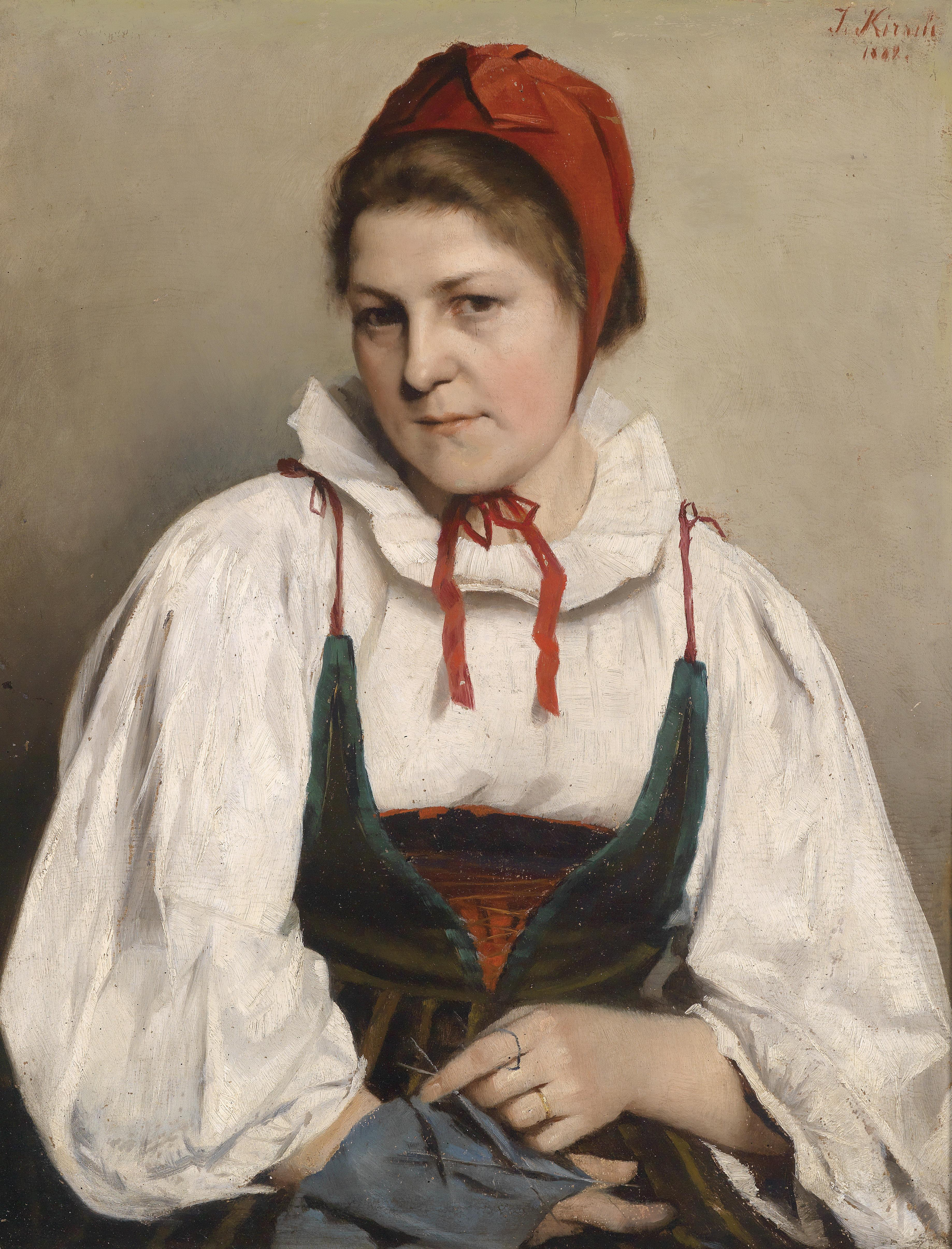
Strickende Frau by Johanna Kirsch, 1889
