= Charlotte Wahlström =

Swedish artist (1849–1924)

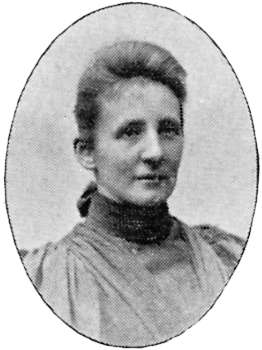
- Charlotte Wahlström, 1901
- Born: 17 November 1849; Svärta, Sweden
- Died: 22 February 1924 (aged 74); Stockholm, Sweden
- Known for: Painting

Charlotte Constance Wahlström (17 November 1849 – 22 February 1924) was a Swedish painter.

== Biography ==
Wahlström was born in the parish of Svärta in Södermanland, Sweden. She was the daughter of Anders Wahlström and Carolina Setterberg. She attended the Royal Swedish Academy of Fine Arts in Stockholm.

She traveled on a scholarship to Paris, Brittany in 1885 and later to Germany, the Netherlands and Belgium. In 1889, she spent a period in the artist colony in Barbizon. Wahlström exhibited her work at the Palace of Fine Arts at the 1893 World's Columbian Exposition in Chicago, Illinois. She was awarded a bronze medal at the Louisiana Purchase Exposition at St. Louis, Missouri in 1904. Wahlström died in 1924 in Stockholm and was buried at Norra begravningsplatsen.

Her art is characterized by prominent landscapes often with motifs from Skåne.

Wahlström is represented at the Gothenburg Art Museum and the Nationalmuseum in Stockholm as well as at museums in Östergötland, Malmö, Östersund and Örebro.

== Gallery ==
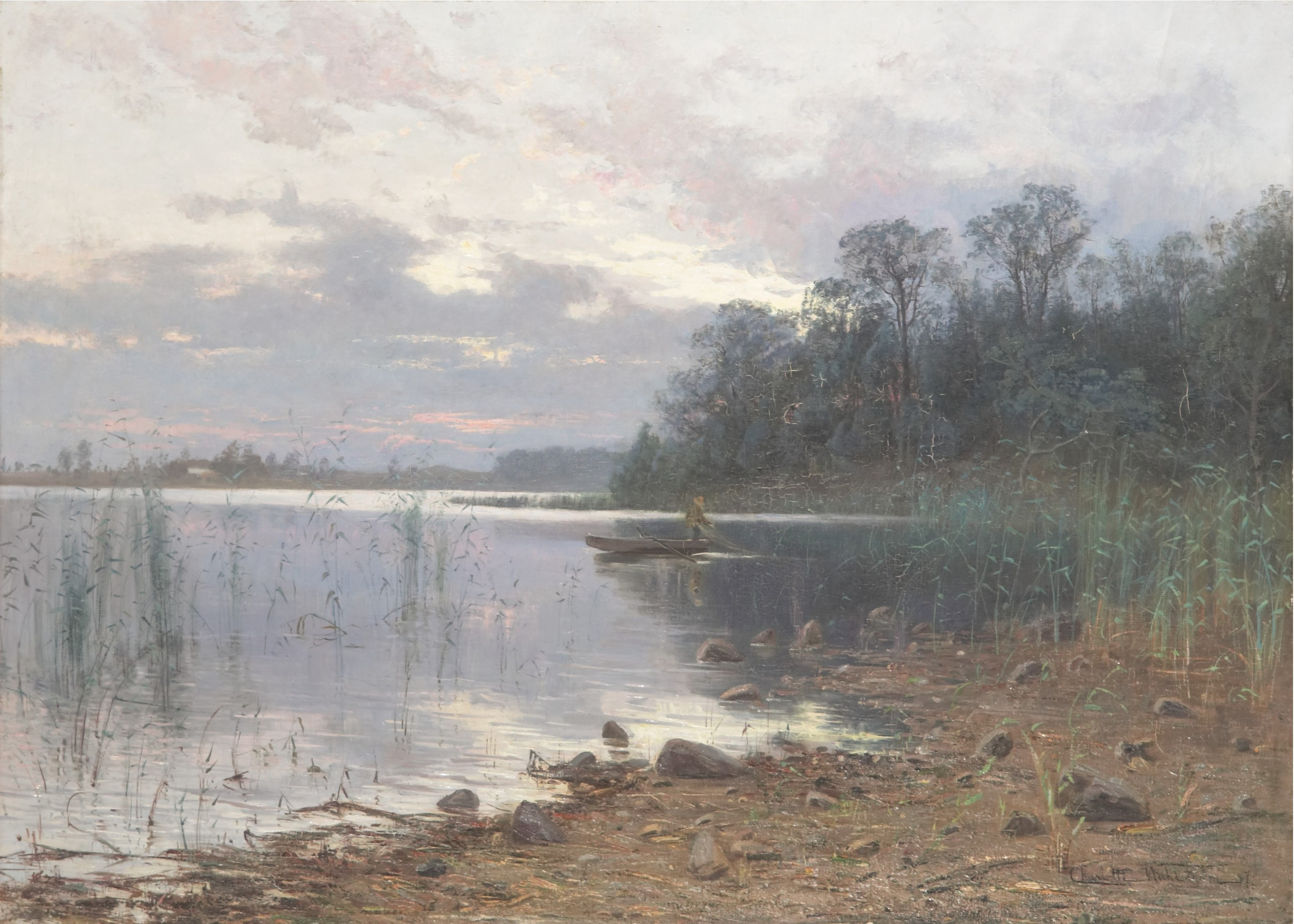
Lake landscape at dusk, 1887

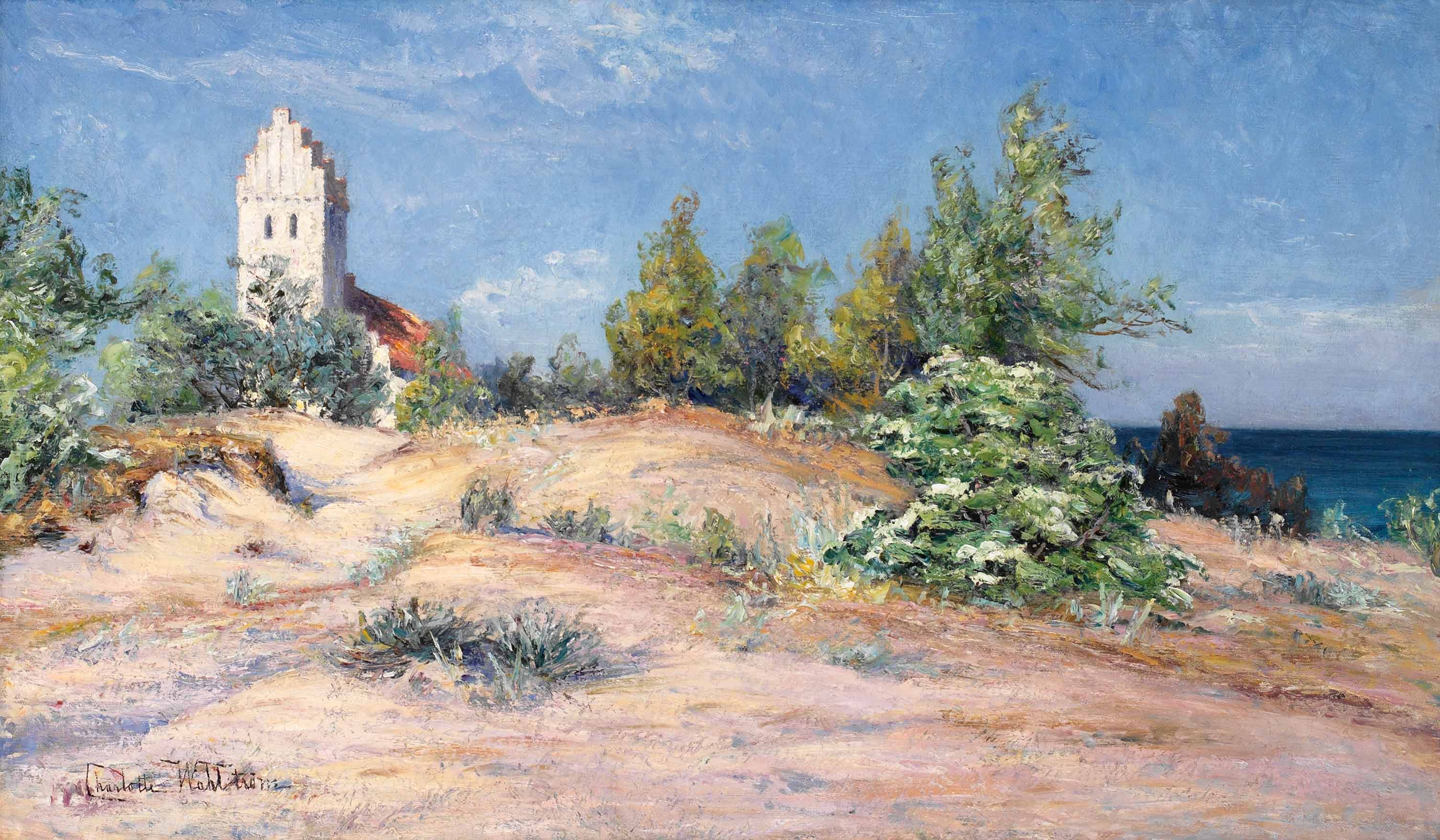
Summer morning, Falsterbo
