= Sarah Anne Freeman Clarke =

American painter (1808–1896)

- Born: 1808
- Died: 1896 (aged 87–88)
- Known for: Painting

Sarah Anne Freeman Clarke (1808-1896) was an American painter with a connection to the Boston Transcendentalist Movement.

== Biography ==
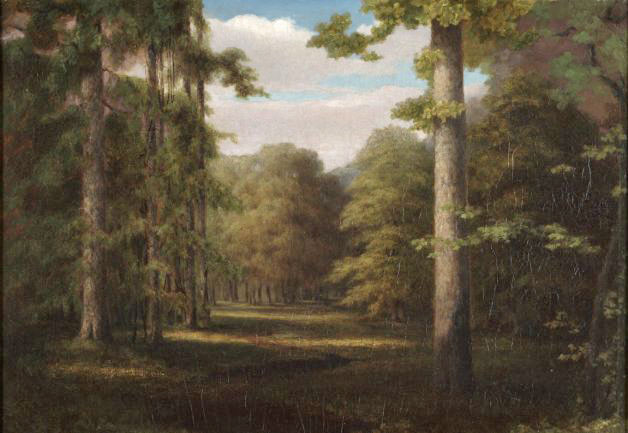
Kentucky Beech Forest c. 1839

Clarke was born in Massachusetts in 1808. Her brother was the Unitarian minister James Freeman Clarke. She was involved in the Transcendentalist Movement.

In 1843 Clarke traveled with her brother James and mutual friend Margaret Fuller to the area of the Great Lakes and the territories of Wisconsin and Illinois. Fuller wrote and Clarke illustrated the journey in the book Summer on the Lakes in 1843.

After moving to Marietta, Georgia, Clarke opened the Franklin Lending Library out of her home in 1882. In 1883 the Marietta Library Association was founded. The first library building in Cobb County, the Sarah Freeman Clarke Library, opened on Church Street in 1893.

Clarke exhibited her work at the Woman's Building at the 1893 World's Columbian Exposition in Chicago, Illinois.

She died in 1896.
