= Mary Lizzie Macomber =

American painter

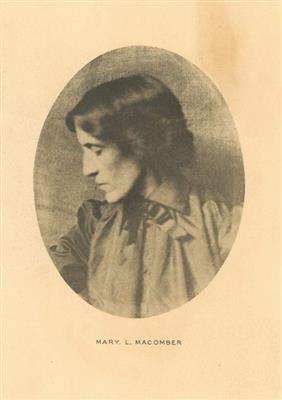
- Born: August 21, 1861; Fall River, Massachusetts
- Died: February 4, 1916 (aged 54); Boston, Massachusetts
- Known for: Painting
- Movement: Pre-Raphaelite

Mary Lizzie Macomber (August 21, 1861 – February 4, 1916) was an American artist who painted in the Pre-Raphaelite style.

== Life and work ==
Macomber was born in Fall River, Massachusetts, the daughter of Frederick William and Mary White Poor Macomber. Her father was a jeweler and her family was of Quaker and Pilgrim descent. As a young woman she took painting lessons with Robert S. Dunning, a prominent still life painter. After about three years with Dunning she began studying at the school of the Boston Museum of Fine Arts. In 1883 she had to discontinue her studies due to illness. After recovering she studied with Frank Duveneck.

Around 1885 Macomber started her own studio in Boston. After initially having painted still lifes she began to concentrate on allegorical works. Her first painting to be exhibited, Ruth, was shown at the National Academy exhibition of 1889. In total for the next 13 years she exhibited more than 25 works at the National Academy.

In 1893 two of her works Love Awakening Memory, and The Annunciation were exhibited in the Palace of Fine Arts at the World's Columbian Exposition. St. Catherine (1897) won the Dodge prize at the National Academy exhibition in New York. Some of her best-known works are: Love's Lament (1893), The Hour Glass (1900), The Lace Jabot (1900), Night and Her Daughter Sleep (1903), and Memory Comforting Sorrow (1905). She also worked as a poet and published a book of her poetry in 1914.

Much of her work was lost during a fire in her studio in 1903. She died at the Back Bay Hospital in Boston in 1916, at the age of 54. Her paintings are held in the Smithsonian and the Museum of Fine Arts, Boston.

== Selected work ==
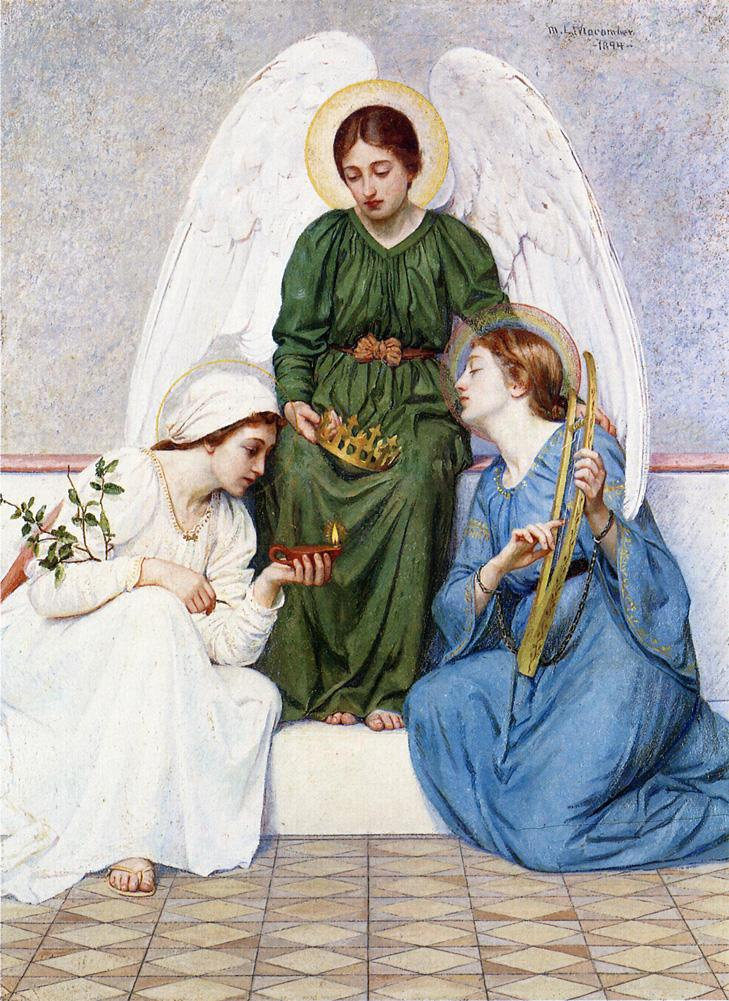
Faith, Hope, and Love (1894)

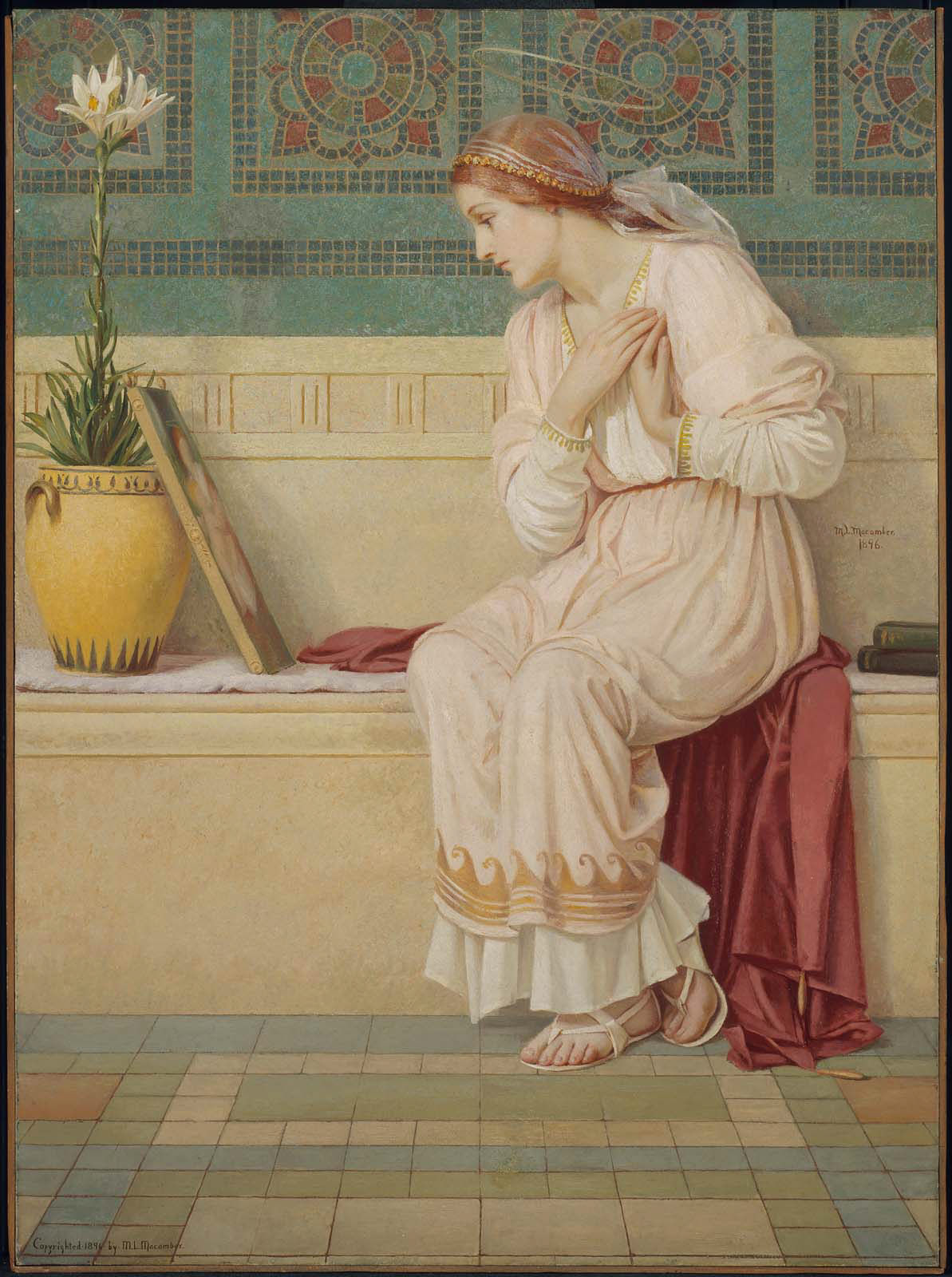
Saint Catherine (1896)

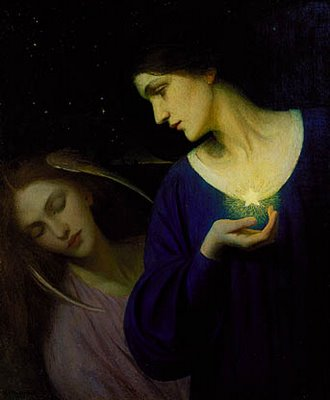
Night and Sleep (1902)

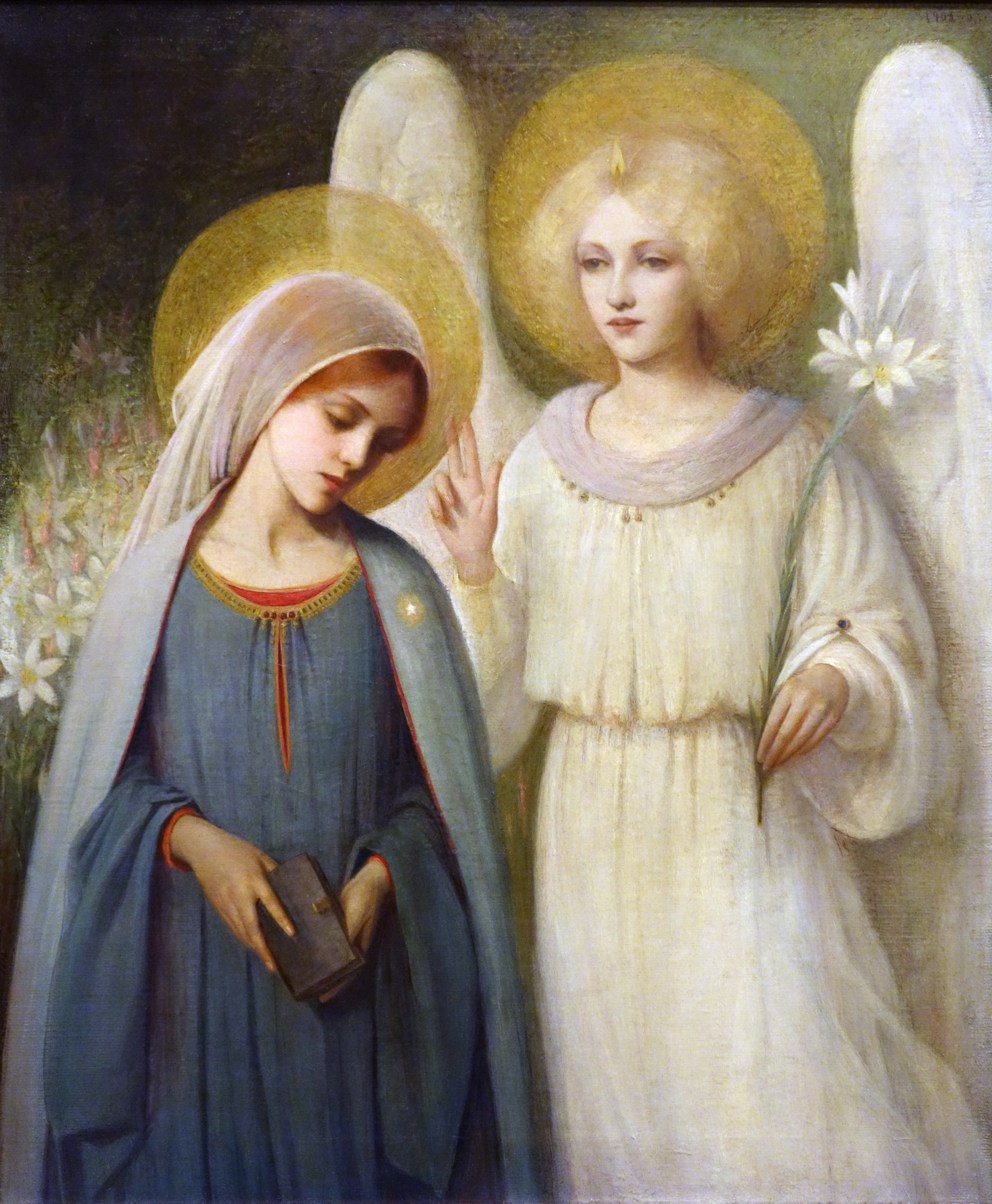
Stella Maris (1902–1903)

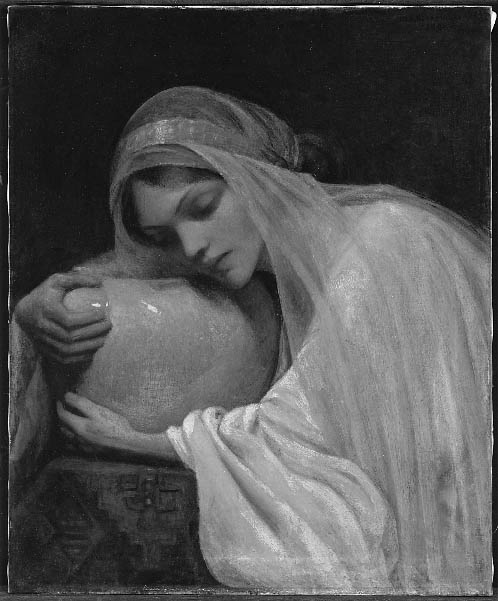
Isabella (1908)
