= Rosalie Lorraine Gill =

American painter (1867–1898)

- Portrait of Miss Rosalie Gill by William Merritt Chase 1886
- Born: 1867; Elmira, New York, US
- Died: 1898 (aged 30–31); Paris, France
- Education: Art Students League of New York
- Known for: Painting

Rosalie Lorraine Gill (1867–1898) was an American painter who studied and worked in Paris. A student of William Merritt Chase and Alfred Stevens, she exhibited at the Exposition Universelle in Paris and the World's Columbian Exposition in Chicago.

== Biography ==
Gill was born in 1867 in Elmira, New York. Little is known about her early life. In 1874, she and her father, a wealthy businessman named Owen A. Gill Jr., moved to New York City, where her father joined a tea importing company. At the age of 12, Rosalie began studying art at the Art Students League of New York and with William Merritt Chase. In the late 1880s she moved to Paris, where she studied with Alfred Stevens.

Gill exhibited at the National Academy of Design and the Society of American Artists in 1884, at the Paris Salon in 1888, and at the Exposition Universelle in Paris in 1889. In 1893, she exhibited her work at the Palace of Fine Arts and the Woman's Building at the World's Columbian Exposition in Chicago. In the 1880s and 1890s, she traveled frequently between Paris, New York, and Baltimore, exhibiting her work in all three cities. She married René Lara in 1897 and held the title Comtesse de Chaban.

Gill died in Paris on January 26, 1898, at the age of 31.

== Gallery ==
Gill's art includes the following paintings:

- The Orchid (1889), held at the Peabody Institute of Johns Hopkins University
- The New Model (c. 1884), held at the Baltimore Museum of Art
- Lady with a Fan (1884), held at the Baltimore Museum of Art

The New Model depicted William Merritt Chase's studio in New York.

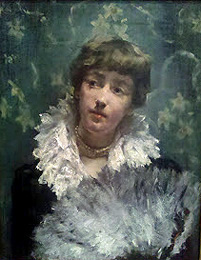
Lady with a Fan (1884)

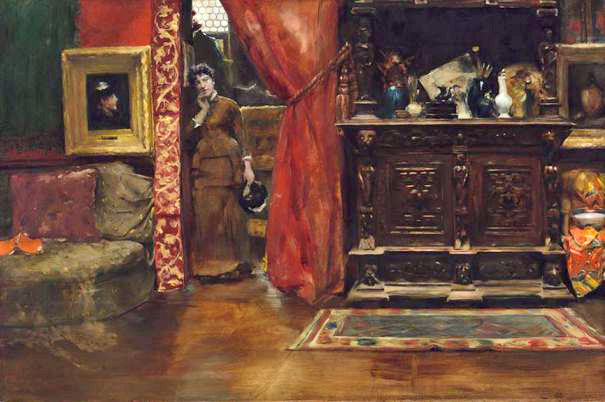
The New Model (1884)

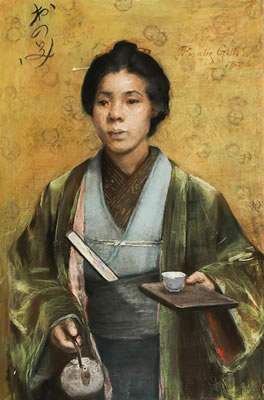
Japanese Woman
