= Joséphine Houssay =

French painter

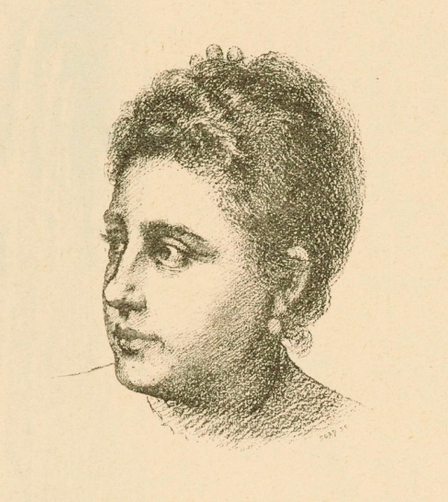
- Born: 1840
- Died: 1914 (aged 73–74)
- Known for: Painting

Signature
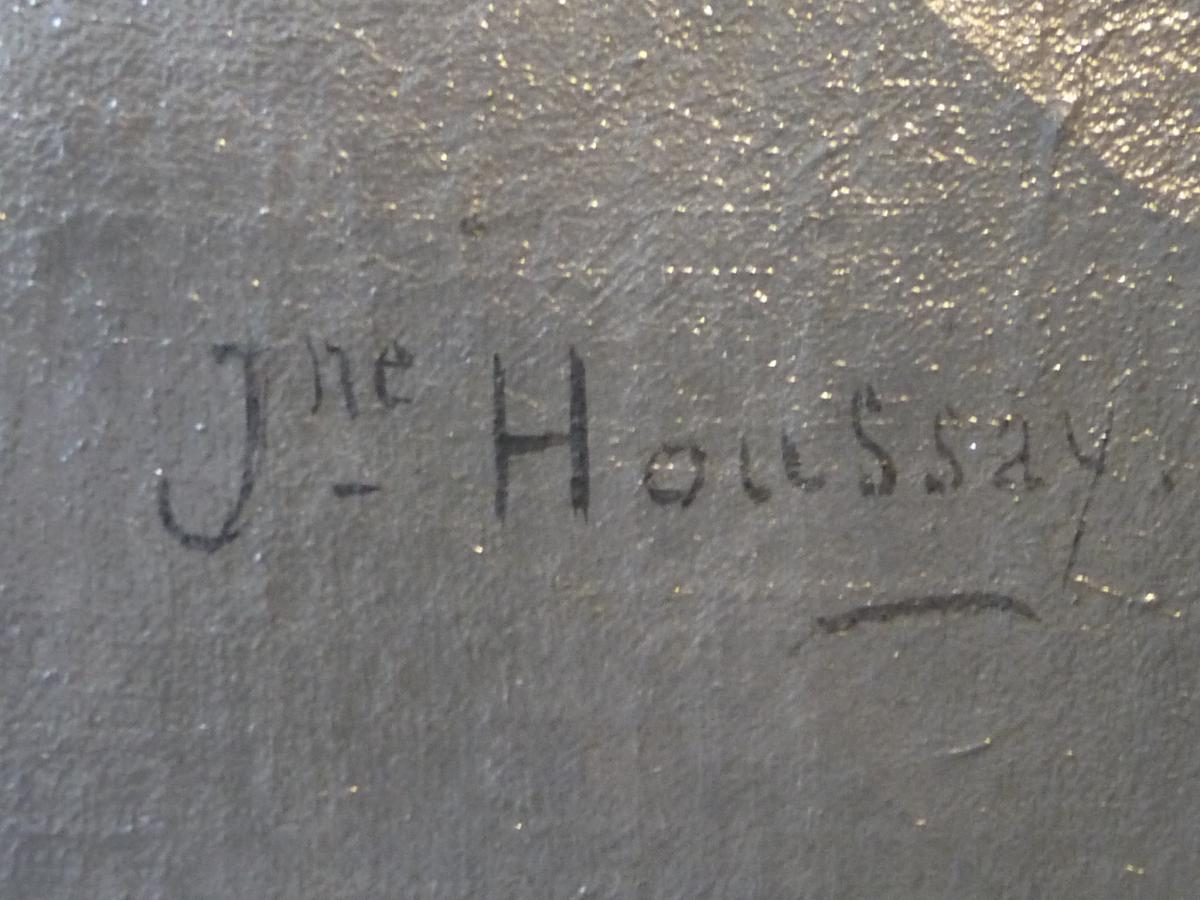

Joséphine Houssay (or, by mistake Joséphine Houssaye; 1840 – 1914) was a French painter.

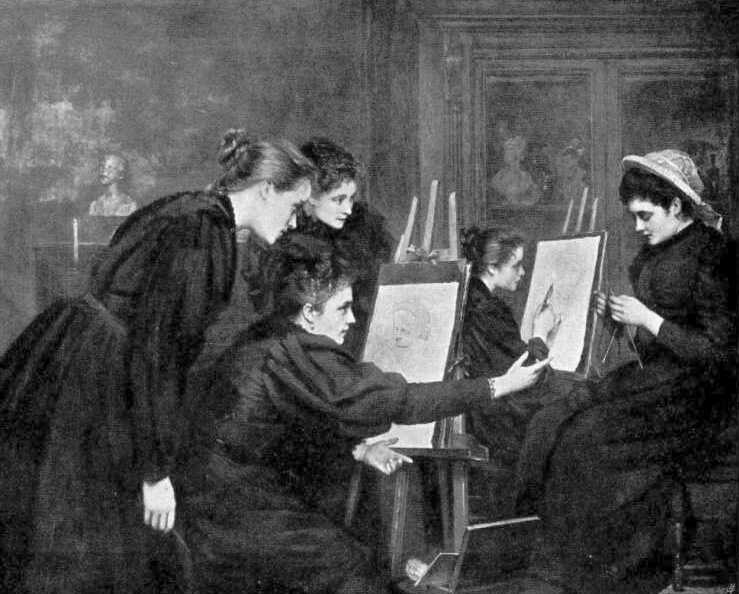
The Lesson

She was a pupil of Tony Robert-Fleury at the Académie Julian. Houssaye exhibited her work at the Palace of Fine Arts and The Woman's Building at the 1893 World's Columbian Exposition in Chicago, Illinois.

Her painting The Lesson, was included in the 1905 book Women Painters of the World.
