= Bañuelos (surname) =

Bañuelos is a surname. Notable people with the surname include:

- Antonia Bañuelos (1856–1926), Spanish painter
- Enrique Bañuelos (born 1966), Spanish businessman and entrepreneur
- Fernanda Bañuelos (born 1997), Mexican volleyball player
- Julio Bañuelos (born 1970), Spanish footballer
- Luis García Bañuelos (born 1993), Mexican footballer
- Manny Bañuelos (born 1991), Mexican baseball player
- Romana Acosta Bañuelos (1925–2018), American banker and government official
