= Sindici =

Sindici is a surname. Notable people with the surname include:

- Francesca Stuart Sindici (1858–c.1929), Spanish-Italian painter
- Oreste Sindici (1828–1904), Italian-born Colombian musician and composer
