= Women Painters of the World =

1905 book listing an overview of women painters

Women Painters of the World, from the time of Caterina Vigri, 1413–1463, to Rosa Bonheur and the present day
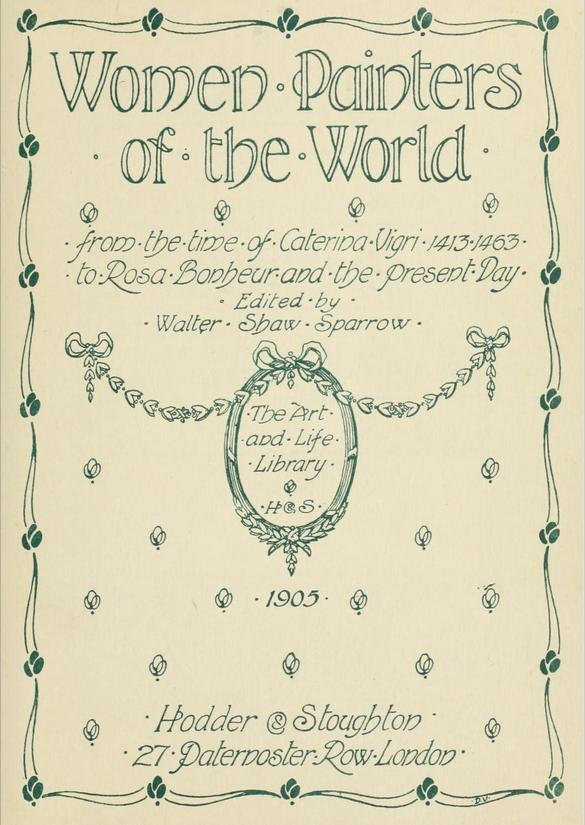
- Author: Walter Shaw Sparrow
- Language: English language
- Genre: Art history
- Publisher: Hodder & Stoughton, Frederick A. Stokes
- Publication date: 1905
- Publication place: United Kingdom
- Pages: 331
- OCLC: 689035

Women Painters of the World, from the time of Caterina Vigri, 1413–1463, to Rosa Bonheur and the present day, assembled and edited by Walter Shaw Sparrow, is a book that lists an overview of prominent women painters up to 1905, the year of publication.

The purpose of the book was to prove wrong the statement that "the achievements of women painters have been second-rate." The book includes well over 300 images of paintings by over 200 painters, most of whom were born in the 19th century and won medals and awards at various international exhibitions. The book is a useful reference work for anyone studying women's art of the late 19th century.

== List of women in the book ==
- Louise Abbéma
- Madame Abran (Marthe Abran, 1866-1908)
- Georges Achille-Fould
- Helen Allingham
- Anna Alma-Tadema
- Laura Theresa Alma-Tadema
- Sophie Gengembre Anderson
- Helen Cordelia Angell
- Sofonisba Anguissola
- Christine Angus
- Berthe Art
- Gerardina Jacoba van de Sande Bakhuyzen
- Antonia de Bañuelos
- Rose Maynard Barton
- Marie Bashkirtseff
- Jeanna Bauck
- Amalie Bauerlë
- Mary Beale
- Lady Diana Beauclerk
- Cecilia Beaux
- Marie-Guillemine Benoist
- Marie Bilders-van Bosse
- Lily Blatherwick
- Tina Blau
- Nelly Bodenheim
- Rosa Bonheur
- Mlle. Bouillier
- Madame Bovi
- Olga Boznanska
- Louise Breslau
- Elena Brockmann
- Jennie Augusta Brownscombe
- Anne Frances Byrne
- Katharine Cameron
- Margaret Cameron (Mary Margaret Cameron)
- Marie Gabrielle Capet
- Margaret Sarah Carpenter
- Madeleine Carpentier
- Rosalba Carriera
- Mary Cassatt
- Marie Cazin
- Francine Charderon
- Marian Emma Chase
- Zoé-Laure de Chatillon
- Jeanne-Elisabeth Chaudet
- Lilian Cheviot
- Mlle. Claudie
- Christabel Cockerell
- Marie Amélie Cogniet
- Uranie Alphonsine Colin-Libour
- Jacqueline Comerre-Paton
- Cornelia Conant
- Delphine Arnould de Cool-Fortin
- Diana Coomans
- Maria Cosway
- Amelia Curran
- Louise Danse
- Héléna Arsène Darmesteter
- Maria Davids
- Césarine Davin-Mirvault
- Evelyn De Morgan
- Jane Mary Dealy
- Virginie Demont-Breton
- Marie Destrée-Danse
- Margaret Isabel Dicksee
- Agnese Dolci
- Angèle Dubos
- Victoria Dubourg
- Clémentine-Hélène Dufau
- Mary Elizabeth Duffield-Rosenberg
- Maud Earl
- Marie Ellenrieder
- Alix-Louise Enault
- Alice Maud Fanner
- Catherine Maria Fanshawe
- Jeanne Fichel
- Rosalie Filleul
- Fanny Fleury
- Julia Bracewell Folkard
- Lavinia Fontana
- Elizabeth Adela Forbes
- Eleanor Fortescue-Brickdale
- Consuélo Fould
- Empress Frederick of Germany
- Elizabeth Jane Gardner
- Artemisia Gentileschi
- Diana Ghisi
- Ketty Gilsoul-Hoppe
- Marie-Éléonore Godefroid
- Eva Gonzalès
- Maude Goodman
- Mary L. Gow
- Kate Greenaway
- Rosina Mantovani Gutti
- Gertrude Demain Hammond
- Emily Hart
- Hortense Haudebourt-Lescot
- Lady Holroyd
- Amelia Hotham
- M. J. A. Houdon
- Joséphine Houssay
- Barbara Elisabeth van Houten
- Sina Mesdag van Houten
- Julia Beatrice How
- Mary Young Hunter
- Helen Hyde
- Katarina Ivanović
- Infanta María de la Paz of Spain
- Blanche Jenkins
- Marie Jensen
- Louisa Jopling
- Mina Karadžić
- Angelica Kauffman
- Lucy E. Kemp-Welch
- Jessie M. King
- Elisa Koch
- Käthe Kollwitz
- Adélaïde Labille-Guiard
- Ethel Larcombe
- Hermine Laucota
- Madame Le Roy
- Louise-Émilie Leleux-Giraud
- Judith Leyster
- Barbara Longhi
- Princess Louise, Duchess of Argyll
- Marie Seymour Lucas
- Marie Lucas Robiquet
- Vilma Lwoff-Parlaghy
- Ann Macbeth
- Biddie Macdonald
- Jessie Macgregor
- Violet Manners, Duchess of Rutland
- E. Marcotte
- Ana Marinković
- Madeline Marrable
- Edith Martineau
- Caroline de Maupeou
- Constance Mayer
- Anne Mee
- Margaret Meen
- Maria S. Merian
- Anna Lea Merritt
- Georgette Meunier
- Eulalie Morin
- Berthe Morisot
- Mary Moser
- Marie Nicolas
- Beatrice Offor
- Adeline Oppenheim Guimard
- Blanche Paymal-Amouroux
- Marie Petiet
- Nadežda Petrović
- Constance Phillott
- Maria Katharina Prestel
- Henrietta Rae
- Suor Barbara Ragnoni
- Catharine Read
- Marie Magdeleine Real del Sarte
- Flora Macdonald Reid
- Maria G. Silva Reis
- Mrs. J. Robertson
- Suze Robertson
- Ottilie Roederstein
- Juana Romani
- Adèle Romany
- Jeanne Rongier
- Henriëtte Ronner-Knip
- Baroness Lambert de Rothschild
- Sophie Rude
- Rachel Ruysch
- Eugénie Salanson
- Adelaïde Salles-Wagner
- Amy Sawyer
- Helene Schjerfbeck
- Félicie Schneider
- Anna Maria Schurman
- Thérèse Schwartze
- Doña Stuart Sindici
- Elisabetta Sirani
- Sienese Nun Sister A
- Sienese Nun Sister B
- Minnie Smythe
- Élisabeth Sonrel
- Lavinia, Countess Spencer
- M. E. Edwards Staples
- Louisa Starr
- Marianne Stokes
- Elizabeth Strong
- Mary Ann Rankin (Mrs. J. M. Swan)
- Annie Louise Swynnerton
- E. De Tavernier
- Elizabeth Upton, Baroness Templetown
- Ellen Thesleff
- Elizabeth Thompson
- Maria Tibaldi m. Subleyras
- Frédérique Vallet-Bisson
- Caroline de Valory
- Mlle. de Vanteuil
- Elisabeth Vigée-Lebrun
- Caterina Vigri
- Vukosava Velimirović
- Beta Vukanović
- Louisa Lady Waterford
- Hermine Waternau
- Caroline Watson
- Cecilia Wentworth
- E. Wesmael
- Florence White
- Maria Wiik
- Julie Wolfthorn
- Juliette Wytsman
- Annie Marie Youngman
- Jenny Zillhardt
