= Fanny Fleury =

French painter

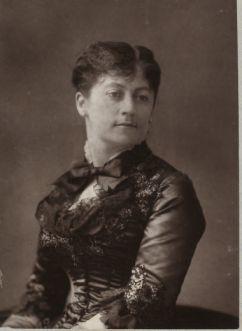
- Born: 1846; Paris, France
- Died: 1923 (aged 76–77); Paris, France
- Education: Emile Auguste Carolus-Duran; Marie Durand; Jean-Jacques Henner
- Known for: Painting

Fanny Fleury (1846–1923) was a French painter.

Fleury was born in Paris, France, and trained with Emile Auguste Carolus-Duran, Marie Durand and Jean-Jacques Henner. She showed works at the Paris Salon from 1869 to 1882, and received an honourable mention at the Exposition Universelle of 1889. Her painting The Pathway to the Village Church was included in the 1905 book Women Painters of the World. Fleury died in Paris.

== Gallery ==
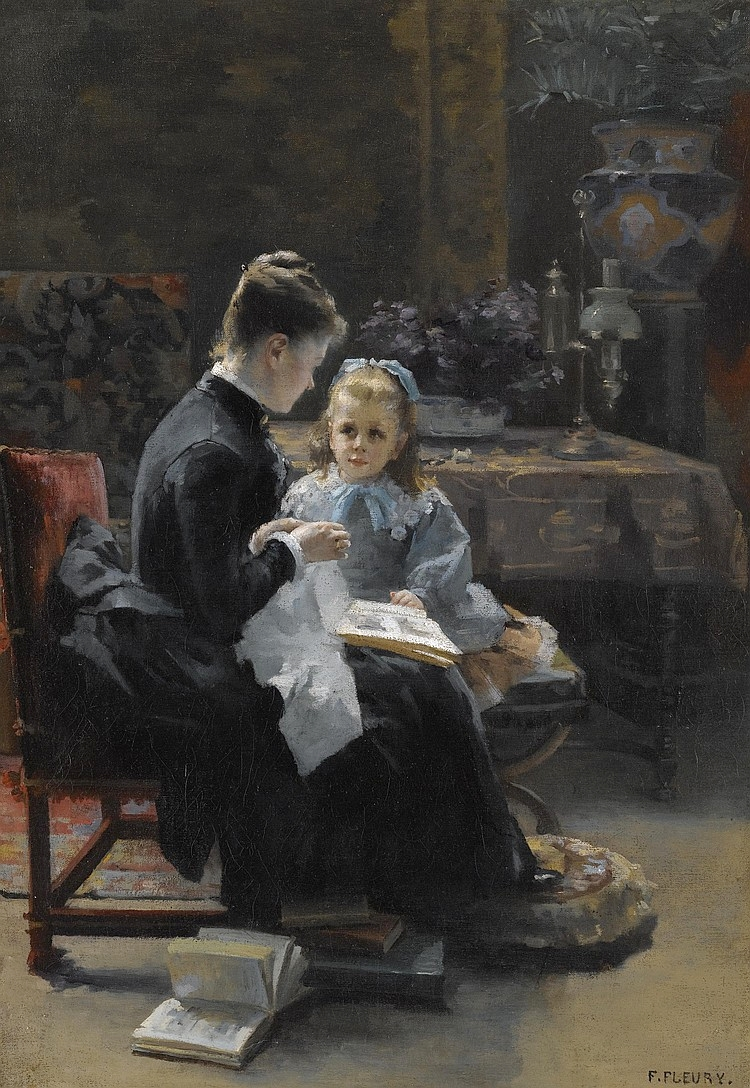
The Lesson

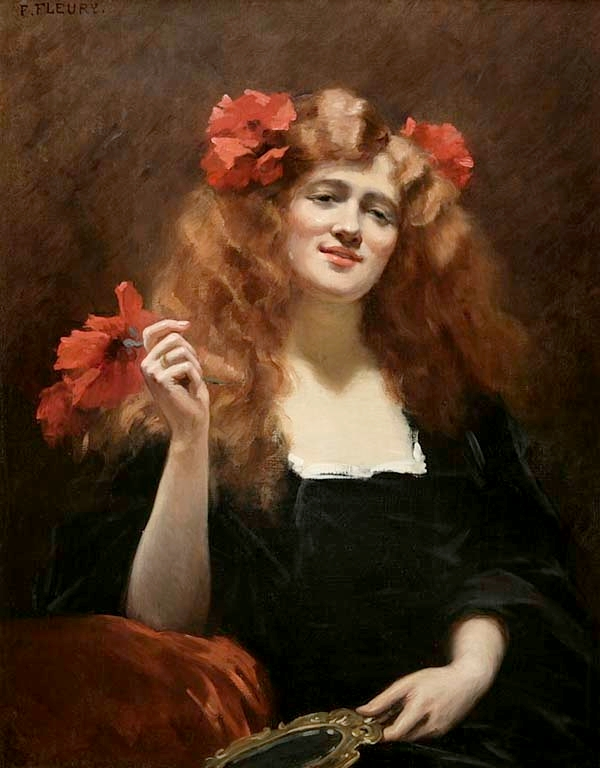
Portrait of an Unknown Woman

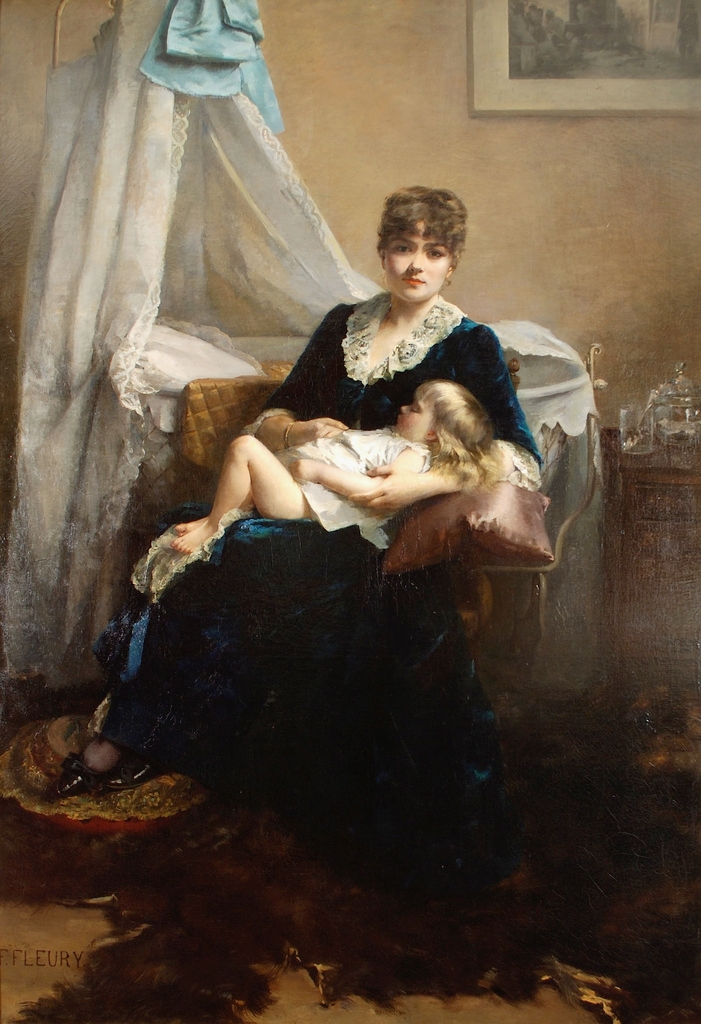
Sleeping Baby
