= Marguerite J. A. Houdon =

French painter

Marguerite-Julie-Antoinette Houdon
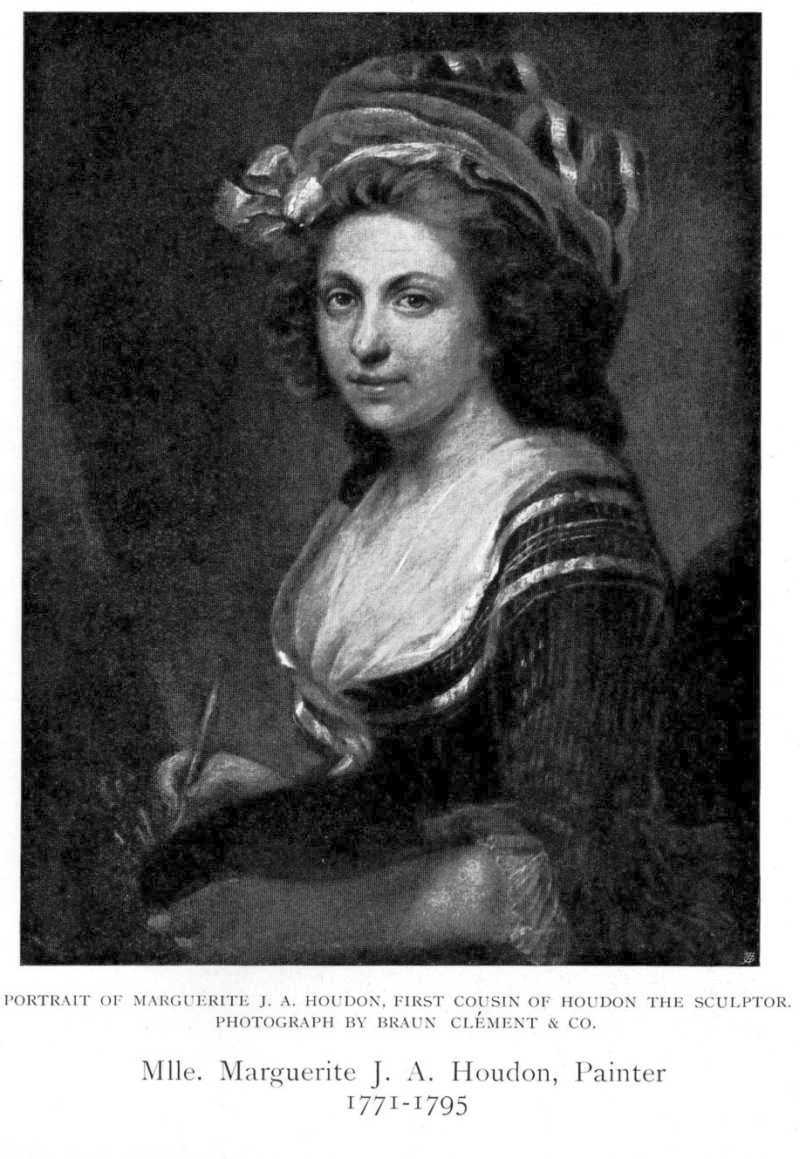
- Born: 1771
- Died: 1795 (aged 23–24)

Marguerite-Julie-Antoinette Houdon (1771 – 1795) was a French painter.

She was the first cousin of the sculptor Jean-Antoine Houdon and her self-portrait was included in the 1905 book Women Painters of the World.
