= Eulalie Morin =

French artist (1765–1837)

- Born: Eulalie Cornillaud; May 27, 1765; Nantes, France
- Died: June 3, 1837 (aged 72)
- Known for: Painting

Eulalie Morin, née Cornillaud (May 27, 1765 – June 3, 1837) was a French painter.

== Biography ==
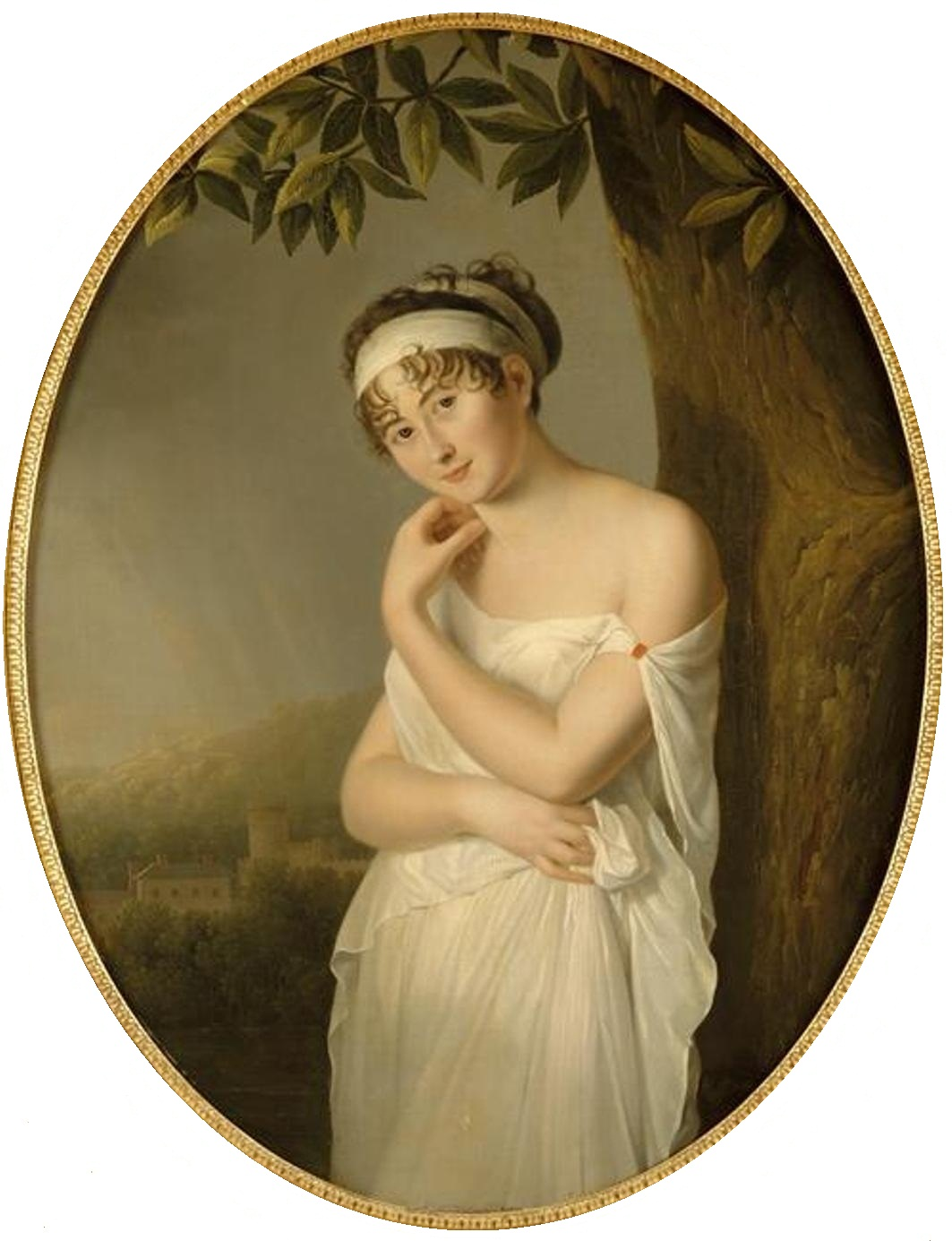
Portrait of Juliette Récamier in Versailles

Morin was born in Nantes, France to Jacques Cornillaud and Eulalie Barbaux. She was trained as a painter in the studio of Guillaume Lethière (1760–1832) and may have also studied with Jean-Baptiste Isabey (1767–1806). Morin is best known for her miniatures and portraits. Between 1798 and 1804, she exhibited work at the Paris Salon. Her Portrait of Juliette Récamier, now located in the Musée national des châteaux de Versailles et de Trianon, was exhibited 1799 Salon and included in the 1905 book Women Painters of the World. A copy was owned by Madame de Staël and kept in her bedroom at Coppet Castle, in Switzerland.

Morin is thought to have taught art to the daughters of Elisa Bonaparte, Napoléon's younger sister.
