= Marie Petiet =

French painter (1854–1893)

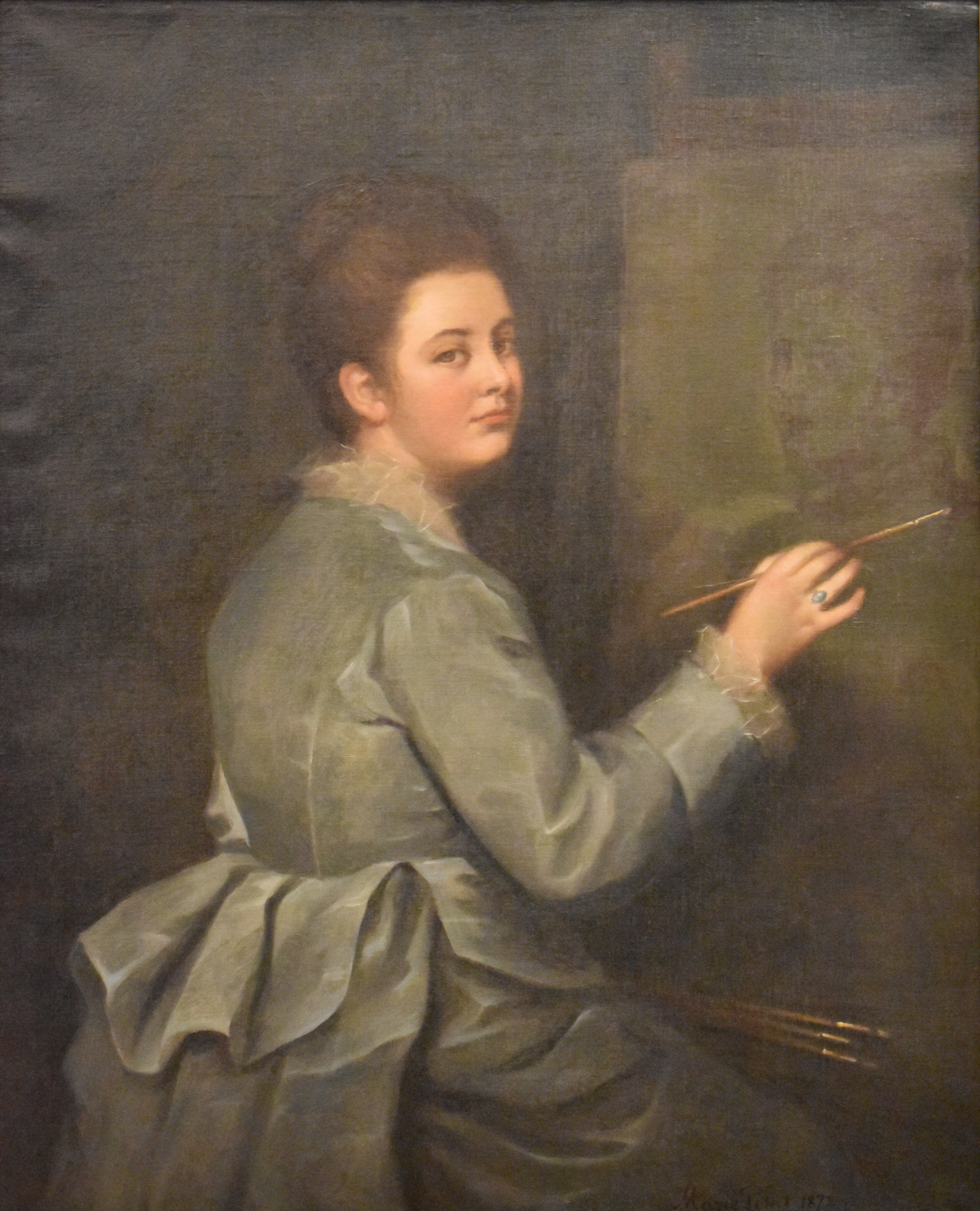
- Self-portrait at her easel, 1872
- Born: Marie Petiet; 20 July 1854; Limoux, France
- Died: 16 April 1893 (aged 38); Paris, France
- Known for: Painting
- Spouse: Étienne Dujardin-Beaumetz (m. 1886)

Marie Petiet or Marie Dujardin-Beaumetz (1854–1893) was a French painter known for her genre scenes and portraits.

== Biography ==
Dujardin-Beaumetz née Petiet was born on 20 July 1854 in Limoux, France the daughter of the painter Léopold Petiet. She studied with the painters Jean-Jacques Henner and Louis Hector Leroux from 1877 through 1883.

She married the painter Étienne Dujardin-Beaumetz 1886 and began showing her work under the name Marie Dujardin-Beaumetz.

She exhibited at the Société des Artistes Français from 1877 through 1883. She also exhibited at the Paris Salon.

Petiet died on 16 April 1893 in Paris.

== Legacy ==
Her works are preserved in the Musée Petiet de Limoux. Her work Knitter asleep was included in the book Women Painters of the World. Petiet was included in the 2018 exhibit Women in Paris 1850-1900.

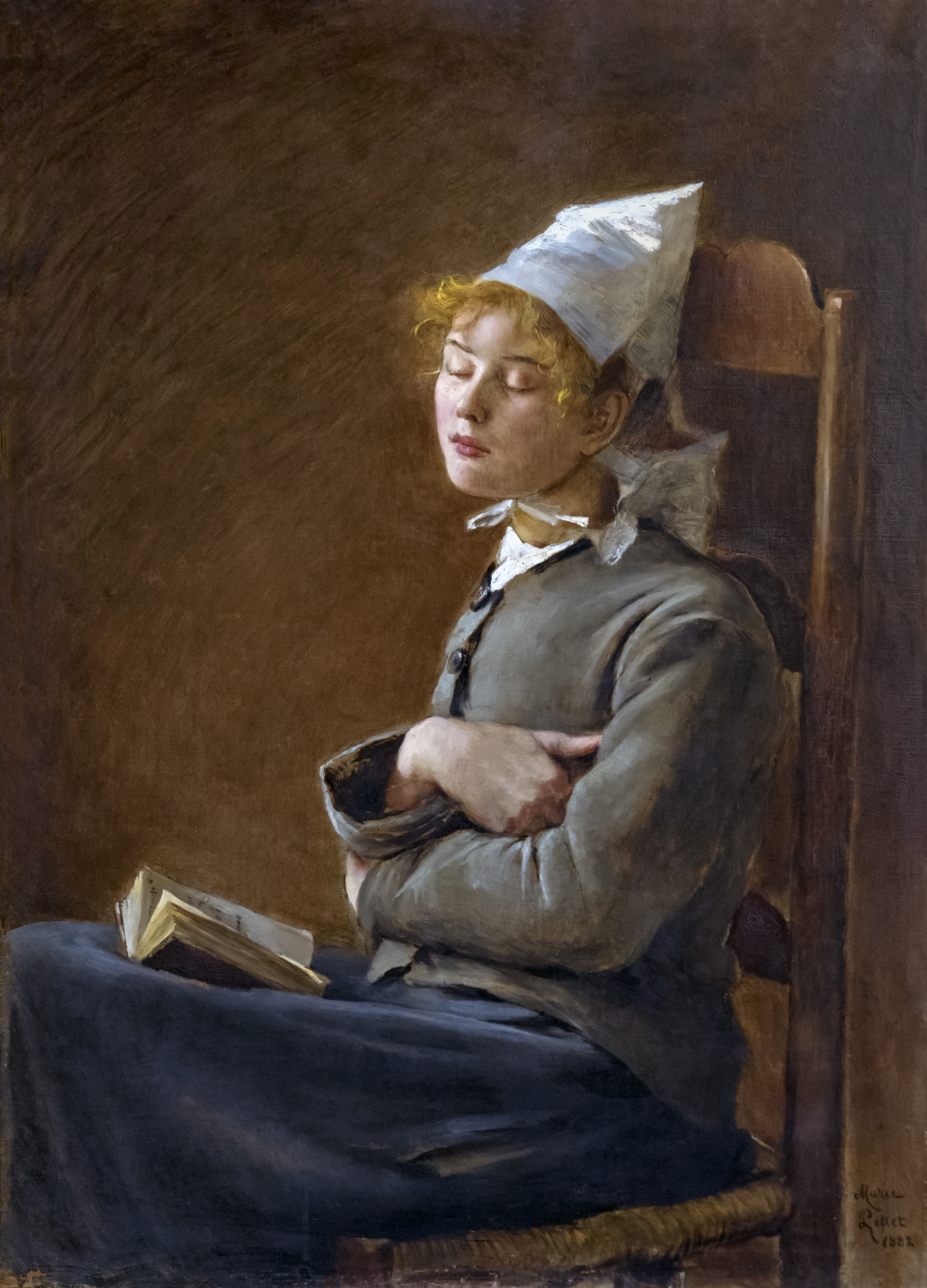
Liseuse endormie (Girl Asleep) Musée des Beaux-Arts de Carcassonne
