= Angèle Dubos =

French painter

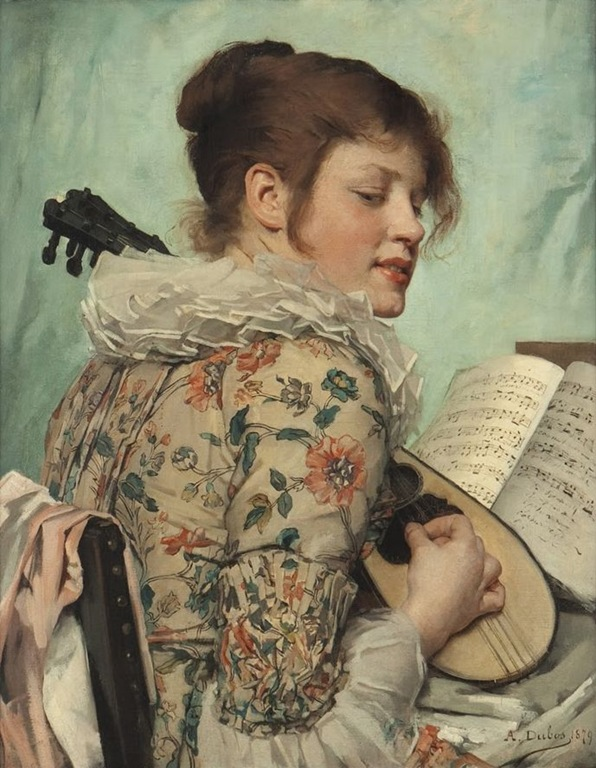
- A New Song (1879)
- Born: Laure Constance Angèle Dubos; 22 December 1844; L'Aigle, France
- Died: 26 November 1916 (aged 71)
- Spouse: Pierre Louis Bourdon

Angèle Dubos (22 December 1844 − 26 November 1916) was a French painter from Normandy. Dubos was born Laure Constance Angèle Dubos in 1844 in L'Aigle in the north of France, and showed her works at the Paris Salon.

== Biography ==
Born in 1844 in the department of Orne, Angèle learned painting in Paris as a pupil of the French painter Charles Chaplin (1825-1891). Right from the start, the quality of her work attracted attention. Thus when she exhibited La Prière at the Salon of 1866, a columnist from the magazine Le Foyer said "... a talent that announced itself in such a naive and touching way, revealing serious and good qualities, auguring very well for the artistic future of Miss Dubos."

She was very active in art exhibitions, Parisian and regional, from 1867 to 1884. In 1873, she won the gold medal at an exhibition in Caen with her painting Rolande. The painting was then bought by the municipality for its museum. Dubos' technique was recognized and appreciated by her peers and critics. In 1876, a critic will say during the Salon of 1876 where she exhibited her painting La Sultane: "She paints in a friendly way, with enthusiasm, ease and softness in the execution." In 1886, in La Revue Normande et Parisienne, she is cited as one of Chaplin's best pupils when she exhibited her drawing Le Déjeûner de Mlle Rose.

Angèle married in her late 50's in June 1901, to Pierre Louis Bourdon, postmaster of Corrèze.

Her painting The New Song, dated 1879, was included in the 1905 book Women Painters of the World.

She was a member of the Norman Academy and the date of her death is unknown although 26 November 1916 has been proposed.

== Selected works ==
- La Prière (1866)
- Rolande (1873)
- In room (1876)
- La Sultane (1876)
- A New Song (1879)
