= Elena Brockmann =

Spanish artist (1867–1946)

- Born: 2 November 1867; Madrid
- Died: January 26, 1946 (aged 78); Madrid

Francisca María Brockmann y Llanos (1867–1946) was a Spanish historical painter.

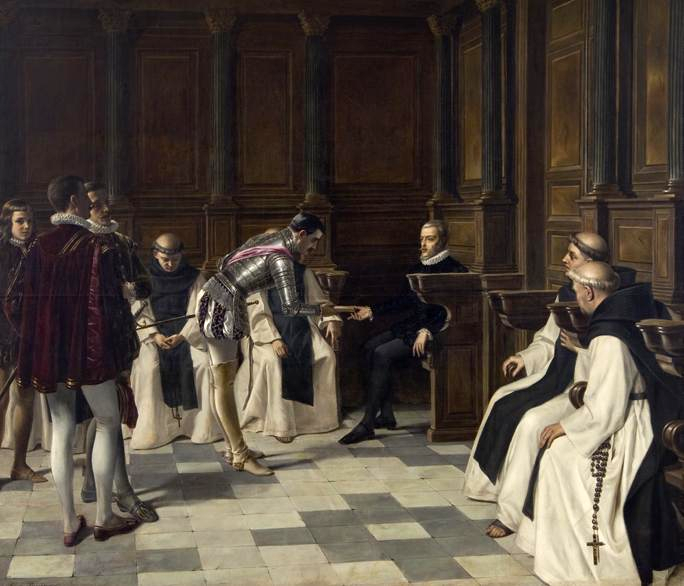
Philip II receiving news of the loss of the Armada, 1895

Brockmann was born in Madrid as the granddaughter of Fanny Keats (the sister of the poet), whose portrait she painted. Her uncle Juan Llanos y Keats gave her painting lessons and she also studied with the history painter José Benlliure y Gil, where she was influenced by Joaquin Sorolla. She won awards in 1887 and 1892 at the Exposiciones Nacionales de Bellas Artes.

Her painting Outside a Roman Hostelry was included in the 1905 book Women Painters of the World.
