= Eugénie Salanson =

French painter

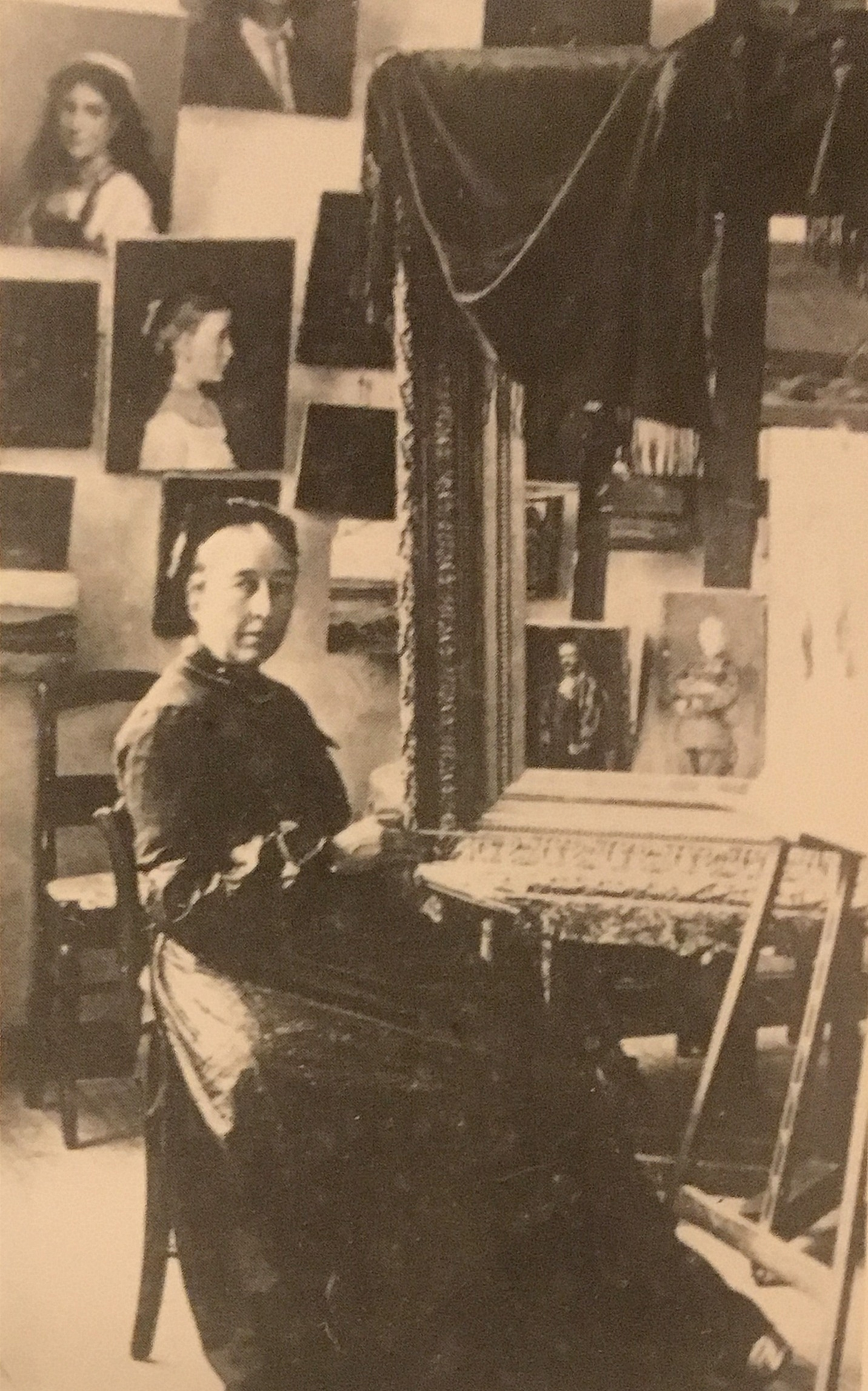
- Born: Eugénie Alexandrine Marie Salanson; 15 December 1836; Albert, Somme, France
- Died: 23 July 1912 (aged 75); Saint-Pair-sur-Mer, France
- Known for: Painting

Eugénie Alexandrine Marie Salanson (15 December 1836, Albert - 23 July 1912, Saint-Pair-sur-Mer) was a French painter in the Academic style.

== Biography ==
Her father came from Ispagnac to Albert to serve as a tariff collector. The family later moved to Saint-Valery-sur-Somme, where her twin sisters were born, then on to Saint-Omer, where her father had been appointed Receiver (head tax collector).

It was near there, in Calais, that she took her first art lessons from a local artist named Crocher. She then went to Paris to continue her studies but, at that time, the École des Beaux-arts did not accept female applicants, so she attended the Académie Julian, where she studied with William Bouguereau. Later, she took private lessons from Léon Cogniet. In 1877, she exhibited her portrait of Cogniet at the Salon, which brought her numerous commissions. The following year, she participated in the Exposition Universelle.

Soon, she was exhibiting throughout France and abroad. Braun, Clément & Co made reproductions of her most popular works and sold them internationally until 1928, when the company went out of business. In 1882 she, Camille Claudel, Jessie Lipscomb and others set up their own studio on the Rue Notre-Dame-des-Champs.

By the end of the 1880s, she was able to acquire the "Villa Saint-Joseph" in the growing seaside resort of Saint-Pair-sur-Mer. This inspired her to create her best known paintings, depicting the young fisherwomen who worked nearby. Her painting "A marée basse" (At Low tide) was one of the works featured in Women Painters of the World by Walter Shaw Sparrow (1905); one of the first books that treated female artists as worthy of serious attention.

She divided her time between Paris and her villa, and died there at the age of seventy-five. Most of her works are in private collections.

== Selected paintings ==
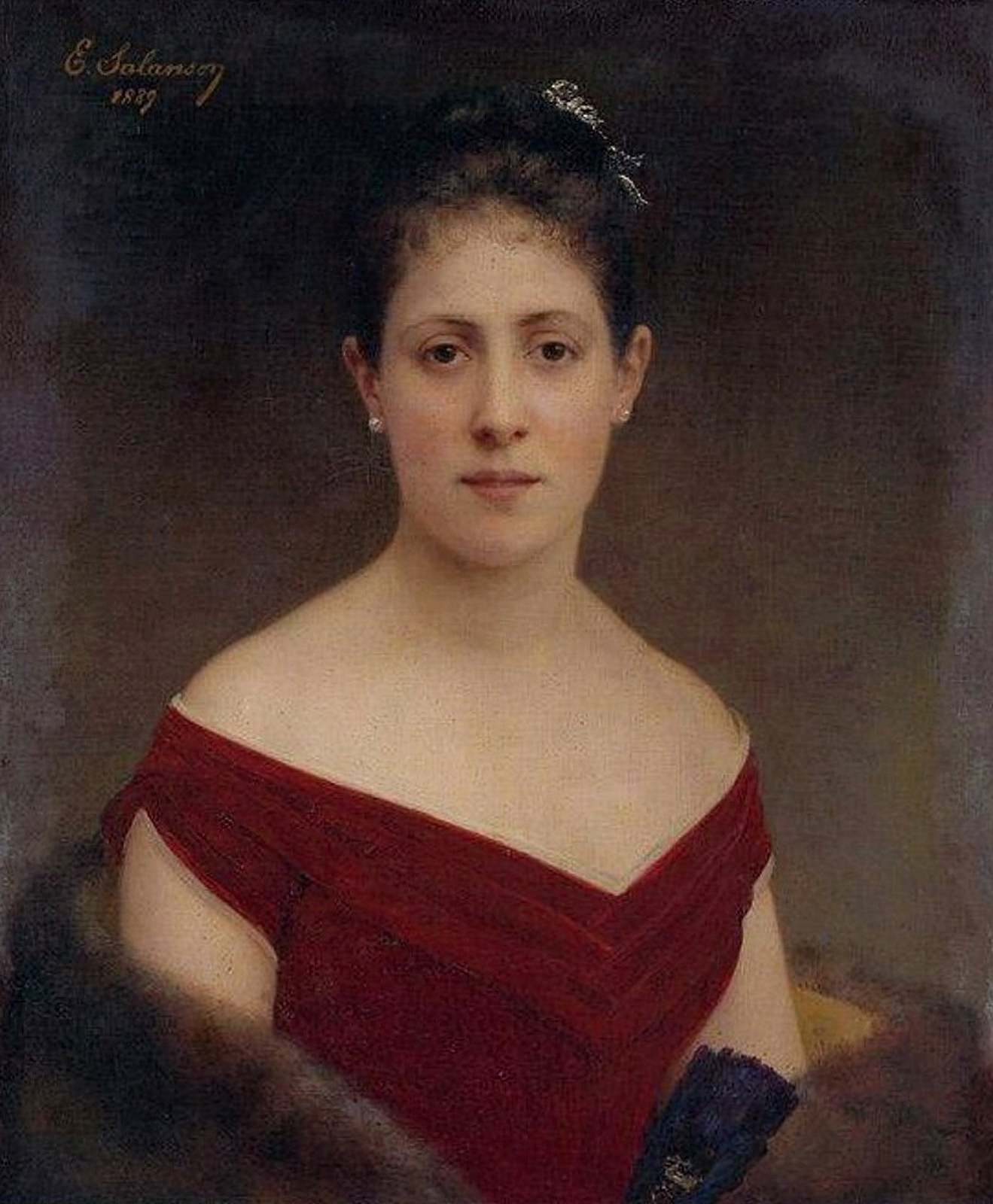
The Marquise de Croix (1889)

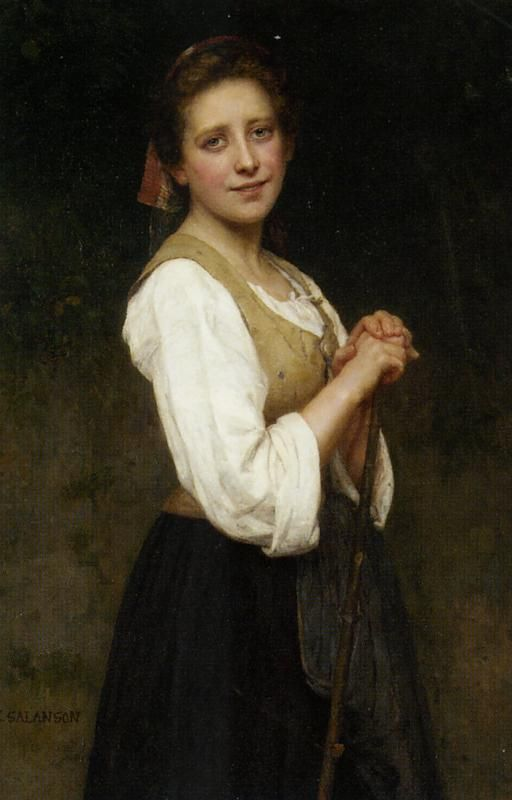
Young Shepherdess

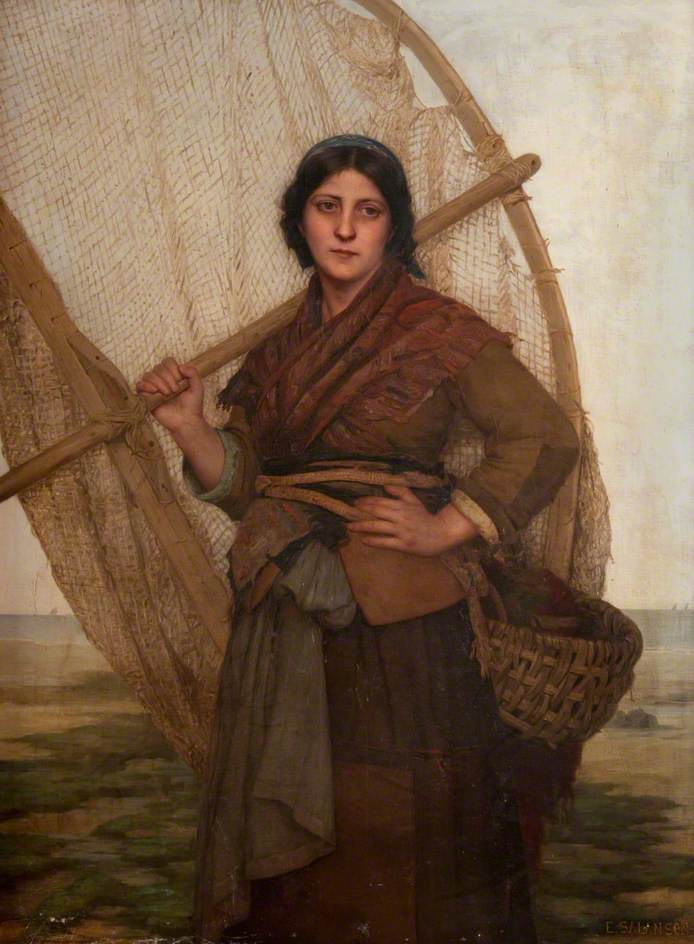
The Shrimp Fisher (1882)

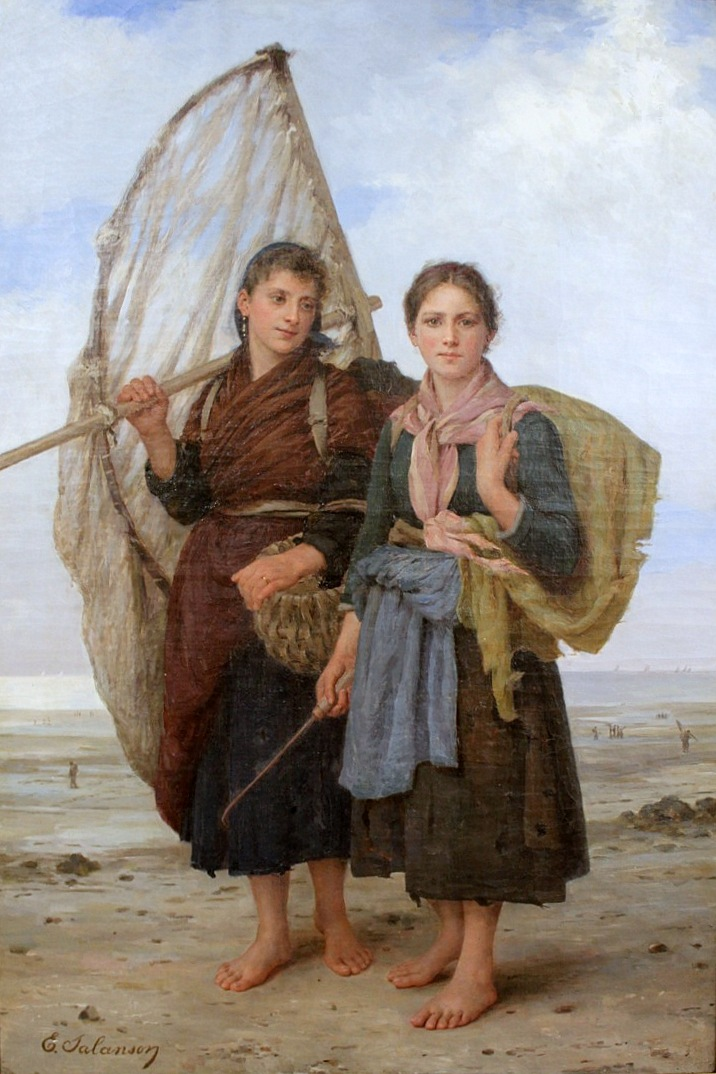
At Low Tide (1890)
