= Hermine Waterneau =

French painter

- Born: 1862; Paris
- Died: 16 September 1916 (aged 53–54); Athis-Mons
- Occupation: Painter

Hermine Waterneau or Waternau (1862–1916) was a French painter.

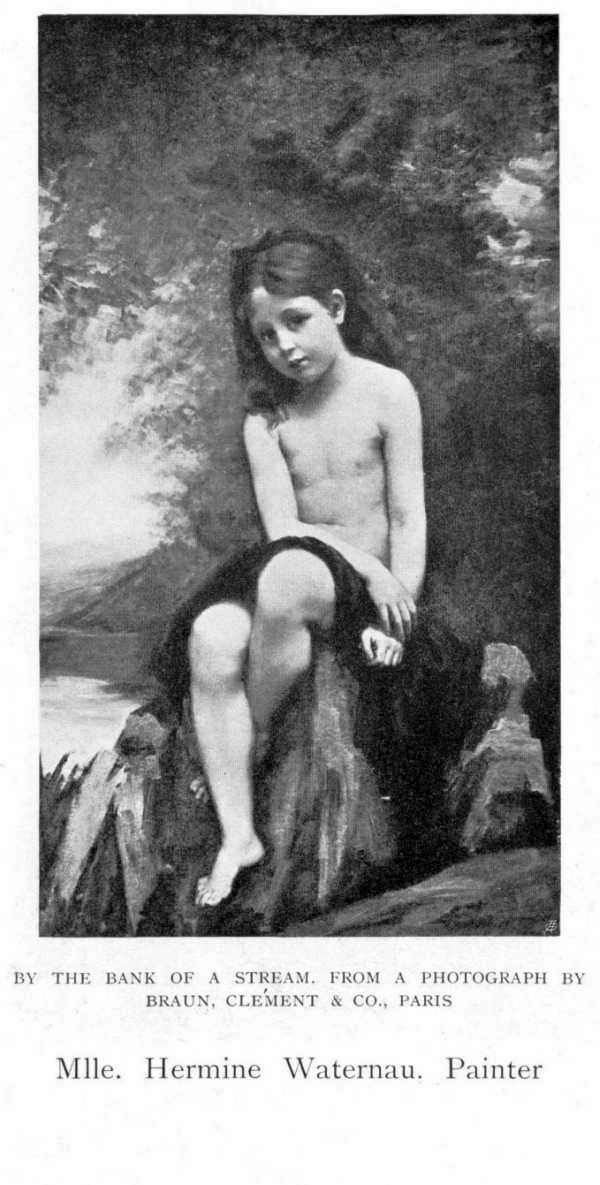
By the Bank of a Stream

She was the daughter of Louis Aimé Waternau, French colonel commander of the Légion d'honneur after the Battle of Wörth, who died in 1879. She became a pupil of Delphine Arnould de Cool-Fortin and showed work at the Paris Salon from 1878 when she showed a portrait of her father. Her work By the Bank of a Stream was included in the book Women Painters of the World.

She died of a heart attack together with her maid Ermunde Serre, and their bodies were discovered by authorities when neighbors were alarmed by their absence.
