= Caroline de Maupeou =

French painter

- Born: 31 December 1836; Mulhouse
- Died: 1915 (aged 78–79)

Caroline de Maupeou née Koechlin (1836 – 1915) was a French painter.

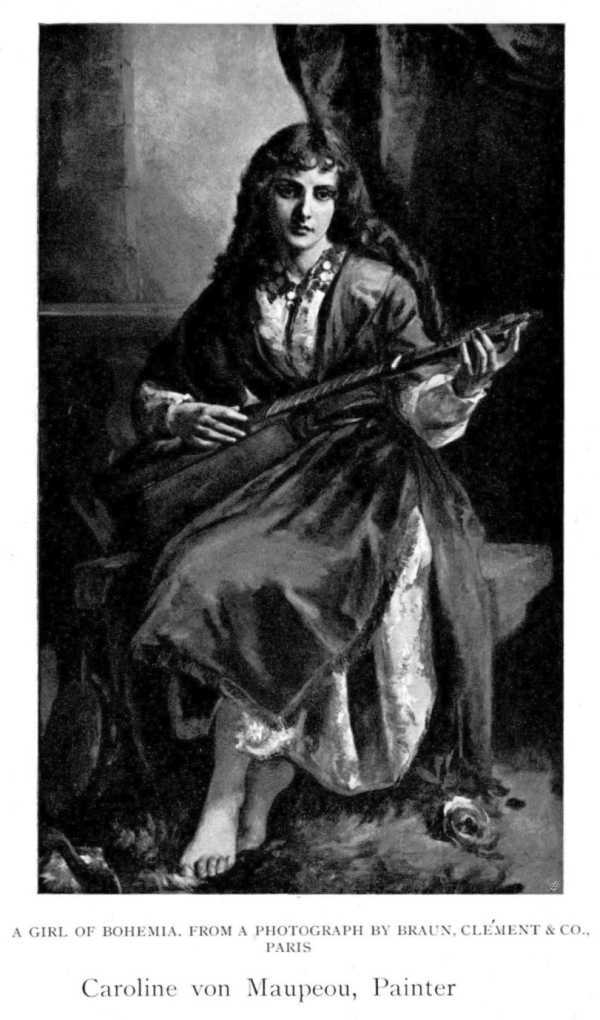
Girl of Bohemia

She was born in Mulhouse and was trained by Léon Bonnat and Charles Chaplin. She married Count René de Maupeou on 15 February 1855 in Mulhouse. She exhibited her work in Paris at the Salon des Artistes Français from 1878 to 1889. Her painting Girl of Bohemia was included in the 1905 book Women Painters of the World.
