= Francine Charderon =

French painter

- Born: 6 April 1861; Lyon
- Died: 25 October 1928 (aged 67)

Francine Charderon or Françoise-Pauline Chardéron (6 April 1861 – 25 October 1928) was a French portrait painter.

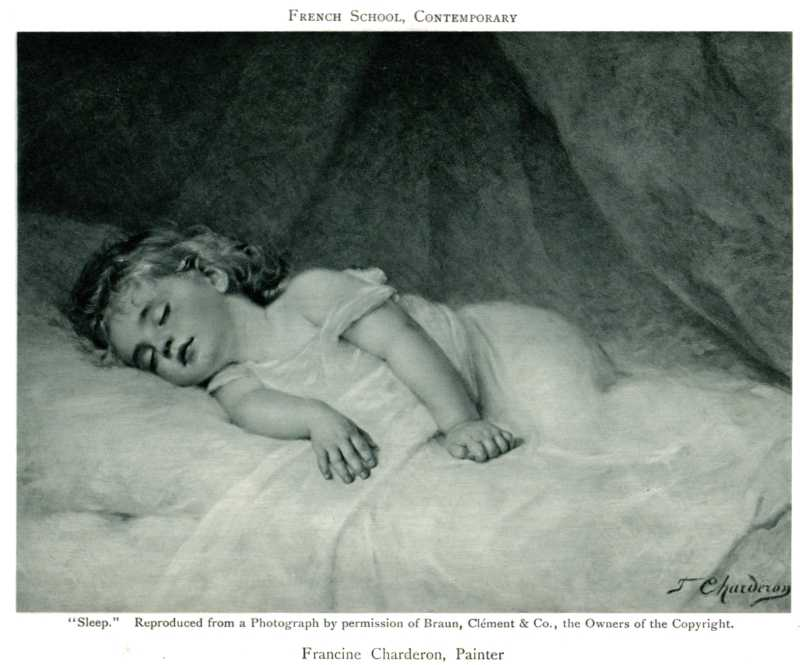
Sleep

Charderon was born in Lyon and trained first under Rey and Loubet, then took lessons with Ernest Hébert and Carolus-Duran in Paris. She opened a studio in Lyons. Her work Sleep was included in the book Women Painters of the World.
