= Louise-Émilie Leleux-Giraud =

Swiss artist (1824–1885)

- Born: 25 March 1824; Geneva
- Died: 6 May 1885 (aged 61); Paris

Louise-Émilie Leleux-Giraud (1824 – 1885) was a Swiss painter active in France.

== Life ==
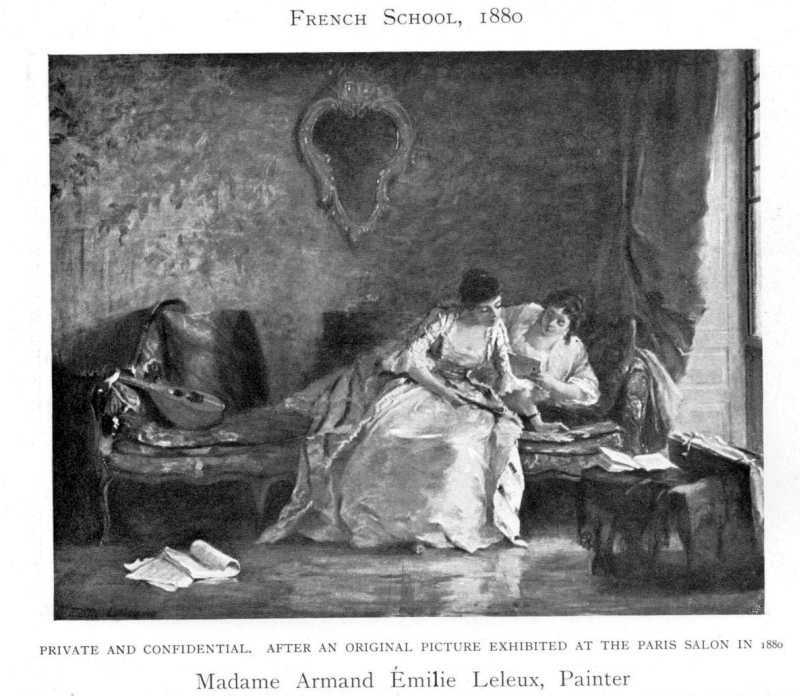
Private and Confidential, 1880

Leleux-Giraud was born in Geneva and grew up in Dardagny, a village in the rural part of the canton of Geneva near the French border, where her parents owned a small château.

In Geneva she became a pupil of Albert Lugardon there. She then attended the school of Leon Cogniet in Paris. She married the French painter Armand Leleux and showed numerous paintings at the Paris Salon. Her work Private and Confidential was included in the book Women Painters of the World.

Leleux-Giraud and Leleux died within a few weeks in Paris. Both are buried at the cemetery of Malval in Dardagny, where the couple spent much of their time together.
