= Rosina Mantovani Gutti =

Italian painter (1851–1943)

- Born: 1851; Italy, Rome
- Died: 1943 (aged 91–92); Rome

Rosina Mantovani Gutti (1851–1943) was an Italian painter. She was the daughter of the Ferrara painter Alessandro Mantovani; Gutti entered into the same circles of the Nazarene painter Ludovico Seitz. Rosina Mantovani Gutti became famous for her delicate pastels. Her portraits of women and children were exhibited in Paris, where she stayed for a period. In her much later year's she moved to Berlin.

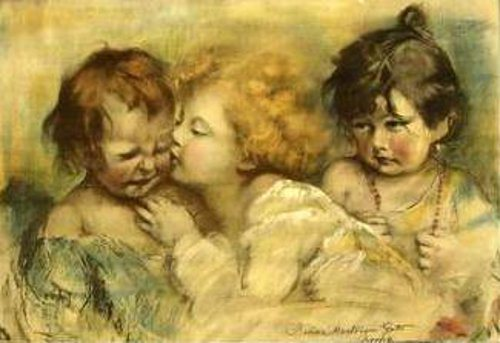
The Peacemaker

== Life ==
Gutti was born in Rome, then part of the Papal States. Her work The Peacemaker was included in the book Women Painters of the World. This became a popular print and was the primary illustration on an Australian poster for WWI war bonds. The image was also used on a Canadian WWI poster "For Your Children Buy War Savings Certificates and they will live to thank you". A sketch of this group titled "Three infants" is in the collection of the British National Trust.

She is known for portraits of children, but she also made a portrait of the actress Eleonora Duse. Gutti died in Rome in 1943. Her published work was in copyright until 2013.
