= Florence White (painter) =

British painter

- Born: 1860s
- Died: 1932

Florence White or Miss F. White (c.1860s – 1932) was a British portrait and miniature painter.

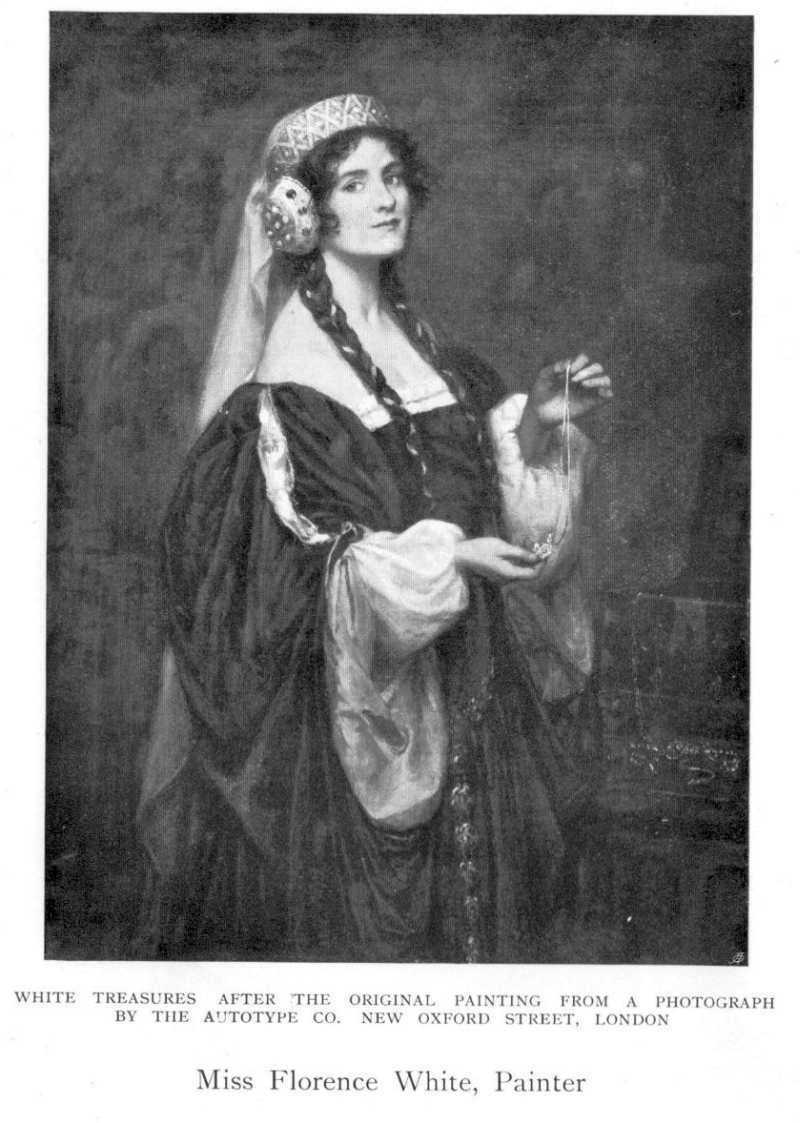
White Treasures

She showed works from 1881 to 1917. Her work White Treasures was included in the book Women Painters of the World. She was a member of the Society of Lady Artists.
