= Adelaïde Salles-Wagner =

French painter (1825–1890)

Adèlaïde Salles-Wagner
- Born: Adelheid Wagner; 1825; Dresden, Germany
- Died: 2 July 1890 (aged 64–65); Paris, France

Adelaïde Salles-Wagner (1825–1890; born Adelheid Wagner) was a German-born painter active in France. She was a pupil of Claude Jacquand in Lyon, and Joseph Bernhardt in Munich or Paris.

She married the painter Jules Salles from Nîmes, France, in 1865.

She is known for portraits and genre works of children. Her work Breton Girl Praying was included in the book Women Painters of the World.

Her sister Elise Puyroche-Wagner also became a painter.

== Works in public collections ==
- Grenoble, Musée de Grenoble: La Petite Villageoise, 1853, oil on canvas
- Lyon, musée des Beaux-Arts: Élie dans le désert, oil on canvas
- Le Puy-en-Velay, Musée Crozatier: Portrait de Monsieur le comte de Macheco, oil on canvas
- Narbonne, Musée d'Art et d'Histoire: Addio Teresa, 1865, oil on canvas
- Toulon, Musée d'Art: Sainte Madeleine bercée par les anges, 1868, oil on canvas
- Roanne, Musée des Beaux-Arts et d'Archéologie Joseph-Déchelette, Portrait de Mme Raoul Chassain de la Plasse, née Meugniot, vers 1869-1870.
Selected works by Adélaïde Salles-Wagner

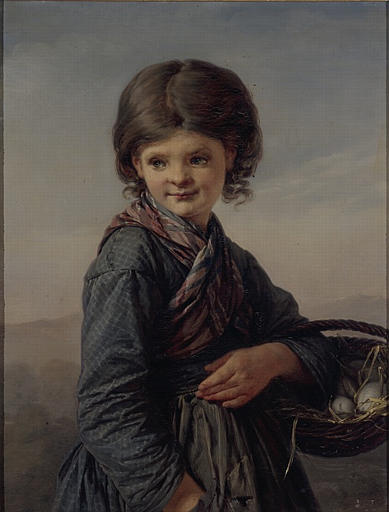
Girl with a Basket (1853), Museum of Grenoble

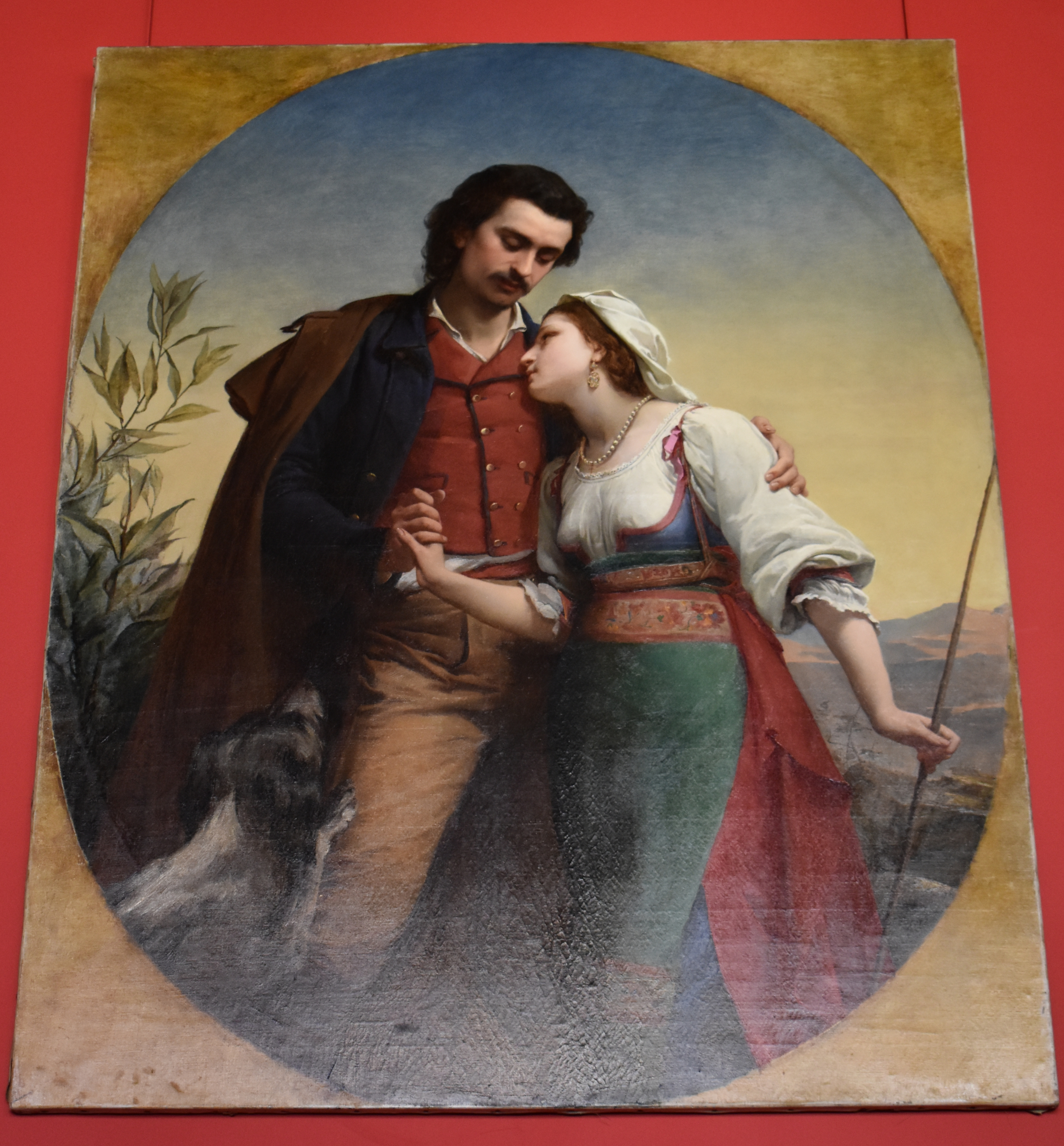
Addio Teresa (1865), musée d'Art et d'Histoire de Narbonne.

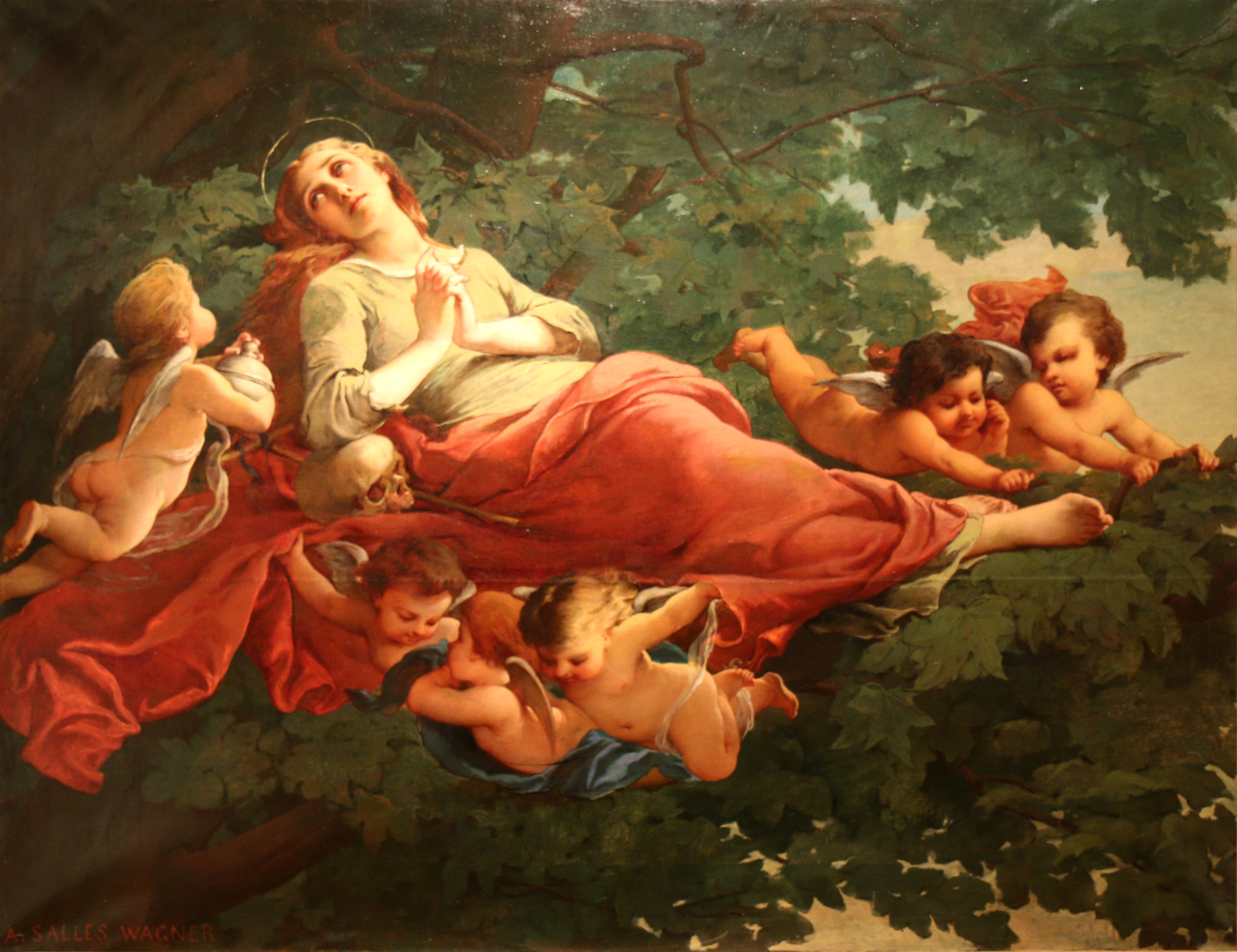
Saint Magdalene cradled by angels (1868), Toulon Museum of Art

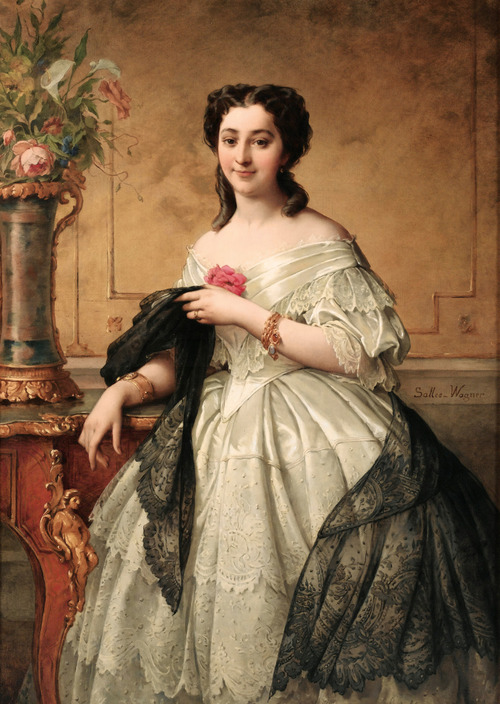
Portrait d'une dame de la société lyonnaise, (location unknown).

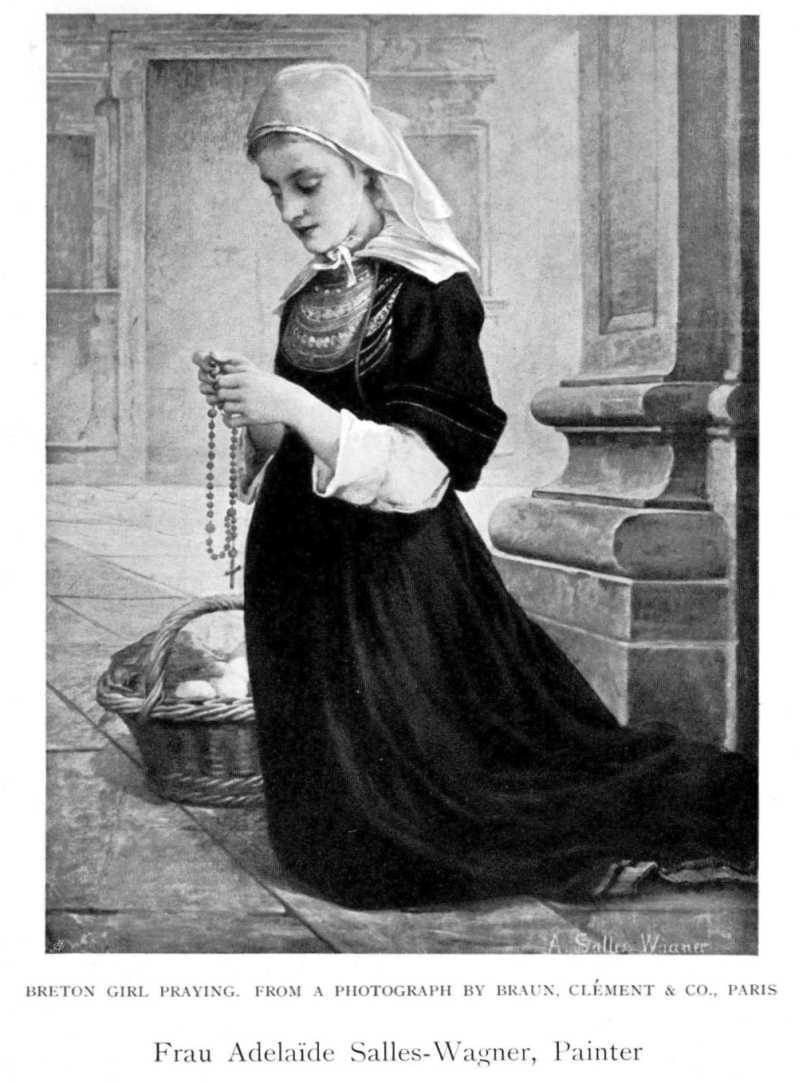
Breton Girl Praying, (location unknown)
