= Blanche Paymal-Amouroux =

French painter

- Born: 1860; Paris, France
- Died: 1910 (aged 49–50)

Blanche Paymal-Amouroux (1860 – 1910) was a French painter.

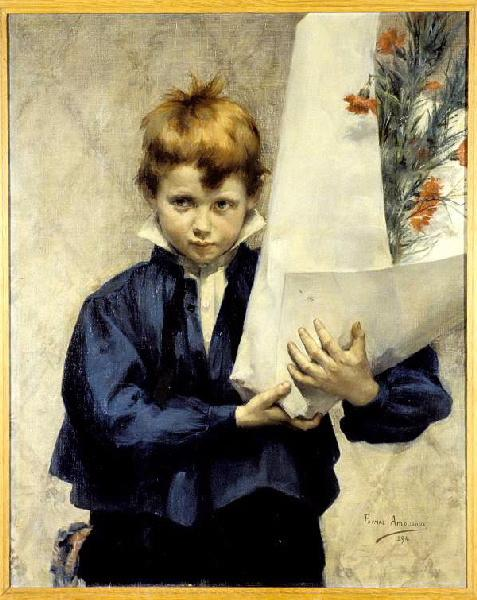
A Holiday at Sosthene, 1894

Paymal-Amouroux was born in Paris. Her 1894 work A Holiday at Sosthene was included in the book Women Painters of the World. It is kept today in the Musée des Beaux-Arts de Rouen.
