= Elisa Koch =

Italian painter

Élisa Koch
- Born: 1833; Livorno
- Died: 1914 (aged 80–81)

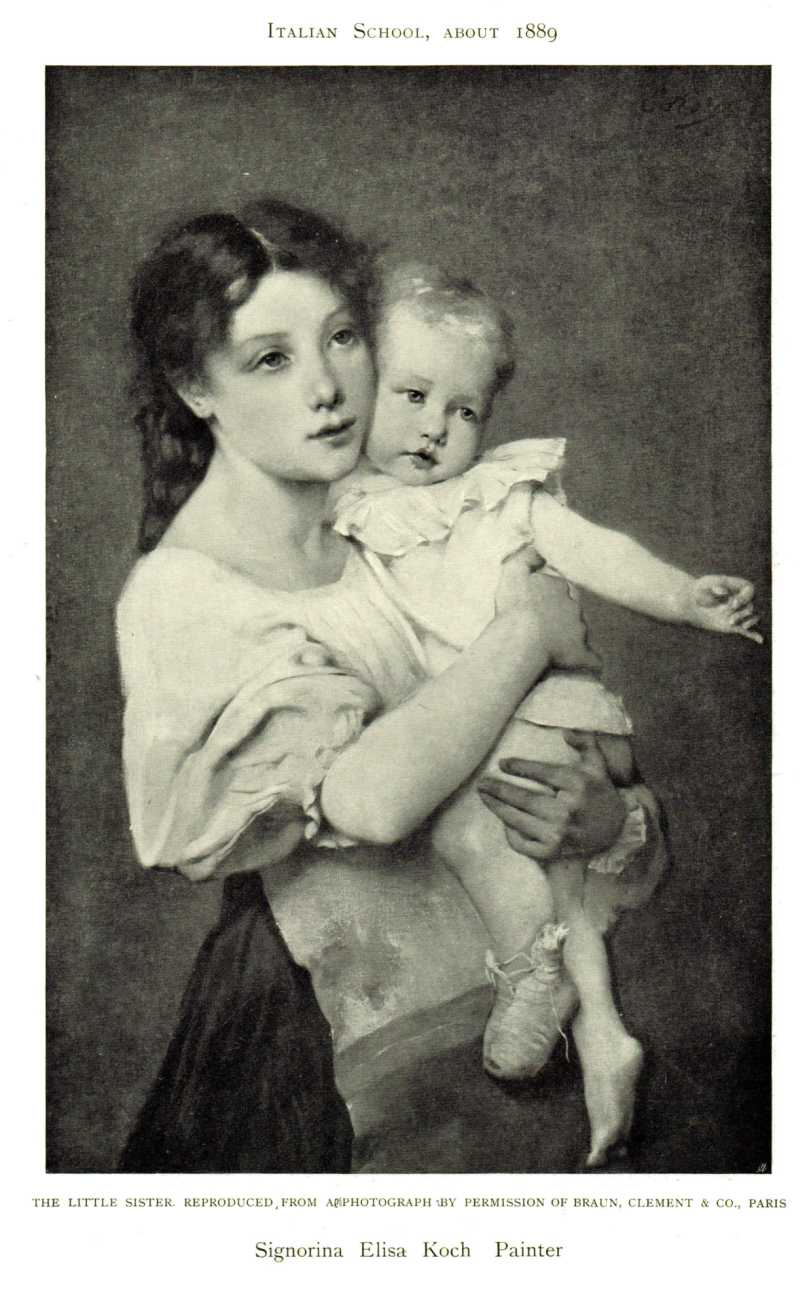
The Little Sister

Élisa Koch or Elisa Kock (1833–1914) was an Italian painter and pastellist.

== Life ==
Koch was born in Livorno and studied under Louis Janmot and Charles Comte. She exhibited in Lyon from 1854 to 1855 and in Paris from 1863 showing most notably Dangerous Encounter at the Paris Salon of 1868, You'll Have None of It at the Paris Salon of 1874, Misfortune at the Paris Salon of 1881, and Portrait of Mademoiselle Juliette Dodu. Her work The Little Sister was included in the book Women Painters of the World, published in 1905.
