= Alice Maud Fanner =

British painter

- Born: 1865; Surrey, England
- Died: 1930 (aged 64–65); Essex, England
- Education: Slade School of Art
- Known for: Landscape painter

Alice Maud Fanner, later Alice Maud Taite, (1865 – 1930) was a British landscape painter.

== Biography ==
Fanner was born in Surrey and for many years lived in the Chiswick area of London. She studied at the Richmond School of Art and also taught there. She attended Slade School of Art in London. She was a pupil of Albert Julius Olsson. Like Olsson, Fanner often painted the sea and the coast, as well as yachts and sailing scenes. Riverside Landscape was included in the book Women Painters of the World. She had five paintings shown at the Royal Academy in London, the first of which was exhibited there in 1897. Fanner was a member of the New English Art Club and exhibited multiple works there between 1897 and 1917. She married Arthur Edward Taite in 1890.
