= Zoé-Laure de Chatillon =

French painter

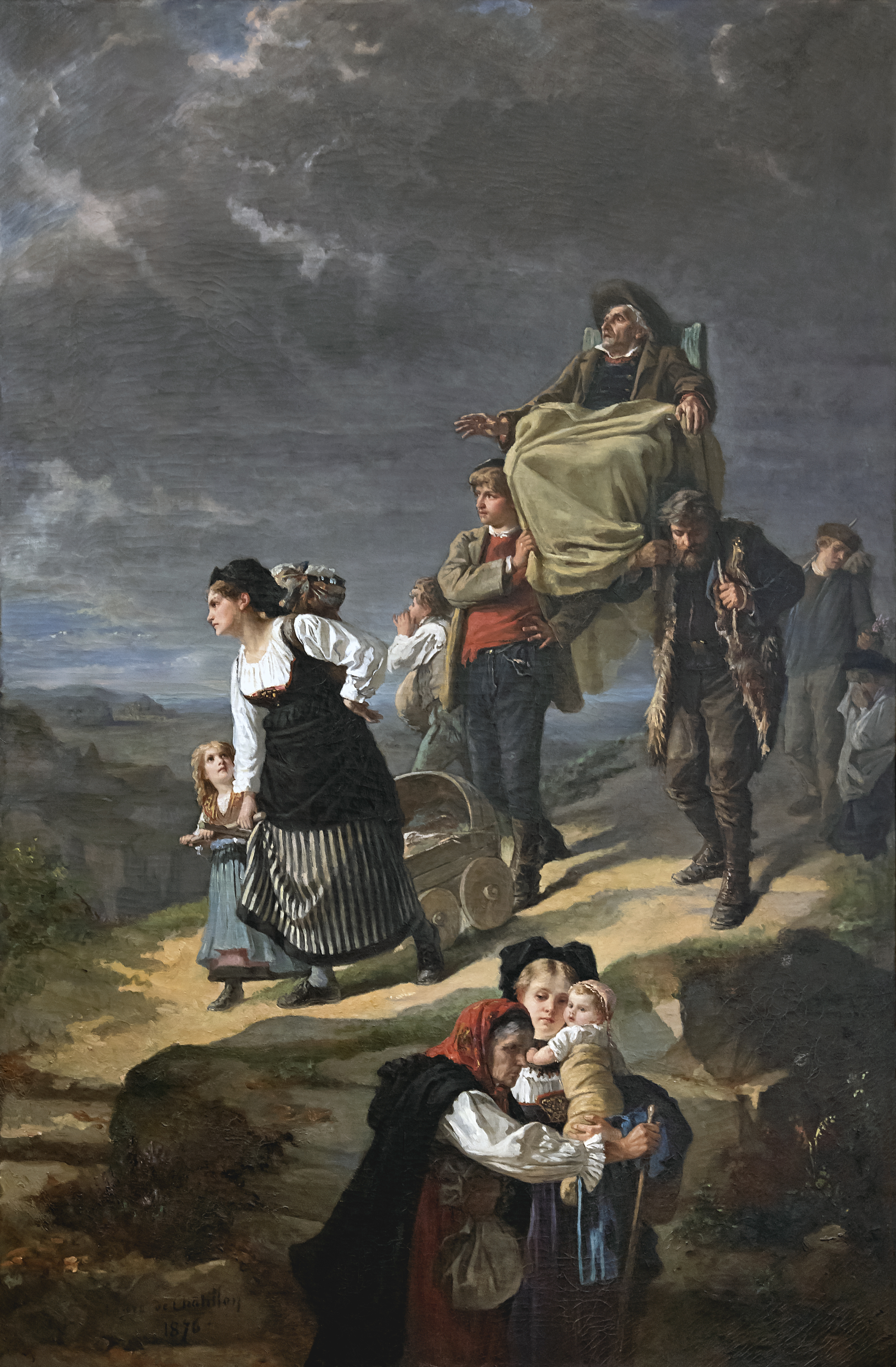
- The option Beaux-Arts de Carcassonne
- Born: 1826; Chambray
- Died: 1908 (aged 81–82); Clarens, Switzerland
- Occupation: Painter
- Spouse: Jules François Henri de Châtillon (m. 1850)

Zoé-Laure de Chatillon, née Delaune (1826–1908) was a French painter.

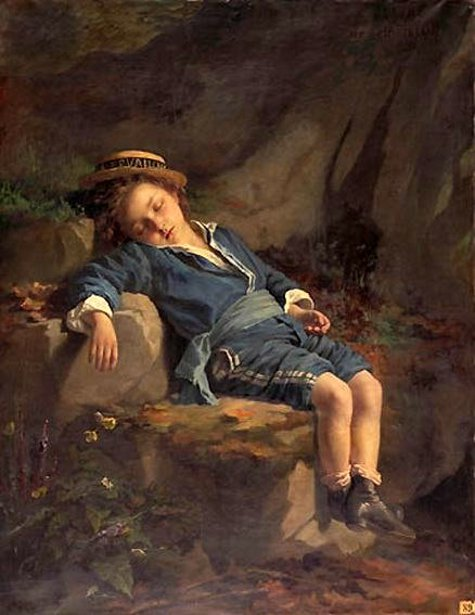
Sleeping Child

Chatillon was born in Chambray but moved to Paris, where she showed works at the Paris Salon during the years 1851–1887, and exposed at Giroux in Paris in 1856. She was a student of Léon Cogniet, and married Jules François Henri de Châtillon, subprefect of Châteaudun, the 8 April 1850.

She was possibly related to Auguste de Châtillon, a French painter who travelled to New Orleans, as several of her paintings have been identified as depicting people from New Orleans.

As a member of the French delegation of female artists, she exhibited paintings at the Woman's Building at the World's Columbian Exposition in 1893 in Chicago in the Woman's building.

Her painting Sleeping Child, shown at the Salon of 1878, was included in the 1905 book Women Painters of the World. Chatillon died in Clarens, Vaud.

She received a number of imperial orders, among them are the Jeanne D'arc vouant ses armes à la vierge (1869), currently in the custody of the Musée Antoine Vivenel of Compiègne, and stored in the Église Saint-Jacques de Compiègne

She was one of the first members of the Union of Women Painters and Sculptors founded in 1881 by Hélène Bertaux and frequently showed her works in their exhibition.

She is the mother of Louise de Châtillon, born in 1851, who seems to be connected to the artist Auguste de Châtillon, as she claims that she is his niece.
