= Alix Énault =

French painter

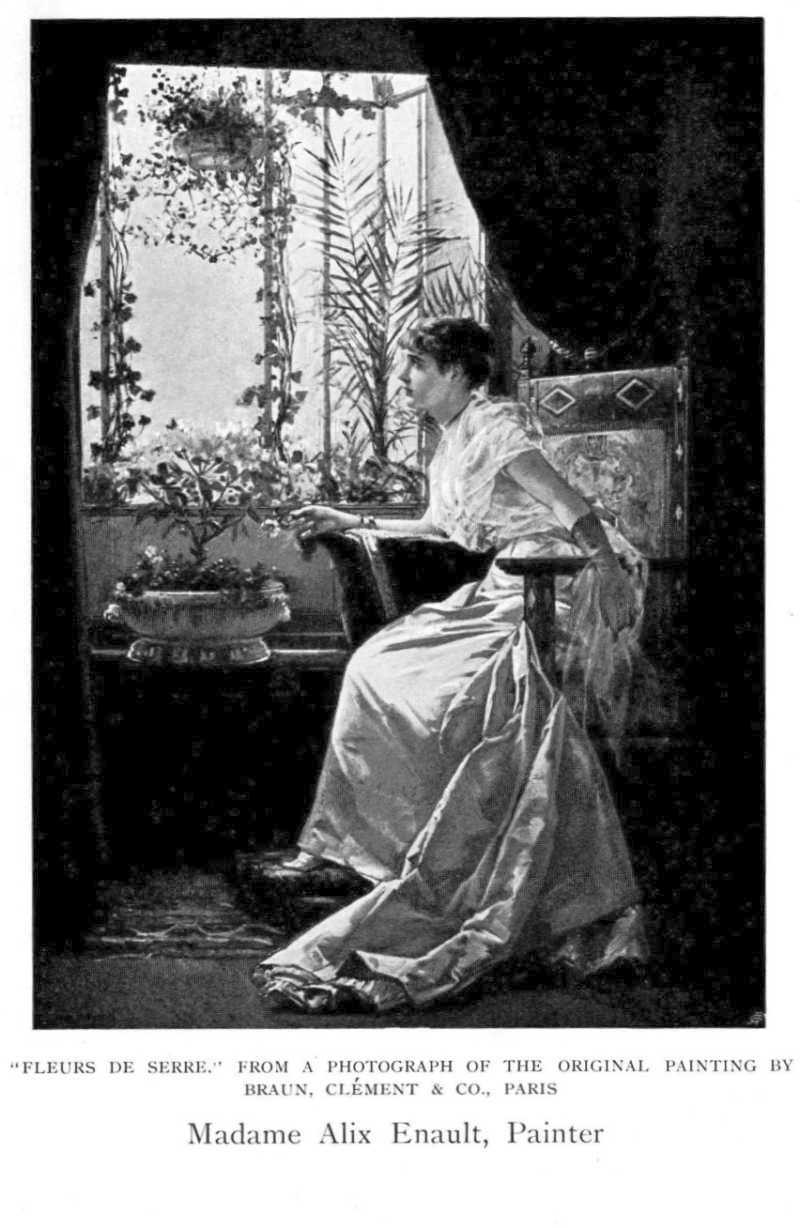
- Fleurs de Serre
- Born: 1848; Paris
- Died: 1909 (aged 60–61)

Alix Énault (1850–1913) was a French painter who exhibited her work in the Paris Salon 1882.

== Biography ==
Énault was born in Paris and married Louis Énault (1824–1900), a writer for the Paris Salon in the 1880s who mentioned her art. Her work Fleurs de Serre was included in his book Paris Salon 1882 and in the book Women Painters of the World.

She studied with A. Tissier and F. Willems and first exhibited at the Salon of 1876 with The Bride's Invocation. She was a member of the Salon des Artistes Français from 1885 and was awarded an honorable mention in 1887 and a bronze award in 1889.

She died in 1913 in Paris.
