= Fanny Holroyd =

Australian-British painter

- Born: 17 November 1863; Moonee Ponds
- Died: 17 April 1924 (aged 60); Syracuse, Sicily

Fanny Holroyd or Fannie Fetherstonhaugh Macpherson (1863 – 1924) was an Australian-British painter.

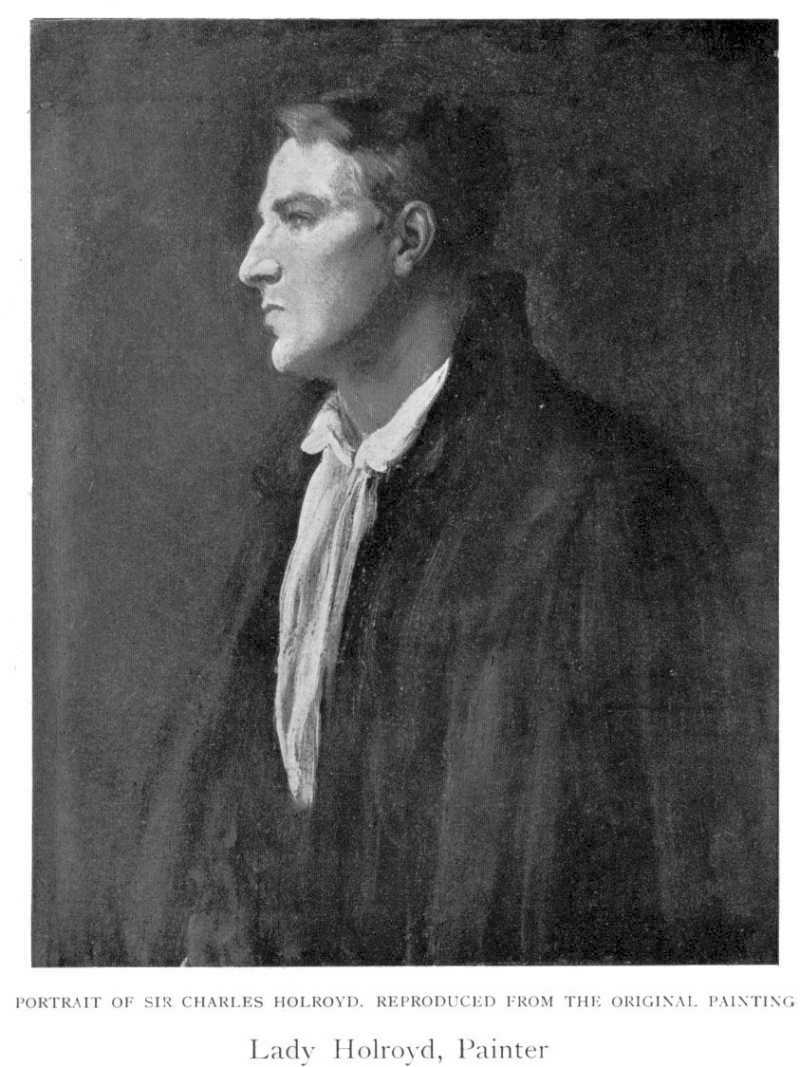
Portrait of Charles Holroyd by Lady Holroyd

Holroyd was born in Moonee Ponds as the daughter of the premier of Victoria John Alexander MacPherson. She studied art in London at the Slade school of art and met the painter Charles Holroyd in Rome. They married in 1891 and he became director of the Tate. Her husband was knighted in 1903 and in 1905 her portrait of her husband was included in the book Women Painters of the World.

Holroyd died in Syracuse, Sicily.
