= Lilian Cheviot =

English painter

- Born: 1876
- Died: 1936 (aged 59–60)

Lilian Cheviot (c. 1876 - 1936) was an English painter who flourished from 1894 to 1924.

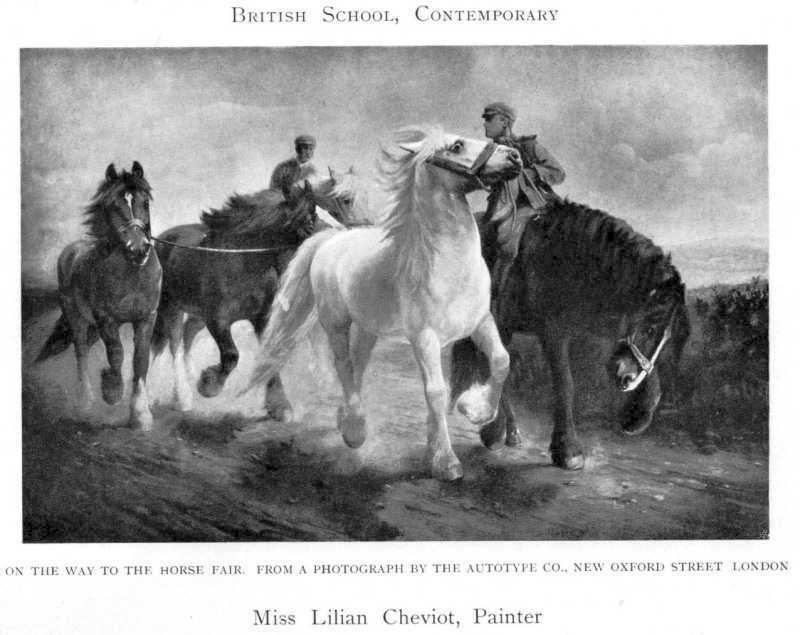
On the way to the Horse Fair

She lived in South Molesey in Surrey and exhibited at the Royal Academy in London in 1895 and 1899. She studied at Frank Calderon's School of Animal Painting and Walter Donne's Life School and exhibited at the Royal Academy of Arts in 1895 with the painting There's many a Slip and in 1899 with Kittens. Her work On the way to the Horse Fair was included in the 1905 book Women Painters of the World. In 1911 her illustrations were included in the book The new book of the dog.

She is known for animal paintings and made dog portraits.

Examples of dogs by Lilian Cheviot

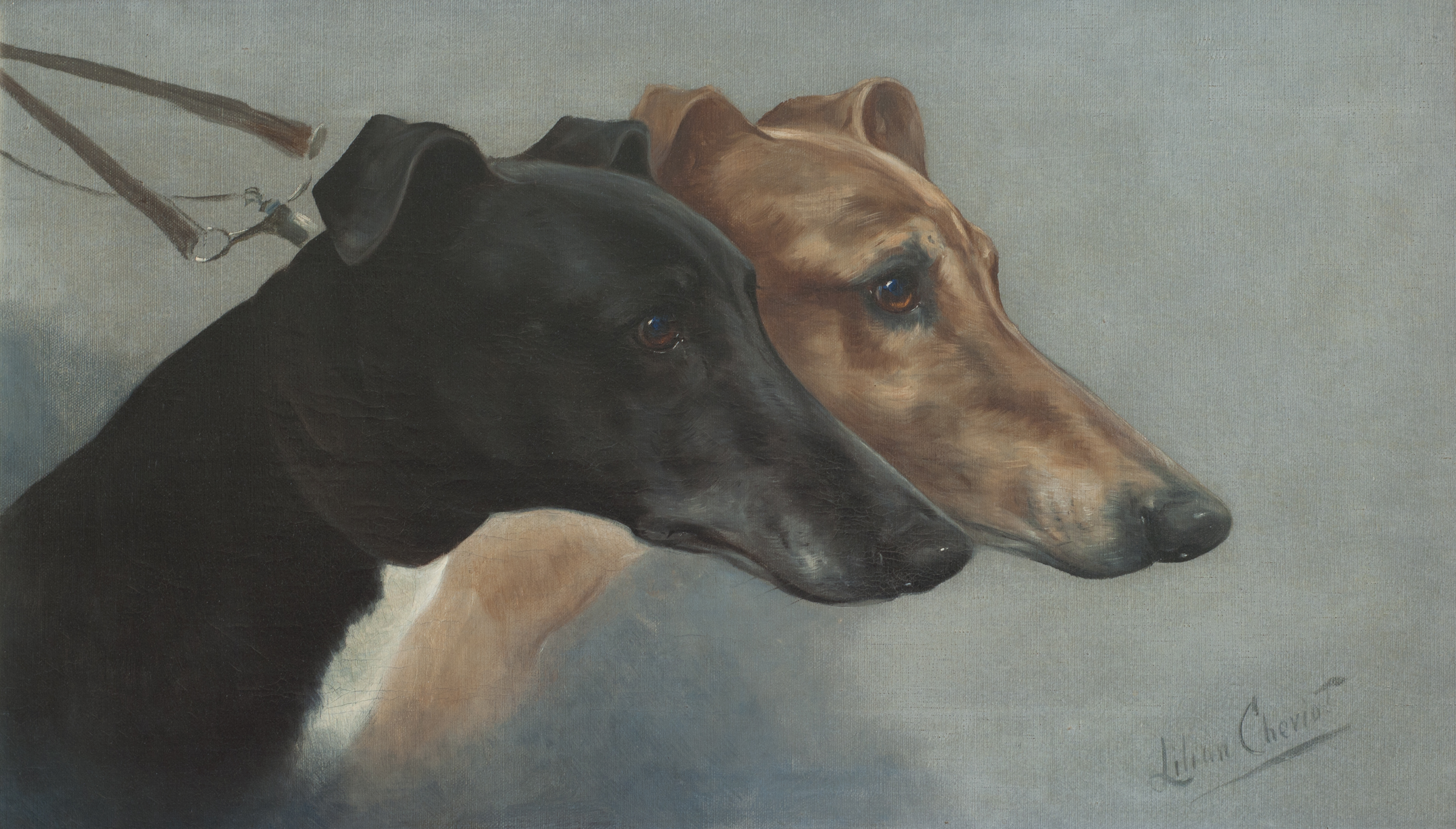
Dilwyn and Leucryx in the slips for the Waterloo Cup (1914)

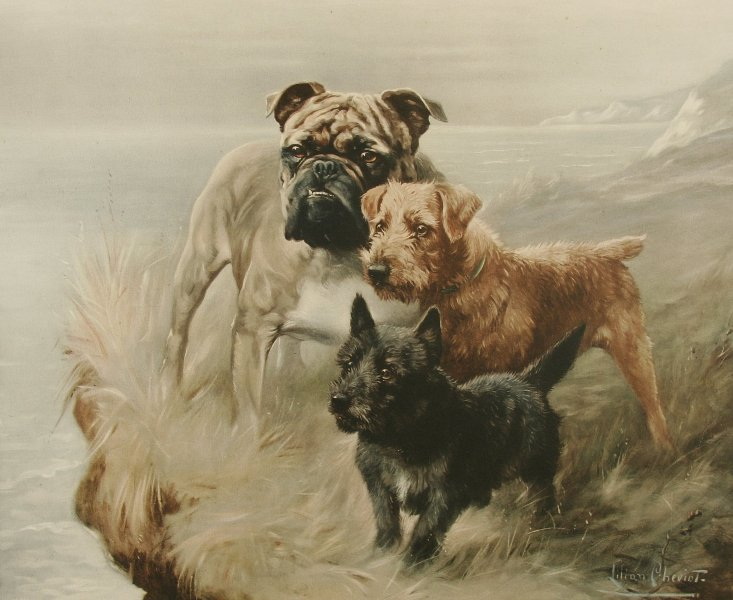
Come Over Here

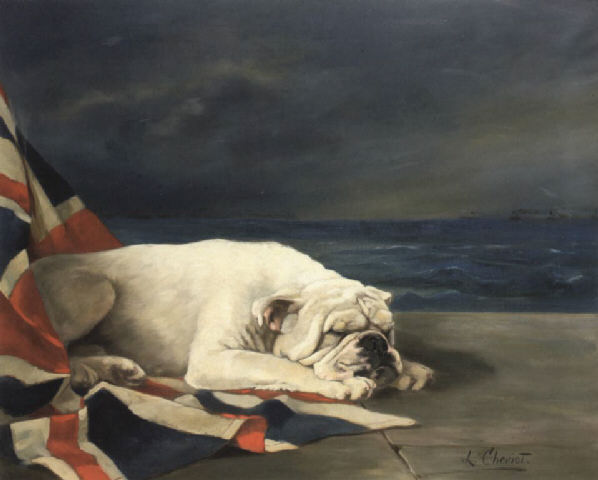
Wake Up England
