= Uranie Alphonsine Colin-Libour =

French painter

- Born: 19 September 1831; Paris
- Died: 1916 (aged 84–85)

Uranie Alphonsine Colin-Libour (19 September 1831 – 1916) was a French painter.

Colin-Libour was born in Paris and became a pupil of François Bonvin, Charles Louis Lucien Muller, and François Rude. She exhibited at Chicago World Exposition in 1893.

Her painting Charity was included in the 1905 book Women Painters of the World.

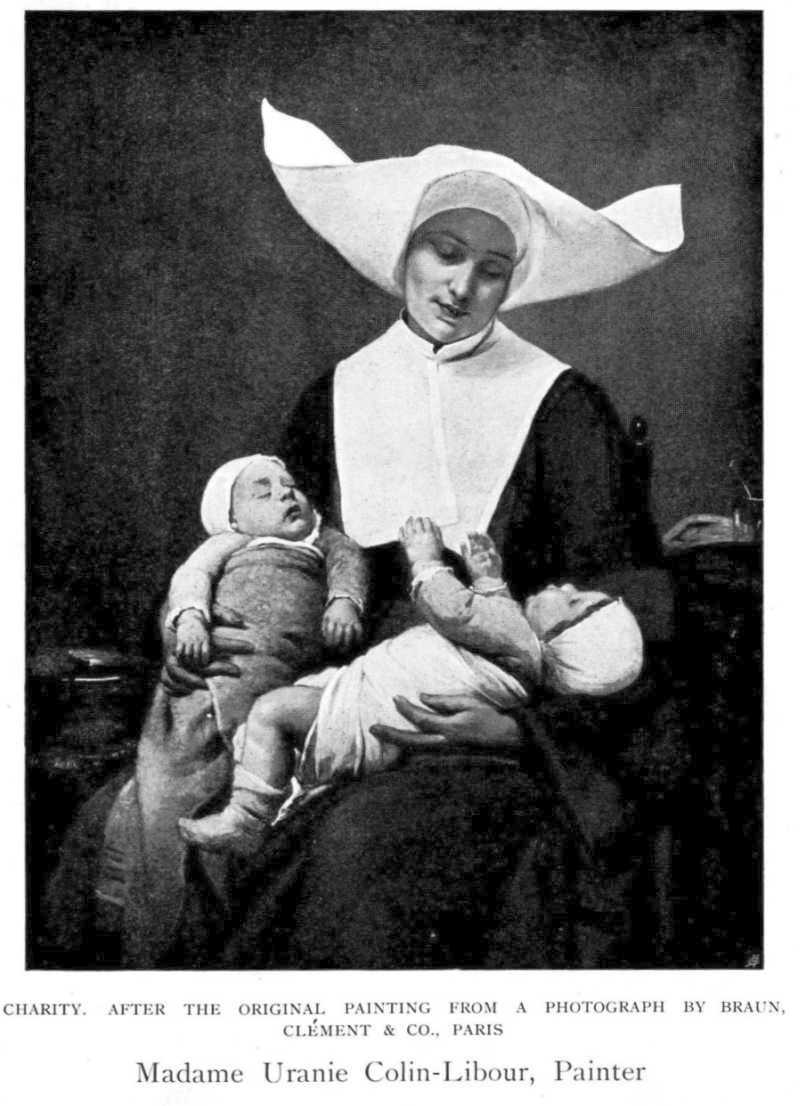
Charity
