= Annie Mary Youngman =

English painter

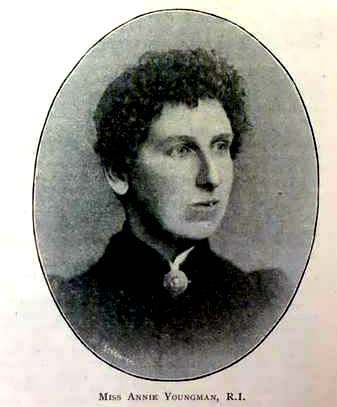
- Born: 25 February 1859; Saffron Walden, Essex, England
- Died: 10 January 1919 (aged 59); London, England
- Known for: Painting

Annie Mary Youngman (25 February 1859 – 10 January 1919) was a British painter.

== Biography ==
Youngman was born in Saffron Walden as the daughter of the painter-etcher John Mallows Youngman, who made etchings for a book called Sketches of Saffron Walden. Youngman exhibited her work at the Palace of Fine Arts at the 1893 World's Columbian Exposition in Chicago, Illinois.

Her paintings From a Neopolitan Villa and Who Loves a Garden Loves a Greenhouse too were included in the 1905 book Women Painters of the World. She was posthumously made a member of the Royal Institute of Painters in Water Colours in 1919.

== Gallery ==
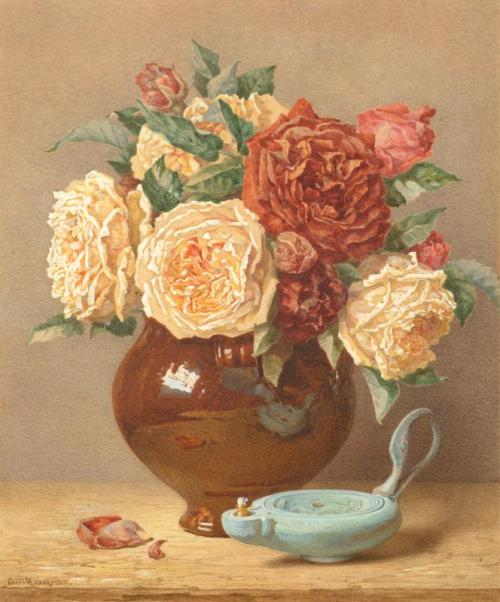
The Old and the New, Aberdeen Art Gallery

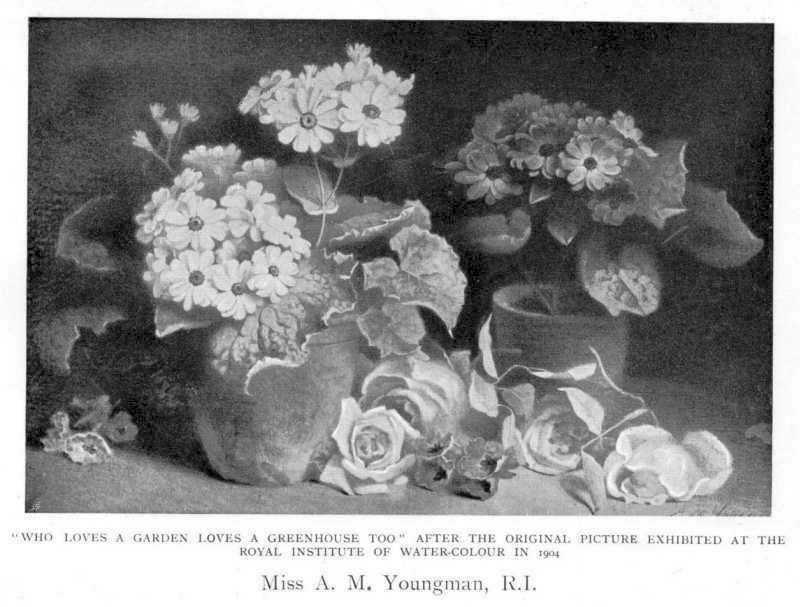
Who Loves a Garden Loves a Greenhouse too

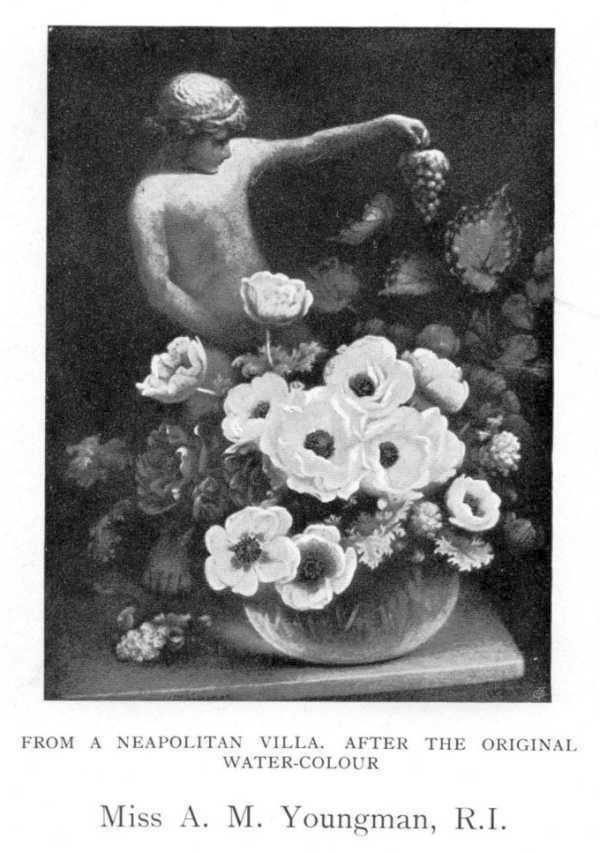
From a Neopolitan Villa
