= Blanche Jenkins =

British portrait painter

Blanche Jenkins R.A. (1852–1915) was a British portrait painter.

== Life ==
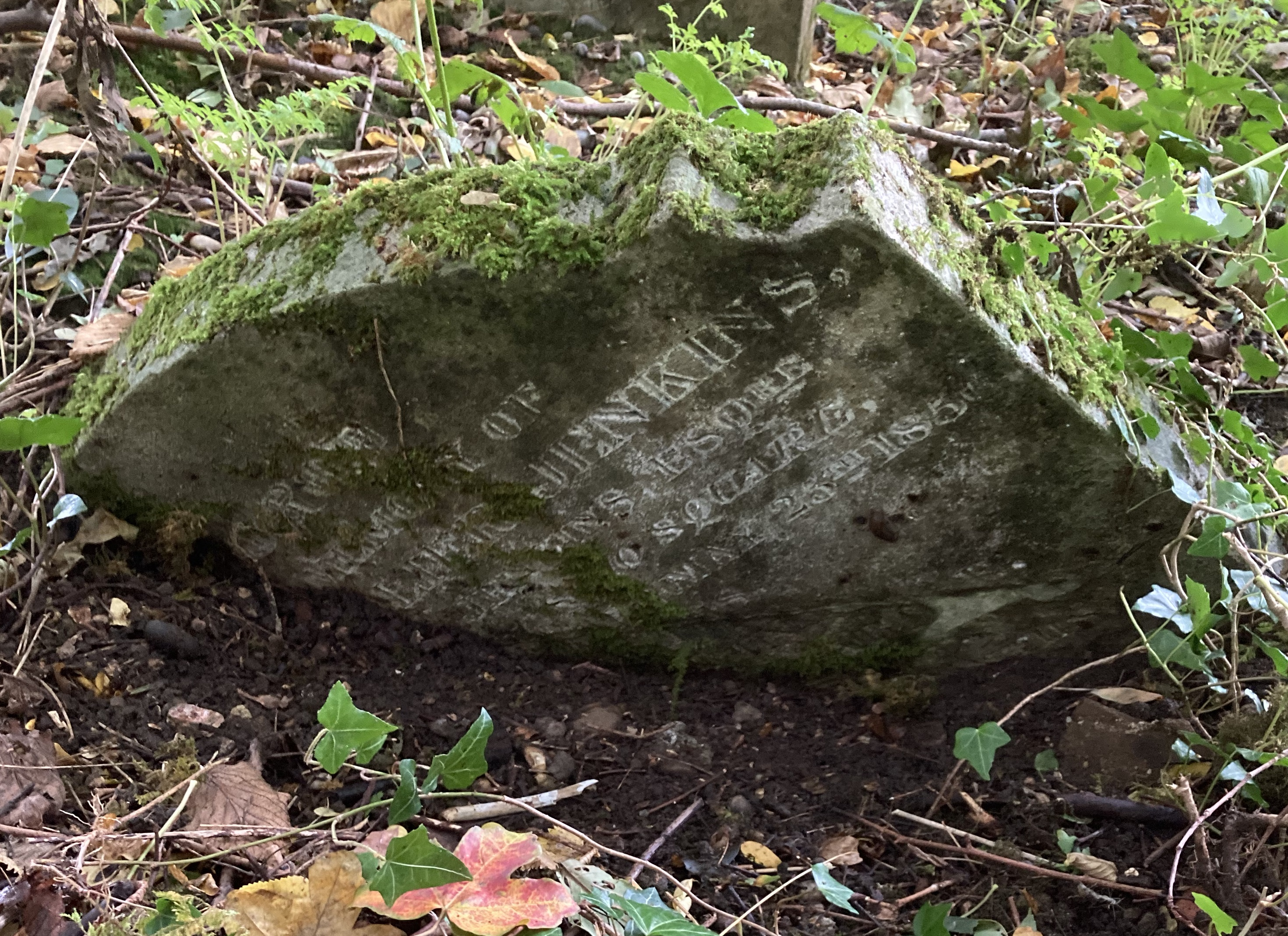
Grave of Blanche Jenkins in Highgate Cemetery

Jenkins was active as an exhibitor at the Society of British Artists and at the Royal Academy, where she showed some 49 works from 1872 onwards. Her works The Fairy Queen; Daisy, daughter of G.T.R. Preston, Esq; and A Little Coquette were exhibited at the Royal Academy in 1883.

She was also a member of the Society of Lady Artists, through which she exhibited numerous works and gained some acclaim. She also exhibited her work at the Woman's Building at the 1893 World's Columbian Exposition in Chicago, Illinois.

Her painting Her Morning Ride was included in the 1905 book Women Painters of the World.

She died in 1915 and was buried on the western side of Highgate Cemetery with her father George (d.1871) and her sister Emma (d.1904).

== Gallery ==
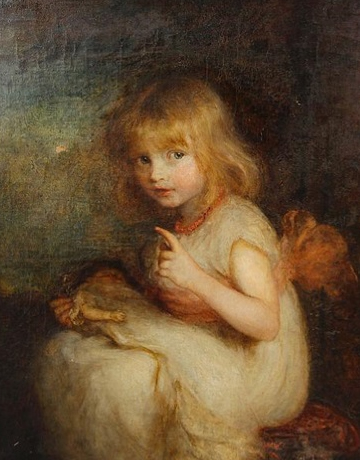
Portrait of a child

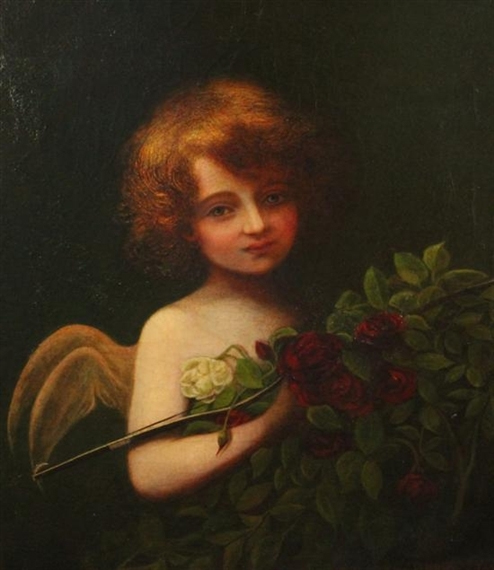
Cupid with roses

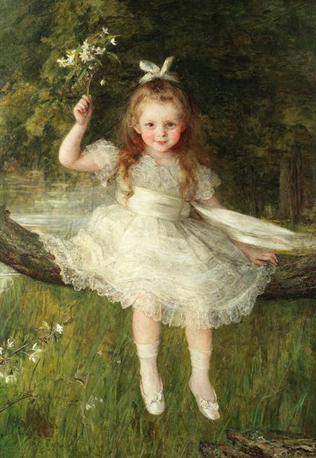
Miss Georgie
