= Amelia Hotham =

British watercolour painter

Amelia Hotham Woodcock
- Born: Amelia Hotham; 1776
- Died: 1812 (aged 35–36)
- Known for: Painting
- Spouse: John Woodcock (m. 1798)

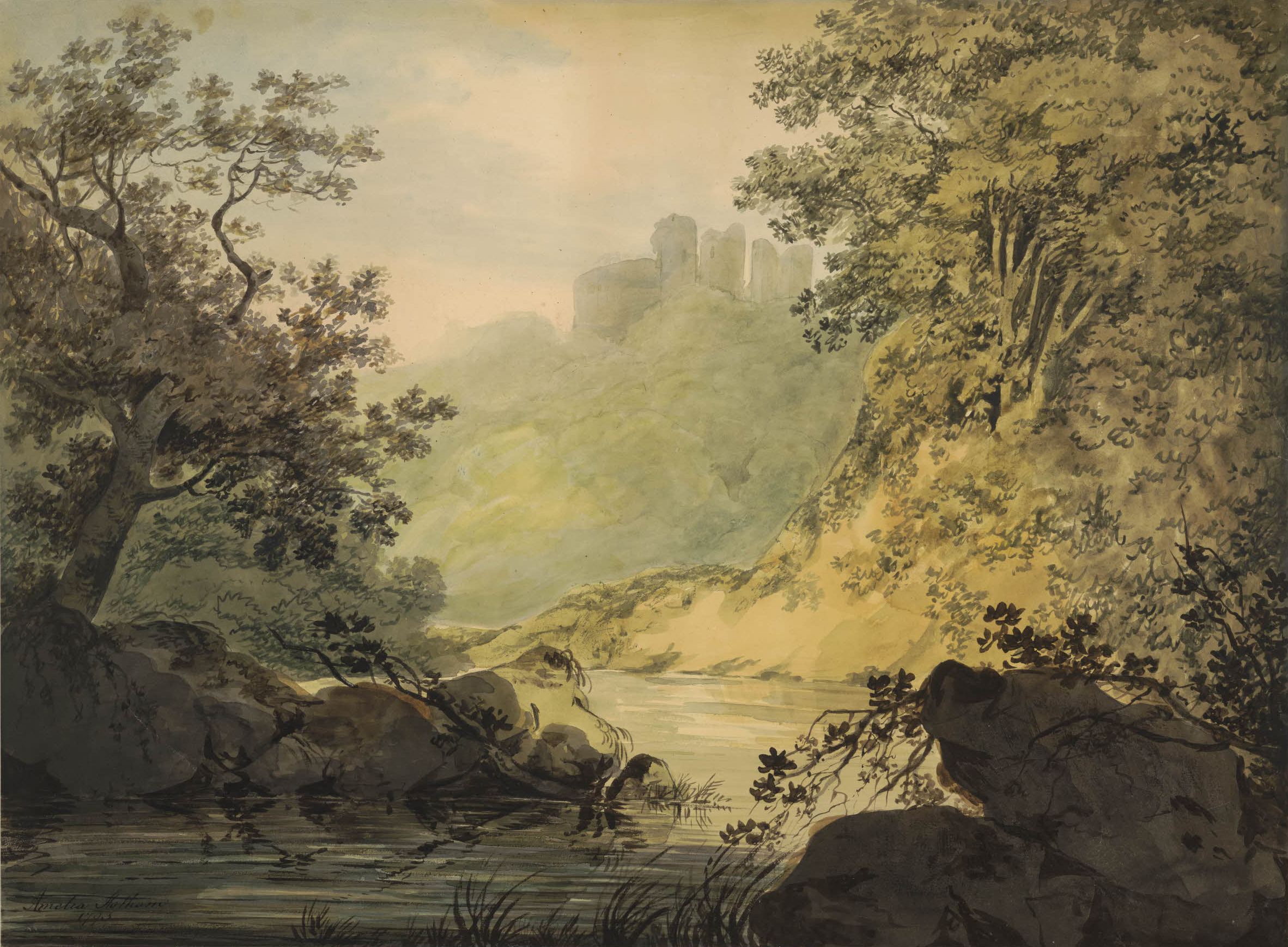
Riverside landscape with a castle in the distance, 1793

Amelia Hotham (c 1776 – 1812) was a British watercolour painter.

She was the daughter of Susannah Hankey and Beaumont, 2nd Lord Hotham. She married John Woodcock in 1798.

Her watercolour painting Riverside landscape with a castle in the distance, dated 1793, was included in the 1905 book Women Painters of the World.
