= Gertrude Macdonald =

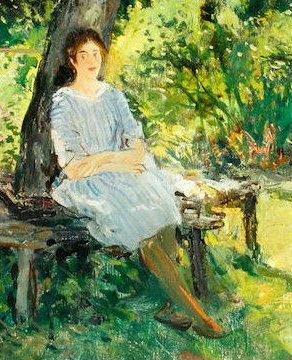
- Portrait of Biddy Macdonald under a tree by Alexander Jamieson, c.1907
- Born: 1871; England
- Died: 1952 (aged 80–81)
- Known for: Painting
- Spouse: Alexander Jamieson

Gertrude Macdonald or Biddy Jamieson (1871 – 1952) was an English painter.

Macdonald was born and trained in England but moved to Paris where she met and married her husband, the Scottish painter Alexander Jamieson. They married in 1907. Her work Portrait of the Lady Alix Egerton was included in the book Women Painters of the World.
