= Félicie Schneider =

French painter (1831–1888)

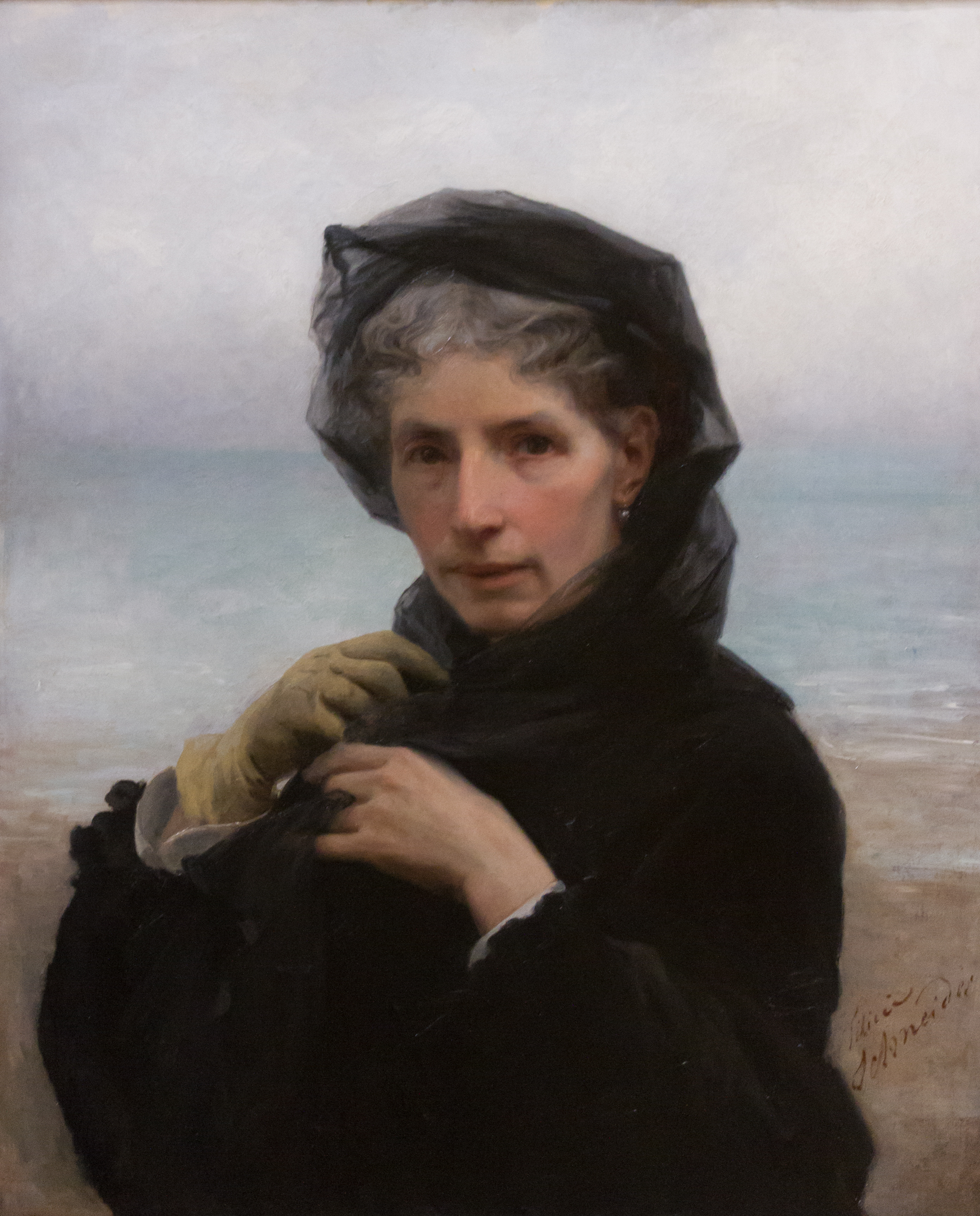
- Self portrait
- Born: 28 December 1831; Saint-Cloud
- Died: 1888 (aged 56–57)

Félicie Schneider or Felicie Fournier (1831 – 1888) was a French portrait painter.

Schneider was born in Saint-Cloud and first learned to paint from her father, Amable Nicolas Fournier, and later went to the school run by Leon Cogniet. She showed works at the Paris Salon from 1849. Her work The Last Survivors of a Family was included in the book Women Painters of the World.

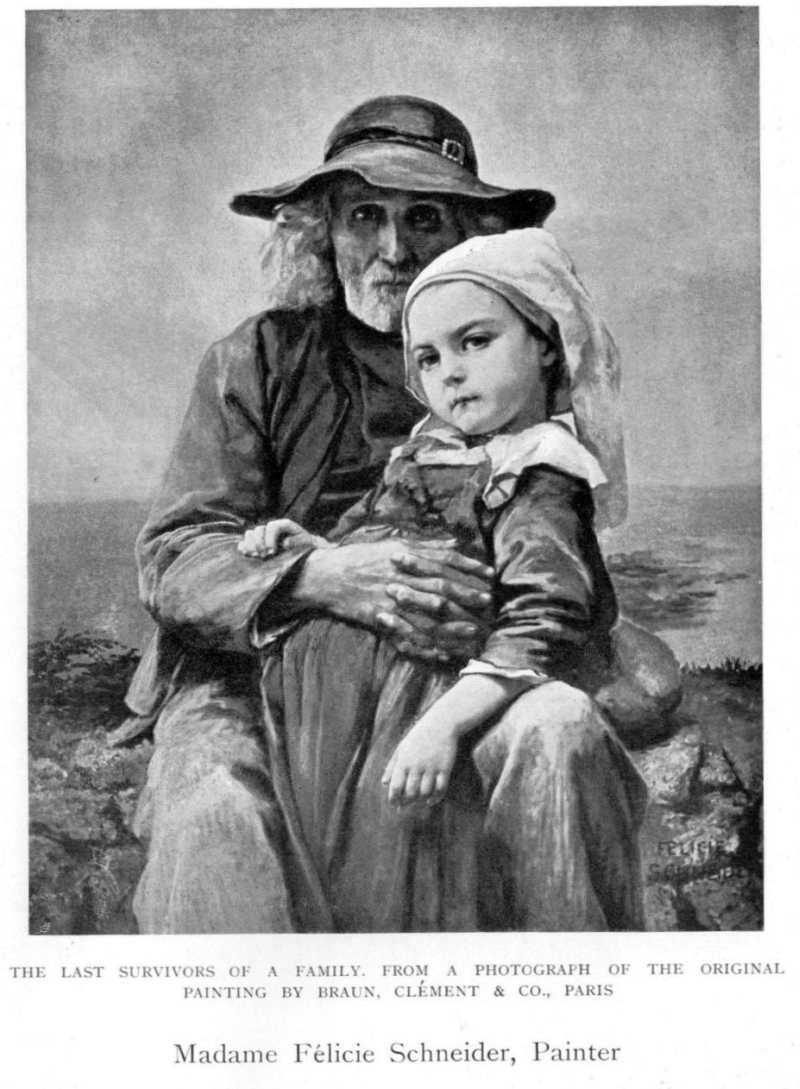
The Last Survivors of a Family

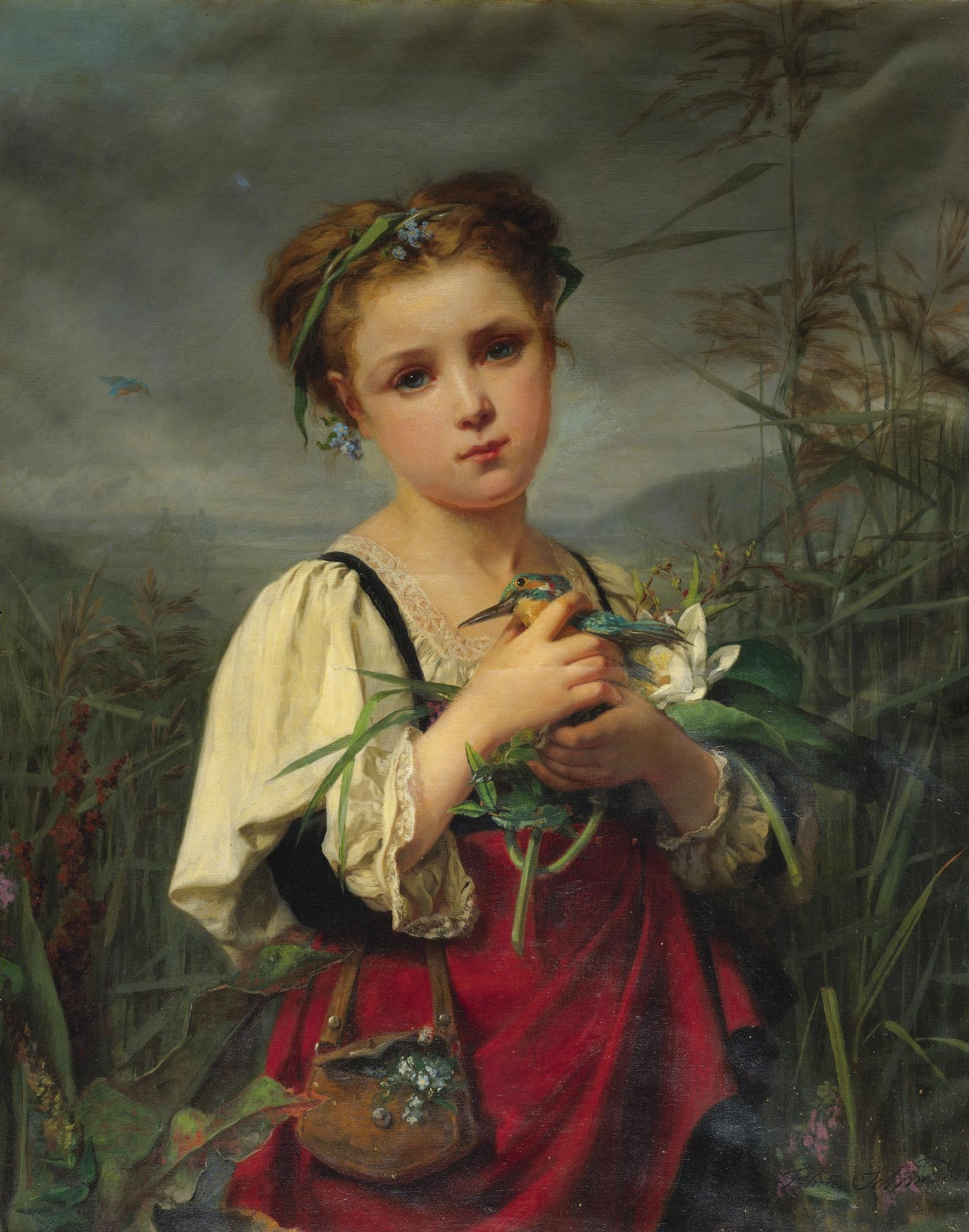
The Little Nurse
