= Francesca Stuart Sindici =

Spanish artist (1858–c. 1929)

- Born: 1858; Madrid
- Died: c. 1929; Rome

Francesca Stuart Sindici (1858 – c. 1929) was a Spanish-Italian painter.

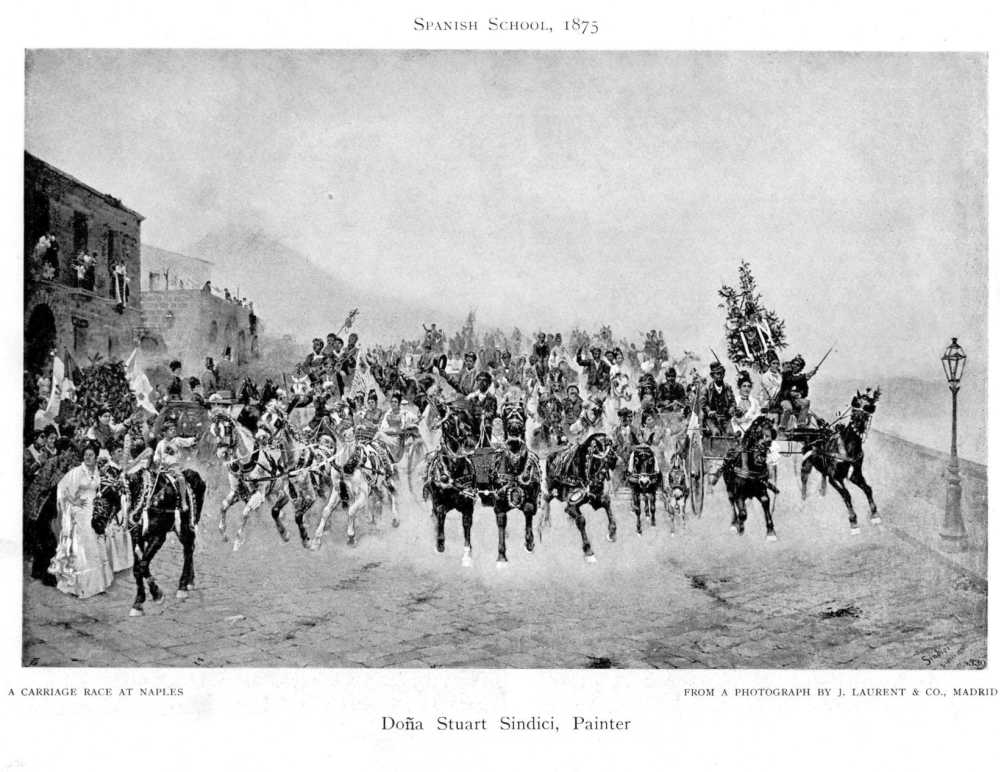
A Carriage Race at Naples

Sindici was born in Madrid, Spain, in 1858. She studied under the guidance of Eduardo Dalbono and Domenico Morelli at the Naples Academy of Fine Arts. She married the Italian poet Augusto Sindici. Together they had a daughter, Magda, who became a novelist and later married a publisher. She died in 1929 at the age of 71.

Sindici is best known for her paintings of horses and cavalry. Her painting A Carriage Race at Naples (Pictured) was included in the 1905 book Women Painters of the World.
