= Antonia Bañuelos =

Spanish artist (1856–1926)

Antonia de Bañuelos-Thorndike
- Born: 1856; Rome, Papal States
- Died: 1926 (aged 69–70)

Antonia de Bañuelos Thorndike (also known as Marquesa de Alcedo; 1856–1926) was a Spanish painter born in Rome, who spent most of her life in Paris.

She was the daughter of the Earl of Bañuelos and a disciple of Charles Joshua Chaplin. At the Paris Exposition of 1878, several portraits by this artist attracted attention, one of them being a portrait of herself.

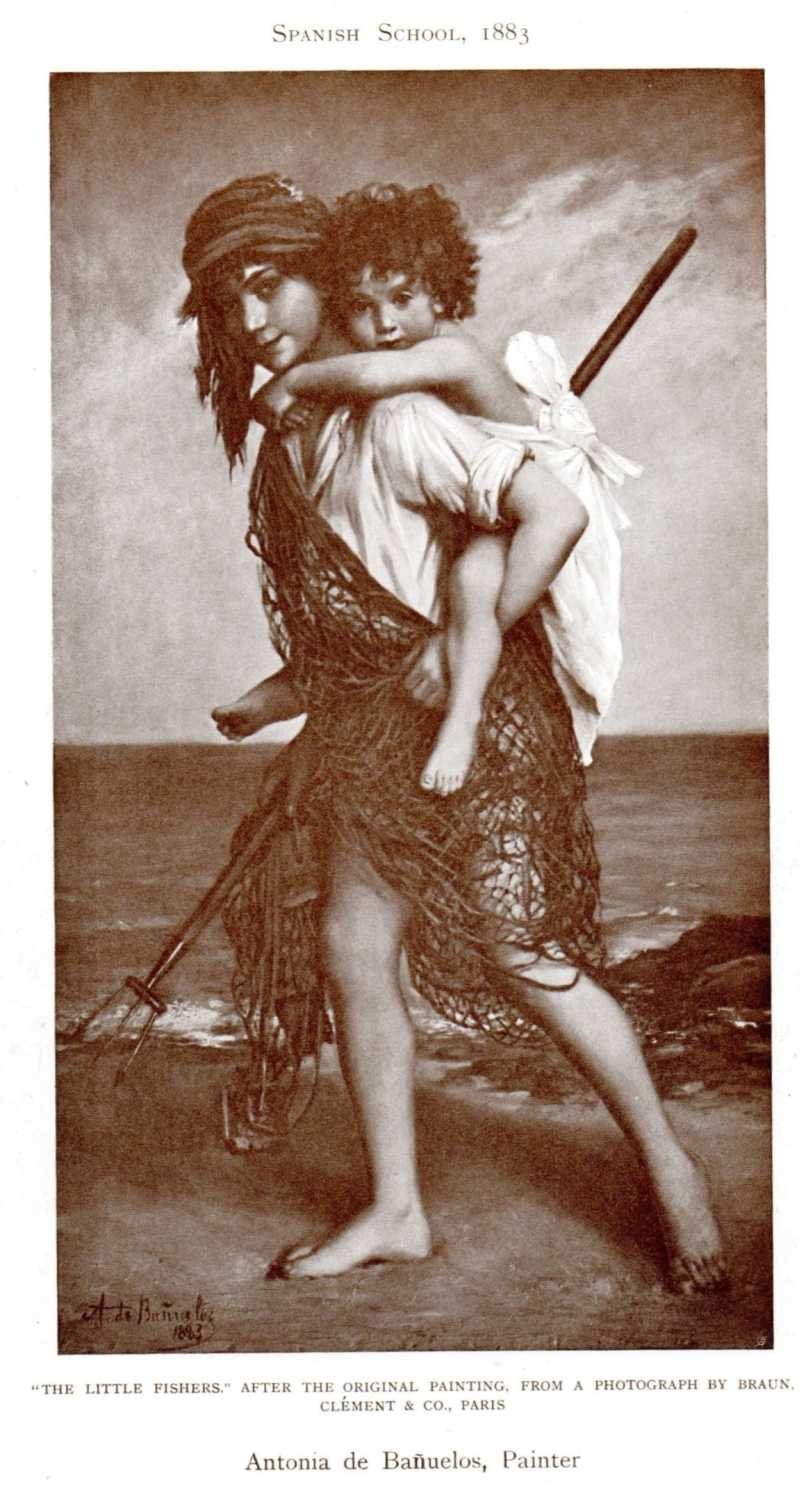
The Little Fishers

At the Exposition of 1880, she exhibited A Guitar Player. Her works The Little Fishers and Study of a laughing baby were included in the book Women Painters of the World.

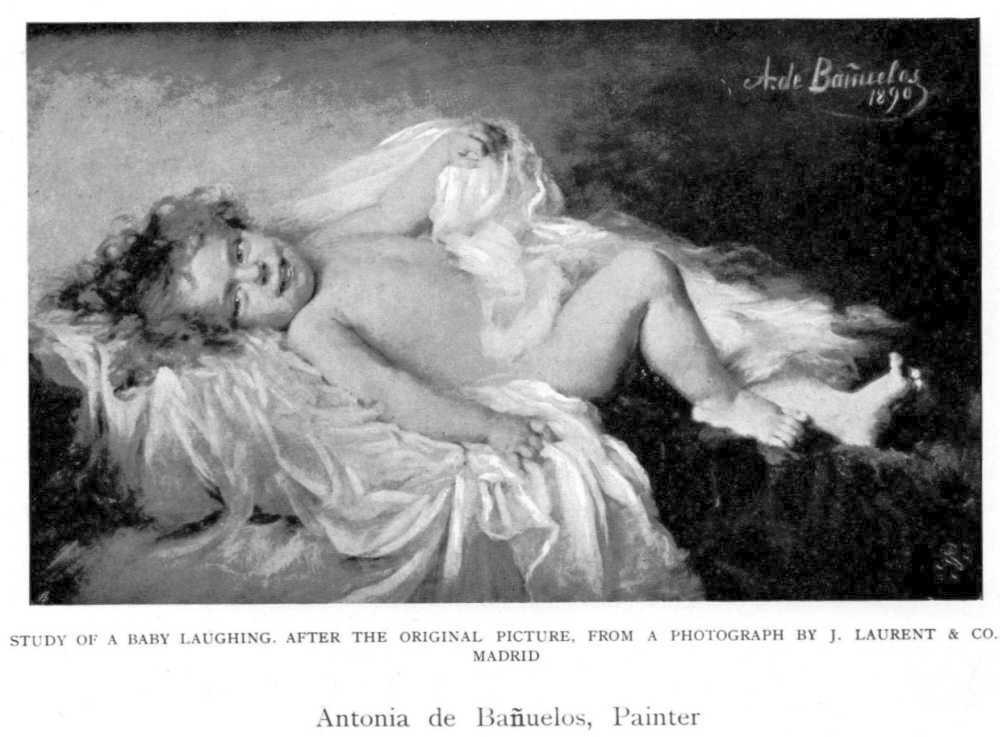
Study of a laughing baby
