= List of French women artists =

This is a list of women artists who were born in France or whose artworks are closely associated with that country.

== A ==
- Louise Abbéma (1853–1927), painter, sculptor, designer
- Georges Achille-Fould (1868–1951), painter
- Françoise Adnet (1924–2014), figurative painter
- Hélène Agofroy (born 1953), contemporary artist
- Georgette Agutte (1867–1922), painter
- Fanny Alaux (1797–1880), painter
- Lou Albert-Lasard (1885–1969), painter
- Yvette Alde (1911–1967), painter
- Jeanne Amen (1863–1923), painter.
- Beatrice Valentine Amrhein (born 1961), painter
- Anastasia (fl. c. 1400), manuscript illuminator
- Virginie Ancelot (1792–1875), painter, writer
- Hélène Marie Antigna (1837–1918), painter
- Lydie Arickx (born 1954), painter
- Yolande Ardissone (born 1927), painter
- Geneviève Asse (1923–2021), painter
- Virginie Augustin (born 1973), comics and animated features artist
- Pauline Auzou (1775–1835), painter

== B ==
- Anna Barbara Bansi (1777–1863), painter
- Jeanne Bardey (1872–1954), painter, sculptor
- Estelle de Barescut, painter and lithographer
- Nina Barka (1908–1986), Russian-born French painter
- Françoise Basseporte (1701–1780), painter
- Marie-Adélaïde Baubry-Vaillant (1829–after 1881), painter
- Amélie Beaury-Saurel (1849–1924), painter
- Hélène de Beauvoir (1910–2001), painter
- Gabrielle Bellocq (1920–1999), painter, artist in pastels
- Denise Bellon (1902–1999), photographer associated with Surrealism
- Marie-Guillemine Benoist (1768–1826), painter
- Marcelle Bergerol (1900–1989), painter
- Augusta Bernard (1886–1946), fashion designer
- Solange Bertrand (1913–2011), painter, sculptor, engraver
- Antoinette Béfort (1788–1868), history painter
- Adélaïde Binart (1769–1832), painter
- Ginette Bingguely-Lejeune (1895–1969), sculptor
- Lucienne Bisson (1880–1939), painter
- Marie Blancour (fl. 1650–1699), painter
- Cathryn Boch (born 1968), multi-media artist
- Jeanne Bonaparte (1861–1910), painter, sculptor
- Juliette Bonheur (1830–1891), painter
- Rosa Bonheur (1822–1899), painter
- Claire Bouilhac (born 1970), bande dessinée illustrator, scriptwriter, colorist
- Marie Bouliard (1763–1825), portrait painter
- Madeleine Boullogne (1646–1710), still life painter
- Louise Bourgeois (1911–2010), sculptor
- Antoinette Bouzonnet-Stella (1641–1676), engraver
- Claudine Bouzonnet-Stella (1636–1697), engraver
- Françoise Bouzonnet-Stella (1631–1691), engraver
- Marthe Boyer-Breton (1879–1926), painter
- Marie Bracquemond (1841–1916), painter
- Elisa Breton (1906–2000), artist, writer
- Geneviève Brossard de Beaulieu (fl. 1770–1815), painter
- Henriette Browne (1829–1901), orientalist painter
- Élise Bruyère (1776–1847), painter
- Marie-Abraham Rosalbin de Buncey (1833–1891), painter
- Berthe Burgkan (1855–1936), painter

== C ==
- Marcelle Cahn (1895–1981), painter
- Joséphine Calamatta (1817–1893), painter, engraver
- Blanche-Augustine Camus (1884–1968), painter
- Yvonne Canu (1921–2008), painter
- Marie-Gabrielle Capet (1761–1818), painter
- Henriette Cappelaere (fl. 1846–1859), painter
- Annie Cardin (born 1938), painter
- Madeleine Carpentier (1865–1940), painter
- Marguerite Jeanne Carpentier (1886–1965), painter, sculptor
- Renée Carpentier-Wintz (1913–2003), painter
- Béatrice Casadesus (born 1942), painter, educator
- Madeleine Caudel (1879–1962), landscape painter
- Madame Cavé (c. 1809–1883), painter, teacher
- Berthe Cazin (1872–1971), painter, potter, goldsmith
- Marie Cazin (1845–1924), painter, sculptor
- Camille Chantereine (1810–1847), painter
- Angelique Charbonée (c. 1740–after 1780), engraver
- Eugénie Charen (1786–1824), painter
- Émilie Charmy (1878–1974), avant-garde painter
- Constance Marie Charpentier (1767–1849), painter
- Zoé-Laure de Chatillon (1826–1908), painter
- Francine Charderon (1861–1928), portrait painter
- Jeanne-Elisabeth Chaudet (died 1832), painter
- Germaine Chaumel (1895–1982), illustrator
- Aimée Julie Cheron (1821–c. 1840), miniature painter
- Li Chevalier (born 1961), painter, installation artist
- Geneviève Claisse (1935–2018), abstract painter
- Marie Jeanne Clemens (1755–1791), French-Danish engraver, pastel artist
- Marie-Amélie Cogniet (1798–1869), painter
- Héloïse Colin (1819–1873), painter, fashion illustrator
- Uranie Alphonsine Colin-Libour (1833–1916), painter
- Jacqueline Comerre-Paton (1859–1955), painter
- Delphine Arnould de Cool-Fortin (1830–1921), painter, writer
- Louise Zoé Coste (1805–after 1861), painter
- Lucie Cousturier (1876–1925), painter, writer
- Laure Coutan-Montorgueil (1855–1915), sculptor
- Marie Courtois (c. 1655–1703), miniature painter
- Marguerite Crissay (1874–1945), painter, sculptor
- Béatrice Cussol (born 1970), artist, writer

== D ==
- Jeanne Bernard Dabos (1765–1842), miniature painter
- Augustine Dallemagne (1821–1875), miniature painter
- Rébecca Dautremer (born 1971), illustrator
- Hermine David (1886–1970), painter
- Césarine Davin-Mirvault (1773–1844), painter
- Marie-Victoire Davril (1755–1820), painter
- Elsa Dax (born 1972), painter
- Sophie Debon (1787–1848), porcelain painter
- Louise Desbordes (1848–1926), Symbolist painter
- Iphigénie Decaux-Milet-Moreau (1778–1862), flower painter
- Herminie Déhérain (1798–1839), painter
- Julie Delance-Feurgard (1859–1892), painter
- Sonia Delaunay (1885–1979), Ukrainian-born French painter
- Marguerite Delorme (1876–1946), painter
- Antoinette Louise Demarcy (1788–1859), miniature painter
- Virginie Demont-Breton (1859–1935), painter
- Claudie Titty Dimbeng (born 1968), Ivorian-born abstract painter
- Émilie Desjeux (1861–1957), painter
- Louise-Adéone Drölling (1797–1836), painter
- Angèle Dubos (1844–1916), painter
- Victoria Dubourg (1840–1926), flower painter
- Suzanne Duchamp-Crotti (1889–1963), painter
- Catherine Duchemin (1630–1698), flower and fruit painter
- Adélaïde Ducluzeau (1787–1849), porcelain painter
- Rose-Adélaïde Ducreux (1761–1802), painter, musician
- Clémentine-Hélène Dufau (1869–1937), painter
- Adélaïde Dufrénoy (1765–1825), poet, painter
- Natalia Dumitresco (1915–1997), Romanian-born French abstract painter
- Thérèse-Marthe-Françoise Dupré (1877–1920), realist painter
- Pierrette-Madeleine-Cécile Durand (1745–1831), painter

== E ==
- Diane Esmond (1910–1981), British-born French Post-Impressionist painter
- Hélène Elizaga (1896–1981), French Basque painter

== F ==
- Nina Fagnani (1856–1928), American-born French miniature painter
- Hélène Feillet (1812–1889), painter and lithographer
- Nathalie Ferlut (born 1968), comic book illustrator, scriptwriter, colorist
- Jeanne Fichel (1849–1906), painter
- Madeleine Fié-Fieux (1897–1995), painter
- Clara Filleul (1822–1878), painter and children's writer
- Rosalie Filleul (1752–1794), pastellist, painter
- Fanny Fleury (1848–1920), painter
- Marie-Anne-Julie Forestier (1782–1843), painter
- Brigitte Lovisa Fouché (born 1958), painter
- Pauline Fourès (1778–1869), painter, novelist
- Consuelo Fould (1862–1927), painter
- Marie-Anne Fragonard (1745–1823), miniature painter
- Sophie Fremiet (1797–1867), painter
- Charlotte Eustace Sophie de Fuligny-Damas (1741–1828), flower painter

== G ==
- Marie-Élisabeth Gabiou (1761–c. 1811), painter
- Beya Gille Gacha (born 1990), sculptor
- Daria Gamsaragan (1907–1986), Egyptian-born Armenian sculptor and novelist
- Annick Gendron (1939–2008), abstract painter
- Antoinette Gensoul-Desfonts (c. 1769–1824), sculptor
- Marguerite Gérard (1761–1837), painter, etcher
- Louise Germain (1874–1939), painter
- Françoise Gilot (1921–2023), painter, writer
- Marie-Suzanne Giroust (1734–1772), painter
- Paule Gobillard (1867–1946), painter
- Marie-Éléonore Godefroid (1778–1849), portrait painter
- Eva Gonzalès (1849–1883), Impressionist painter
- Adrienne Marie Louise Grandpierre-Deverzy (1798–1869), painter
- Anna-Geneviève Greuze (1762–1842), painter
- Henriette Gudin (1825–1892), marine painter
- Anne Guéret (1760–1805), painter
- Louise Catherine Guéret (1755–1851), painter
- Rosina Mantovani Gutti (1851–1943), painter
- Maximilienne Guyon (1868–1903), painter

== H ==
- Adélaïde Victoire Hall (1772–1844), Swedish-French painter
- Hortense Haudebourt-Lescot (1784–1845), genre painter
- Jeanne Hébuterne (1898–1920), painter
- Blanche Hennebutte-Feillet (1815–1886), lithographer
- Emma Herland (1856–1947), painter
- Louise Marie-Jeanne Hersent-Mauduit (1784–1862), painter
- I.J. Berthe Hess (1925–1996), painter
- Marie-Anne Horthemels (1682–1727), engraver
- Louise-Magdeleine Horthemels (1686–1767), engraver
- Marguerite J. A. Houdon (1771–1795), painter
- Joséphine Houssay (1840–1901), painter
- Marie Huet (born 1859), painter
- Julie Hugo (1797–1865), painter
- Marie-Cunégonde Huin (1767–1840), miniaturist
- Anne Marguerite Hyde de Neuville (1771–1849), painter

== I ==
- Camille Cornelie Isbert (1825–1911), painter
- Jeanne Itasse-Broquet (1867–1941), sculptor

== J ==
- Marguerite Jacquelin (1850s–1941), flower painter
- Nélie Jacquemart (1841–1912), painter, art collector
- Jeanne Jacquemin (1863–1938), painter
- Marie Jaffredo (born 1966), comics artist
- Marie Victoire Jaquotot (1772–1855), painter
- Marine Joatton (born 1972), contemporary artist

== K ==
- Bernadette Kanter (born 1950), sculptor
- Pauline Knip (née Pauline Rifer de Courcelles) (1781–1851), bird painter, illustrator

== L ==
- Élodie La Villette (1848–1917), painter
- Adélaïde Labille-Guiard (1749–1803), miniaturist and portrait painter
- Espérance Langlois (1805–1864), painter, printmaker
- Oriane Lassus (born 1987), cartoonist, illustrator
- Marie Laurencin (1883–1956), painter, printmaker
- Pauline Laurens (1850–1941), painter, printmaker
- Suzanne Laurens, sculptor
- Andrée Lavieille (1887–1960), painter
- Marie Adrien Lavieille (1852–1911), painter
- Marie Ernestine Lavieille (1852–1937), painter
- Marie-Élisabeth Laville-Leroux (1779–1826), painter
- Jeanne-Philiberte Ledoux (1767–1840), painter
- Silviane Léger (1935–2012), French sculptor
- Amélie Legrand of Saint-Aubin (1797–1878), painter
- Anne-Louise Le Jeuneux (died 1794), painter
- Madeleine Lemaire (1845–1928), painter
- Marie-Victoire Lemoine (1754–1820), painter
- Thérèse Lemoine-Lagron (1891–1949), painter
- Sonia Lewitska (1880–1937), Ukrainian-born painter, printmaker, working in France
- Sophie Lienard (1800–1875), portrait miniaturist
- Marianne Loir (1715–1769), portrait painter
- Madeleine Lommel (1923–1929), outsider artist
- Henriette Lorimier (1775–1854), portrait painter
- Séraphine Louis (1864–1942), painter
- Marie Lucas Robiquet (1858–1959), Orientalist painter

== M ==
- Dora Maar (1907–1997), photographer, poet, painter
- Sophie Mallebranche (born 1976), artist, textile designer
- Julie Manet (1878–1966), painter
- Maria Manton (1910–2003), painter
- Marie Antoinette Marcotte (1869–1929), painter
- Jacqueline Marval (1866–1932), painter
- Aude Massot (born 1983), comic book artist
- Lidiya Masterkova (1927–2008), Russian-born French painter
- Catherine Matausch (born 1960), French journalist and painter
- Marie-Alexandrine Mathieu (1838–1908), artist known for her etchings
- Caroline de Maupéou (1836–1915), painter
- Agnès Mauzé (c. 1713–1788), self-taught relief modeller
- Constance Mayer (1775–1821), painter
- Caroline Mesquita (born 1989), sculptor
- Victorine Meurent (1844–1927), painter
- Angélique Mezzara (1793–1868), painter
- Ksenia Milicevic (born 1942), painter, architect
- Miss Van (born 1973), graffiti artist
- Miss.Tic (born 1956), street wall artist, poet
- Louise Moillon (1610–1696), Baroque painter
- Blanche Hoschedé Monet (1865–1947), painter
- Angélique Mongez (1775–1855), painter
- Émilie-Sophie de Montullé (1756–1816), painter
- Mirka Mora (1928–2018), French-born Australian visual artist
- Blanche Moria (1858–1927), sculptor
- Eulalie Morin (1765–1837), portrait painter
- Berthe Morisot (1841–1895), Impressionist painter
- Tania Mouraud (born 1942), contemporary artist
- Euphémie Muraton (1840–1914), painter

== N ==
- Afi Nayo (born 1969), painter
- Aurélie Nemours (1910–2005), abstract painter
- Marie Nicolas (1845–1903), painter
- Anne Baptiste Nivelon (c. 1711–1786), portrait painter
- Marie-Thérèse de Noireterre (1760–1823), miniaturist

== O ==
- Princess Marie of Orléans (1813–1839), sculptor, designer

== P ==
- Marie Parrocel (1743–1824), painter
- Gabrielle-Charlotte Patin (1666–1751), numismatist, writer, painter
- Odette Pauvert (1903–1966), painter
- Blanche Paymal-Amouroux (1860–1910), painter
- Catherine Perrot (1655–1695), miniature painter
- Marie Petiet (1854–1893), painter
- Laure Pigeon (1882–1965), Spiritualist artist
- Alice Prin (1901–1953), painter, writer

== Q ==
- Anna Quinquaud (1890–1984), explorer and sculptor

== R ==
- Alice Rahon (1904–1987), French-Mexican Surrealist artist, poet
- Marie Raymond (1908–1988), abstract painter
- Marie Magdeleine Real del Sarte (1853–1927), painter
- Marie-Thérèse Reboul (1728–1805), still life painter
- Sandrine Revel (born 1969), comics illustrator and author
- Hortense Richard (1860–1939/1940), painter
- Adèle Riché (1791–1878), painter
- Jeanne Rij-Rousseau (1870–1956), Cubist painter
- Cendrine Robelin (born 1983), contemporary artist
- Juliette Roche (1884–1980), Cubist painter
- Michèle Van de Roer (born 1956), Dutch-born painter, photographer, engraver
- Adèle Romany (1769–1846), miniature painter
- Jeanne Rongier (1852–1929), painter
- Charlotte de Rothschild (1825–1899), socialite, painter
- Jeanne Royannez (1855–1932), sculptor

== S ==
- Apollonie Sabatier (1822–1890), courtesan, salon holder
- Niki de Saint Phalle (1930–2002), sculptor, painter, filmmaker
- Eugénie Salanson (1836–1912), painter
- Louise-Joséphine Sarazin de Belmont (1790–1871), painter, lithographer
- Johanna Schipper (born 1967), comics artist
- Félicie Schneider (1831–1888), portrait painter
- Marie-Ernestine Serret (1812–1884), painter, pastellist
- Marguerite Sirvins (1890–1957), outsider textile artist
- Élisabeth Sonrel (1874–1953), painter, illustrator
- Audrey Spiry (born 1983), animator, illustrator, and bande dessinée author
- Anne Strésor (1651–1713), painter, nun
- Élisabeth Swagers (c. 1775–1837), painter

== T ==
- Élisabeth-Claire Tardieu (1731–1773), engraver
- Béatrice Tillier (born 1972), illustrator, cartoonist
- Henriette Tirman (1875–1952), painter, printmaker
- Kathy Toma (born 1944), painter, installation artist
- Sophie de Tott (1758–1848), painter

== V ==
- Suzanne Valadon (1865–1938), painter
- Frédérique Vallet-Bisson (1862–1949), painter
- Anne Vallayer-Coster (1744–1818), painter
- Caroline de Valory (born 1790), painter, engraver
- Adèle Varillat (1769–1861), portraitist, genre painter
- Angélique-Louise Verrier (1762–1805), painter
- Marie-Nicole Vestier (1767–1846), painter
- Maria Helena Vieira da Silva (1908–1992), Portuguese-French abstract painter
- Élisabeth Vigée Le Brun (1755–1842), painter
- Marie-Denise Villers (1774–1821), portrait painter
- Élodie La Villette, (1848–1917), landscape painter
- Henriette Vincent (1786–1834), botanical painter
- Stéphanie de Virieu (1785–1873), painter, sculptor

== W ==
- Hermine Waterneau (1862–1916), painter
- Emilie Jenny Weyl (1855–1934), sculptor
- Sabine Weiss (1924–2021), photographer

== Z ==
- Jenny Zillhardt (1857–1939), painter
