= Wintz =

Wintz is a surname. Notable people with the surname include:

- Paul Wintz (born 1986), Guyanese cricketer
- Raymond Wintz (1884–1956), French painter
- Renée Carpentier-Wintz (1913–2003), French painter
- Sophia Wintz (1847–1929), Swiss-born British philanthropist

== See also ==
- Wentz
