= Nayo (name) =

Nayo is both a given name and a surname. Notable people with the name include:

- Nayo Raincock-Ekunwe (born 1991), Canadian basketball player
- Nayo Wallace, American actress
- Afi Nayo (born 1969), French artist
- Alice Nayo (born 1993), French basketball player
- Christopher Kwaku Nayo (1926–2003), Ghanaian politician
- N. Z. Nayo (1922–1993), Ghanaian academic
- Gaëlle Nayo-Ketchanke (born 1988), French weightlifter
