= Dallemagne =

Dallemagne is a surname. Notable people with the surname include:

- Augustine Dallemagne (1821–1875), French miniature painter
- Claude Dallemagne (1754–1813), French commander during the Napoleonic Wars
- Georges Dallemagne (born 1958), Belgian politician and doctor
- Marcel Dallemagne (born 1898), French professional golfer
- Aimé Dallemagne (1882–1971), French painter
