= Pascal Paoli Museum =

Birthplace of Pasquale Paoli

Birthplace Museum of Pascal Paoli
- Casa Nativa di Pasquale Paoli (Corsican)
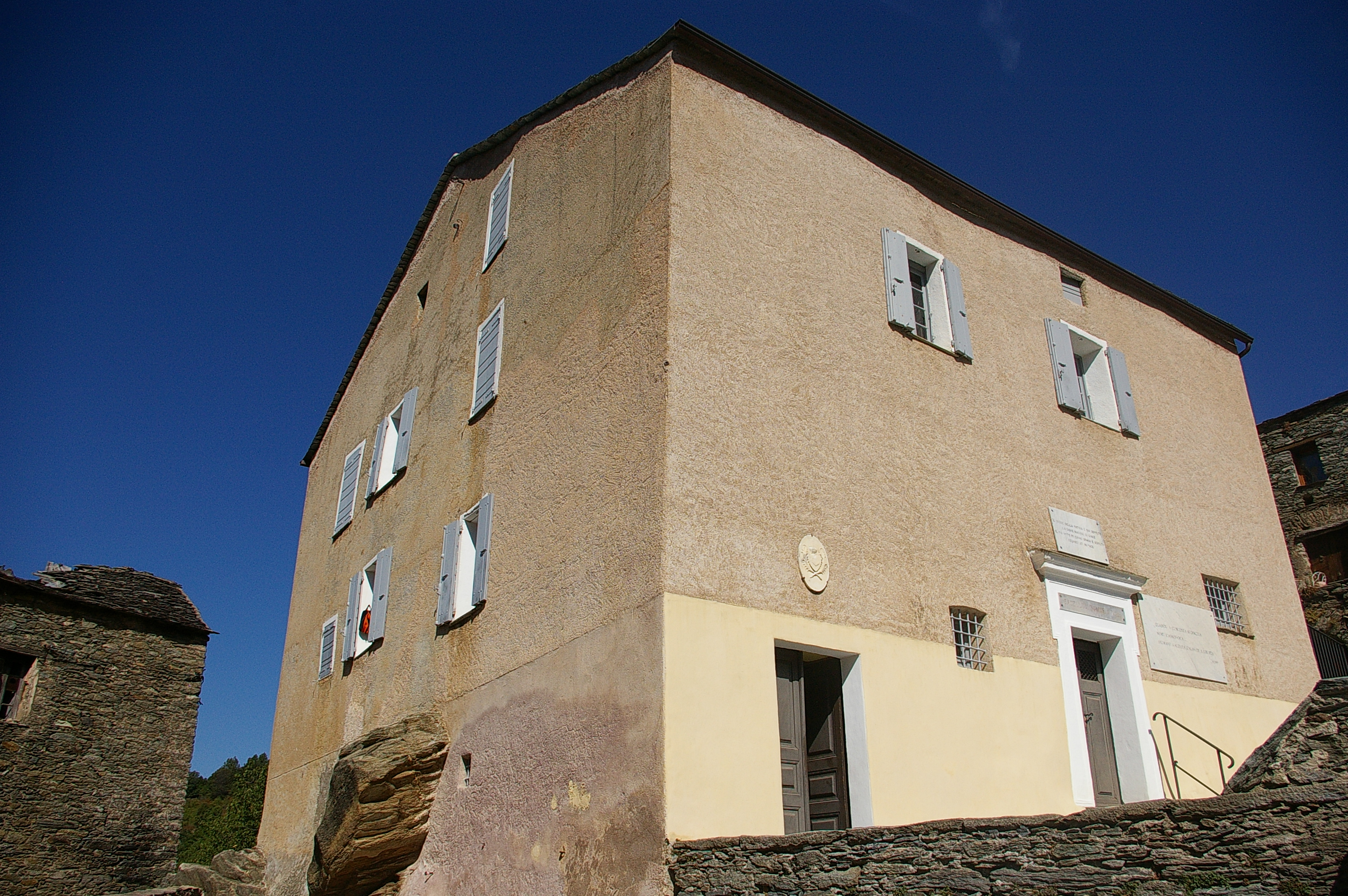
- Birthplace House of Paoli

- Location within Corsica
- 42.4361111111°N 9.30027777778°E
- Location: Hamlet of Stretta, Morosaglia

Monument historique
- Official name: Obélisque antique
- Designated: 1975

The Birthplace Museum Of Pasqualel Paoli (Casa Nativa Di Pasquale Paoli) is a museum dedicated to Pasquale Paoli, located in Haute-Corse, in the village of Morosaglia (Merusaglia in the Corsican language), in the hamlet of Stretta, Corsica, France.

== History ==
The birthplace of Pascal Paoli was ceded in 1888 to the department of Corsica by Jean-Baptist Franceschini Pietri (1834–1915), descendant of Maria Chiara Paoli, sister of Pascal Paoli, and private secretary of Napoleon III. The donation was accompanied by the condition that the oratory of the house receive the ashes of the general and that the floor be transformed into a museum. The translation of the ashes from the cemetery of the Catholic church of Saint Pancrace in London took place on September 7, 1889, but the museum was not really opened until 1954.

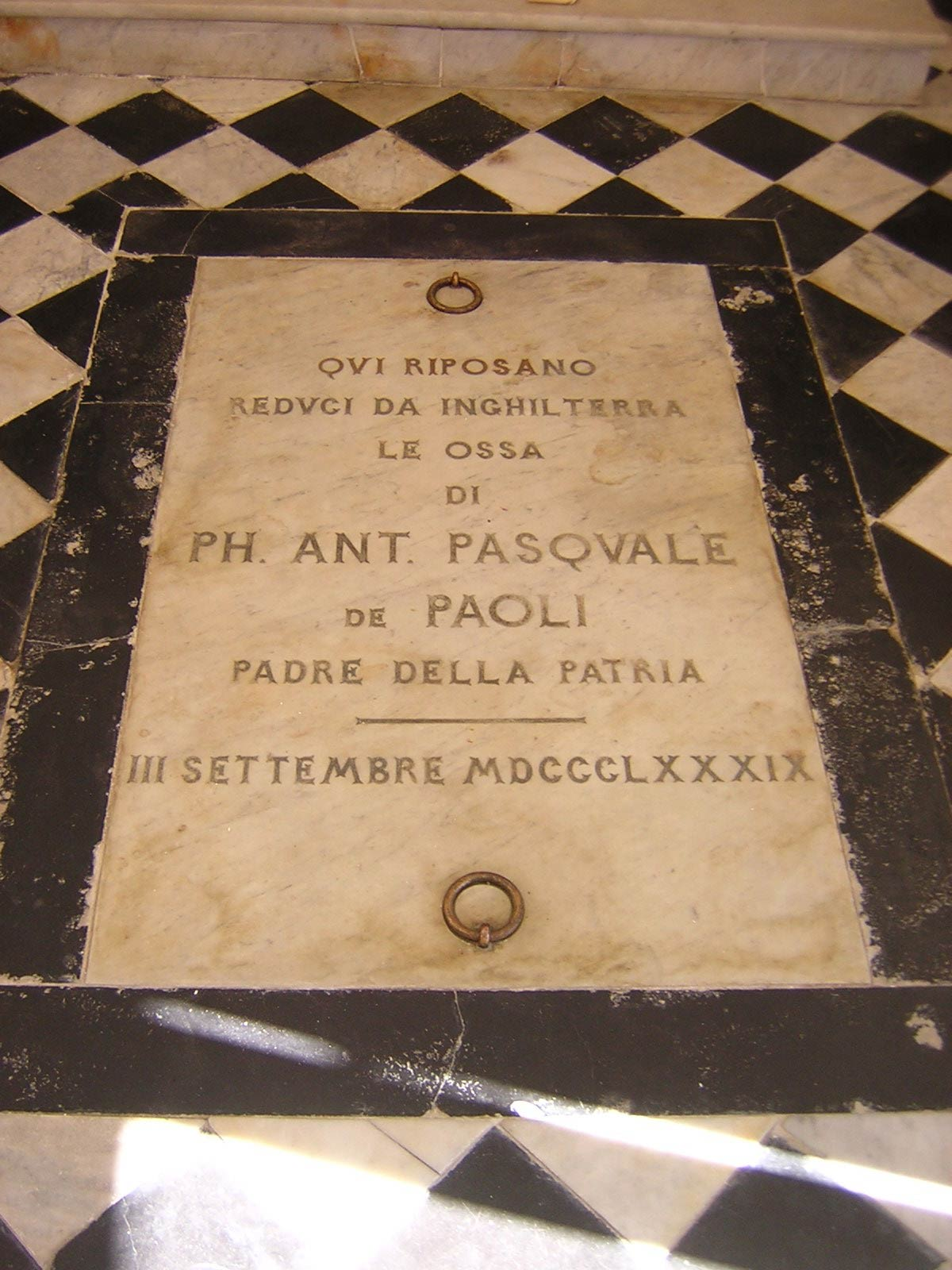
Tomb of Pasquale Paoli at his birthplace

=== History of the museum ===
In 1954, the museum was opened to the public thanks to the action of Jean Leblanc, departmental inspector of museums and curator of the Fesch Museum of Ajaccio.

The building was listed as a historical monument on April 28, 1975.

In 1976, with the bi-departmentalization, the house became the property of the department of Haute-Corse. Its state of degradation led the general council to restore and reorganize the museum's rooms between 1986 and 1991.

The title "Maison des Illustres" was awarded to the museum in 2012.

Under the NOTRe law, the museum has been integrated since January 1, 2018, into the Directorate of Heritage of the Collectivity of Corsica, which manages several heritage establishments of various natures, including five museums labeled Musée de France.

== Architecture ==
The building retains the traditional appearance of an 18th century house. It has a square floor plan, with two floors and an attic. It is covered with lauzes and includes rubble masonry.

== Fittings ==
Housed in Paoli's birthplace, the museum showcases the life and work of the character, including furniture, objects, and memories of the general and his government.

The objects and memories of General Paoli were originally quite few in number because, twice, in 1769 and 1796, knowing that his property was going to be put in receivership, Pascal Paoli had asked his intimates to shelter those to whom he held the most, which had the consequence of promoting their dispersion. At the end of his life, he donated to his fellow exiles everything they had taken, but he wished that the sword of honor offered by King Frederick II, the saddle offered by the Bey of Tunis, and various documents be deposited in the brotherhood of the village.

The museum's collections have gradually been enriched thanks to some donations and the acquisition policy conducted by the General Council and the Collectivity of Corsica. It allowed the museum to acquire the bust of Paoli made by John Flaxman, the foot portrait painted by Benbridge, or a pair of pistols made in 1773 in London by John Fox Twigg. The portrait was commissioned by the Scottish James Boswell, a grand admirer and friend of Paoli, to the American painter Henry Benbridge, who met in Rome. He represented Paoli in red clothing and was exhibited in London in 1769. Another painting by Benbridge depicts General Paoli at the Battle of Ponte-Novo. In 2021, the museum acquired on the art market a retrospective portrait of Paoli, painted in miniature on porcelain by Sophie Liénard and manufactured around 1840 by the Rihouet factory in Paris. Since then, the museum has continued to make acquisitions to enrich its collections.
