= Caroline Swagers =

French painter

Caroline Swagers (born 28 August 1808) was a French painter of miniatures.

Swagers was born in Paris, the daughter of painters Franz and Élisabeth Swagers; her mother was also her teacher. Her brother, Charles (born 1792) was also a painter.

Caroline Swagers exhibited her work at the Paris Salon between 1831 and 1848. She died in Paris on 5 November 1877 at the age of 69.

== Collections ==
- Portrait de femme, Musée Garinet, Châlons-en-Champagne.
- La Curieuse, 1834, Musée Antoine Lécuyer, Saint-Quentin.
