= Charles Swagers =

French painter

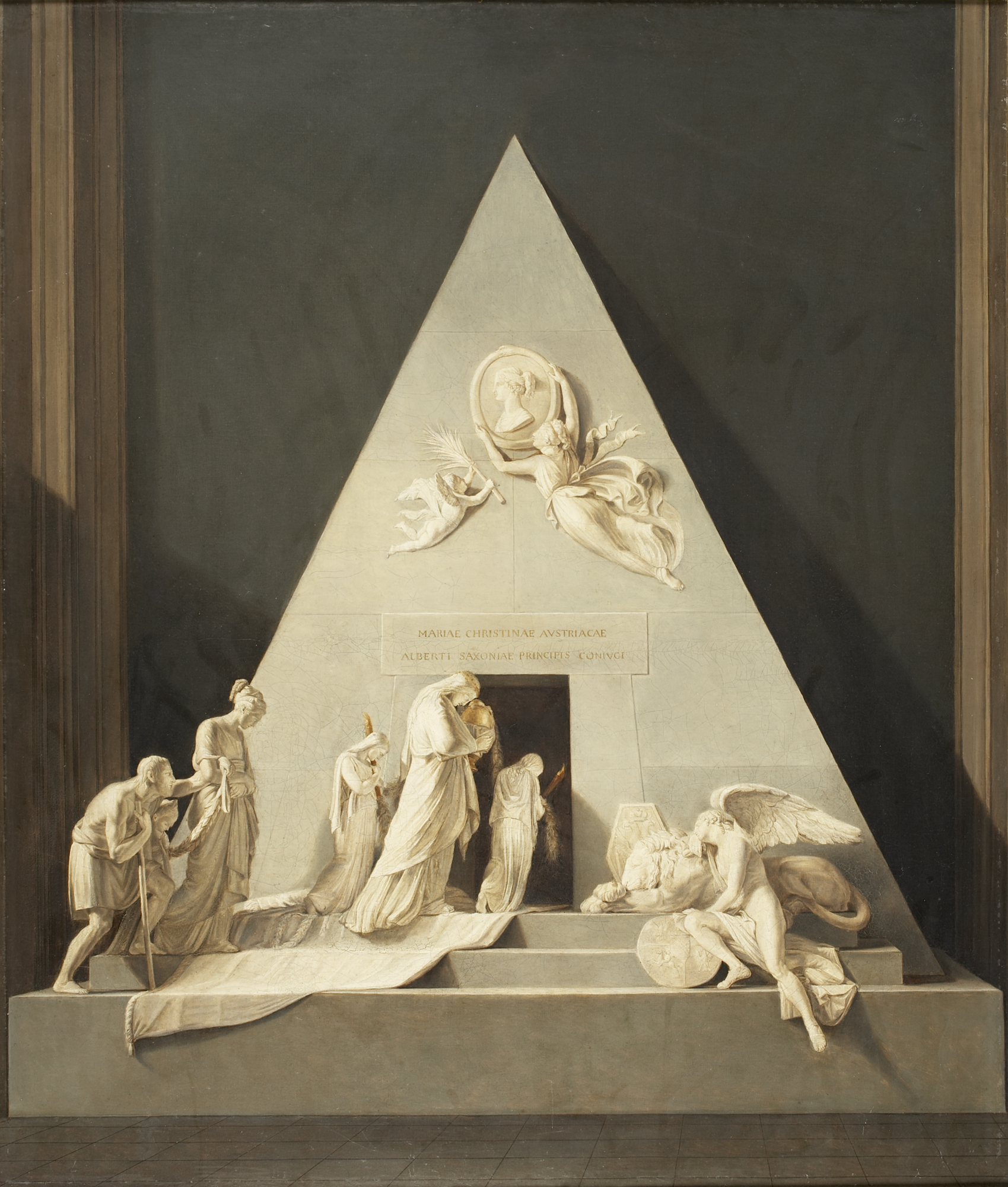
- The Tomb of Maria Christina of Austria, by Antonio Canova, 1820s, Princeton University Art Museum
- Born: 1792
- Died: after 1849
- Known for: History painting

Charles Swagers (1792-after 1849) was a French painter, primarily of historical subjects, active in the early 19th century. He studied under his father, Franz Swagers, a landscape and marine painter from Utrecht who had settled in Paris. Swagers is best known for the grisaille he exhibited at the Paris Salon of 1833 titled The Tomb of Maria Christina of Austria, by Antonio Canova. A painting of St. Nicholas by Swagers is preserved in the church of Saint-Louis in Gien. In 1840 he was appointed professor of drawing and composition in Dieppe.

His mother, Elisa, née Méri, was a miniature painter and the professor of drawing at Écouen. His sister, Caroline, also a student of their father's, practiced in Paris and was a frequent exhibitor from the Salon of 1831 onwards. Charles Swagers' son, Édouard, was a painter and lithographer who also practiced in Paris.
