= Madeleine Caudel =

French painter

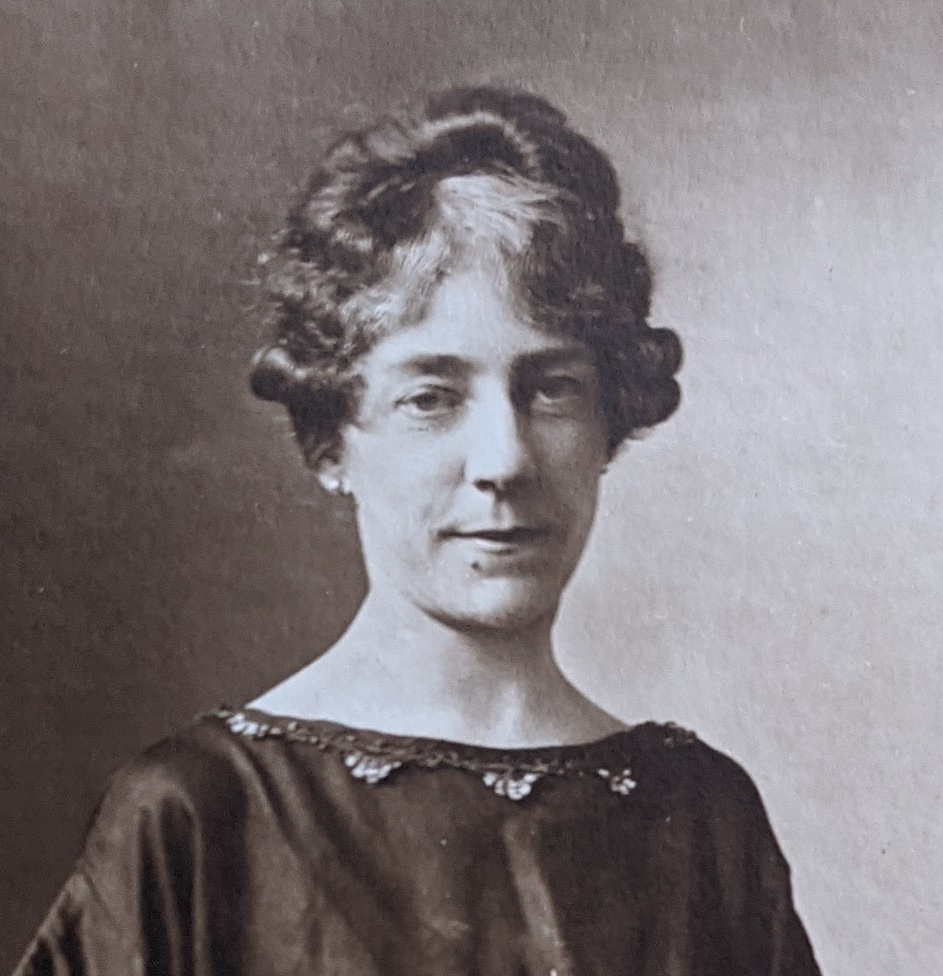
- Born: May 21, 1879 (Paris)
- Died: January 27, 1962 (Paris)
- Known for: Painter
- Movement: Post-Impressionism

Madeleine Caudel (21 May 1879 in Paris – 27 January 1962 in Paris) was a French woman landscape painter. Madeleine Caudel was a member of the Société du Salon des Artistes Français.

She is not to be confused with painters Madeleine Caudel (1905–1993) and Mathilde Caudel-Didier.

== Biography ==
In Paris, she lived at 17e, 75, street Nollet.

From about 1906 she exhibited at the Société du Salon des Artistes Français. In 1914 she exposed at the Salon de l'Union des femmes peintres et sculpteurs. From 1926 Madeleine Caudel exhibited at the Salon des Indépendants. Between 1929 and 1931 she exhibited at the Gallery Alexandre Lefranc, 15, street La Ville-l'Evêque (Paris) and Gallery Ecalle. In 1934, Caudel exhibited at the Mon Club together with Vera Rockline (1896-1934) and others.

== Sources ==
- Le Radical, 1913/03/26 (A33), p.4, La Vie Municipale; Gallica BnF
- La Revue des beaux-arts, 1921/03 (SER4, N351)- (SER4, N352), p.8; Gallica BnF
