= Marie Parrocel =

French artist (1743–1824)

Marie Parrocel (1743–1824) was a French painter.

Born in Avignon, Parrocel was the second daughter of Joseph-François Parrocel, and in 1776 was listed in the Almanach des peintres as a portraitist working in oil paint and pastel; no pastel by her hand is currently known. She died in Paris at 19 rue de Sèvres.

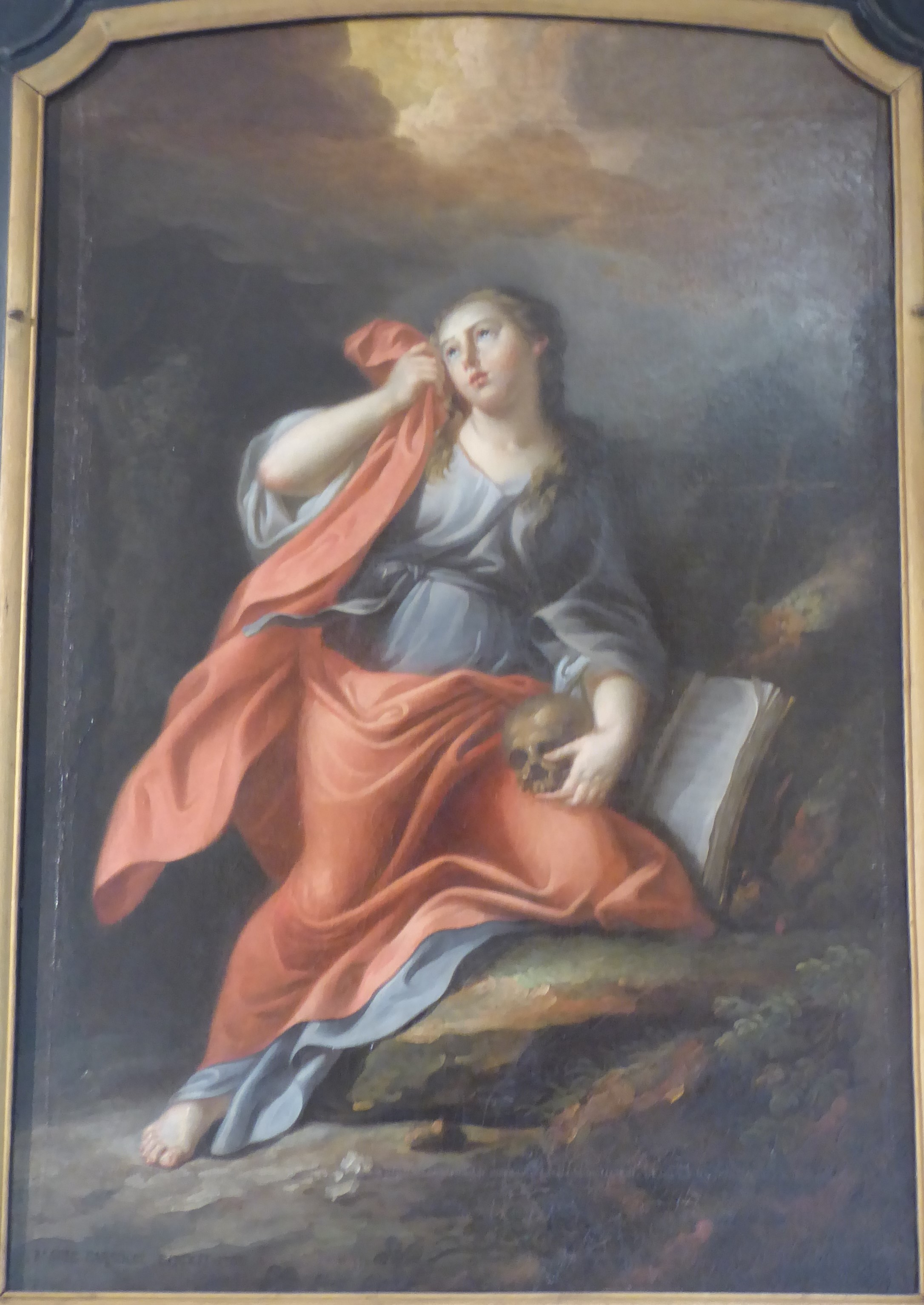
Madeleine repentante, Dreux museum.

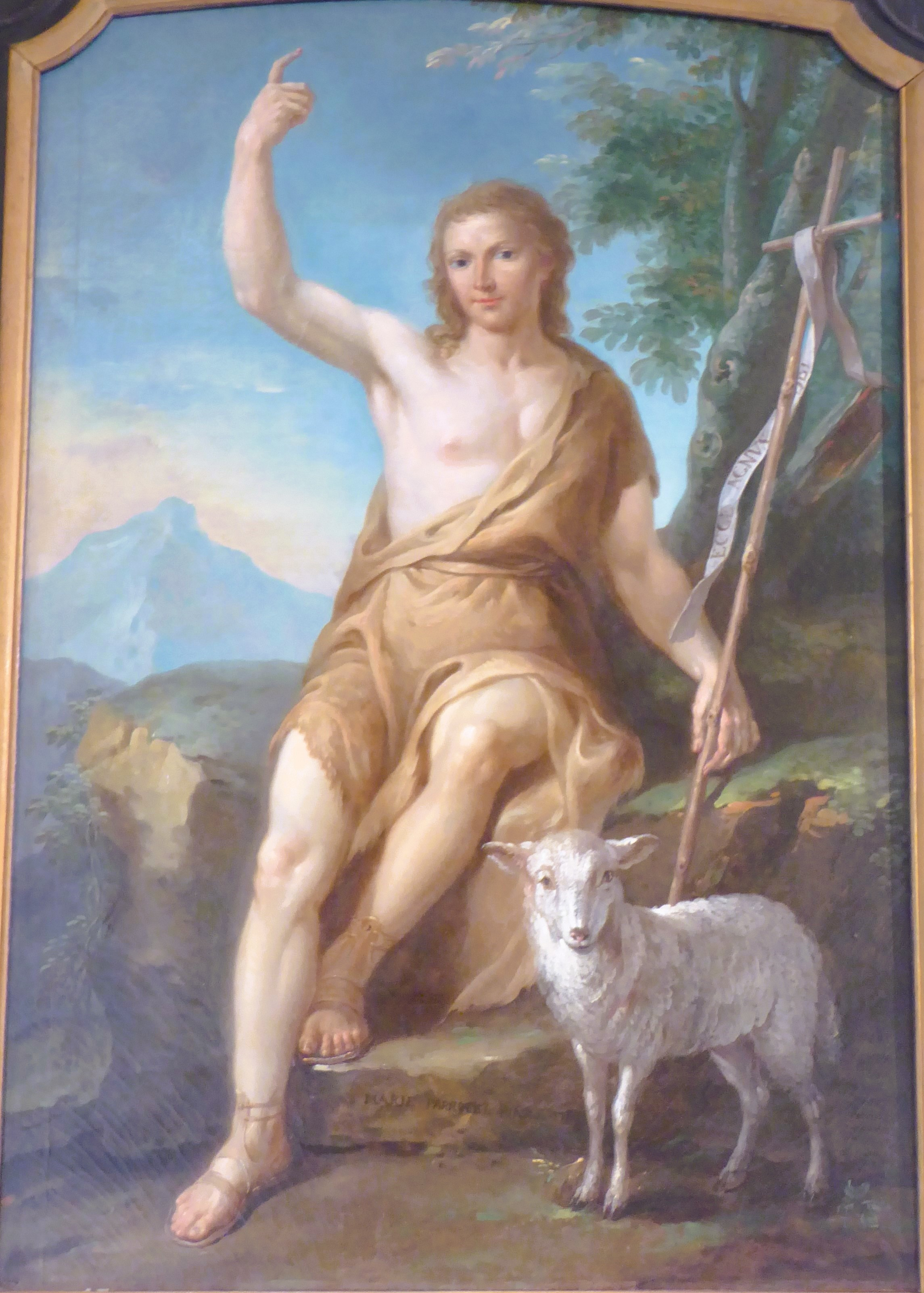
Saint Jean Baptiste, Dreux museum.

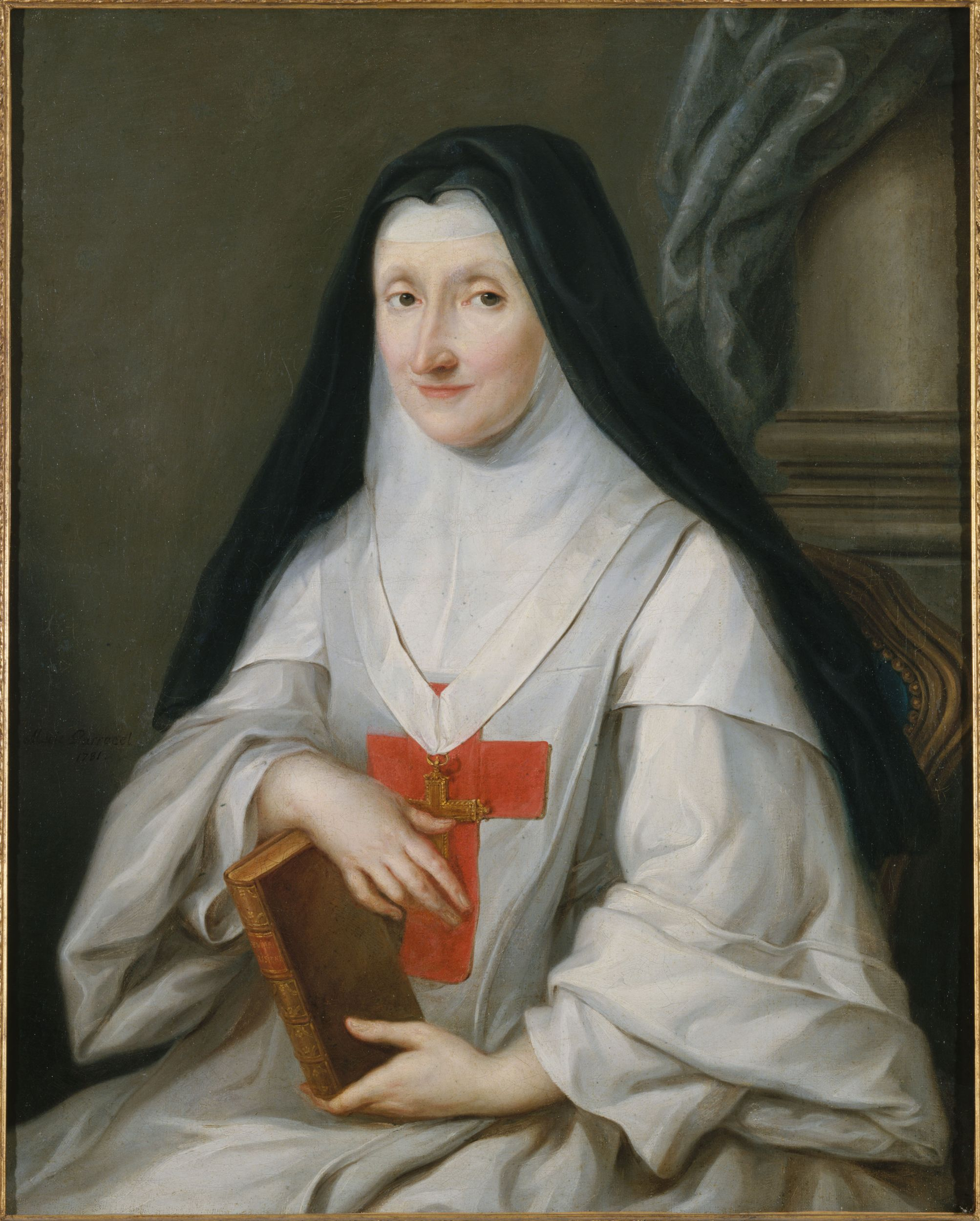
Madame de Montpeyroux, musée Carnavalet, Paris.
