= Cendrine Robelin =

French artist, composer and filmmaker (born 1983)

Cendrine Robelin (born 1983) is a French artist, composer and filmmaker. She is particularly interested in the passage from chaos to the cosmos, to the connections between the macrocosm and the microcosm, around the notions of ecosystem and listening.

Her first long feature film is called "The Window of Dreams" ("La lucarne des rêves"). It's an artistic documentary about electroacoustic music and experimental frames featuring some pioneers like Bernard Parmegiani, Michel Chion and Lionel Marchetti. This film get a wide diffusion in festivals like FID Marseille (2017), International Film Festival Rotterdam (2019) for instance.

Her radiophonic work, between electroacoustic music, hörspiel and creative documentary has received several international prizes (among which : Jury Mention in Luigi Russolo contest in 2012, First Prize on Choc.Ca Contest in 2015 ). In France, her programs are broadcast on radios, in exhibitions and in electroacoustic festivals.

In 2019, she gets the Visual Art Prize of Nantes (France) for her whole work
