= Anne Strésor =

French painter and nun

Anne Marie-Renée Strésor (January 23, 1651 – December 6, 1713) was a French painter specializing in miniatures and a member of the Académie Royale de Peinture et de Sculpture. At the age of thirty, she became a nun.

== Biography ==
Born on January 23, 1651 in the parish of Saint-Germain-l'Auxerrois in Paris, Anne-Renée Strésor is the daughter of the German portrait painter Henri Strésor (around 1613 - December 1679) and Catherine Buart (Bouart or Buert, 1622 - May 1679). She had several sisters and brothers, most of whom died at a young age: Catherine (1646-1647), Catherine-Ursule (1659-1663), Joseph-Guillaume (1661-1668) and François-Henri who became a soldier.

She was likely trained by her father. A skillful miniaturist, it was by creating the miniature portrait of the dauphine Marie-Christine of Bavaria that she really made herself known and attracted the attention of the king. She presented herself to the Académie Royale de Peinture et de Sculpture on July 16, 1676 (or 1677 depending on the source). Accepted the same day, she was the fifth female member of the Academy. Her admission piece, a miniature of Christ and Saint Paul on the Road to Damascus was placed in a window nook in the academy.

Documents from the time describe her as a woman of small stature, friendly, cultured and flirtatious.

During the year 1679, she lost both of her parents within a few months of each other. Her father was fatally injured by a cart in December and died two days after the accident.

== Entry into orders ==
Following the death of her parents, she took the novitiate veil and entered the Visitandines convent of Chaillot in 1681. The exact reason for her entry into the orders, while her art was appreciated and recognized, is unknown. Several are put forward: loneliness following the loss of one's family, money or health problems. A more romantic reason is sometimes given: the existence of a suitor and amorous spite. Despite her lack of wealth, it was her gift for painting that allowed him to enter the order without bringing a dowry. Abandoning miniatures, she took up oil painting to create large paintings which would adorn the sanctuary of her community.

She finally took her vows on May 19, 1687 and took the name Sister Anne-Marie. In addition to her paintings, she also gave drawing and painting lessons to her sisters.

Following vision problems in her later years, she greatly reduced her painting hours and began spinning and sewing. She died in her convent in December 1713 of edema (called dropsy at the time).

== Work ==
No work by Anne Strésor has been found. Those present at the Chaillot convent disappeared during the destruction of the building on August 31, 1794 following the explosion of the Grenelle powder mill.

Some works present in the convent church and destroyed since:

- Immaculate Conception, 1688
- Copies of the Seven Sacraments by Nicolas Poussin
- The Marriage of Saint Joseph
- Birth of Christ
- Saint Joseph
