= Laure Pigeon =

French medium (1882–1965)

- Born: 1882; Paris, France
- Died: 1965 (aged 82–83)
- Known for: Drawing
- Movement: Art brut; Outsider art
- Patrons: Jean Dubuffet

Laure Pigeon (1882–1965) was a French medium who produced an oeuvre of 500 drawings related to her Spiritualist practice. She is considered one of the foremost Art Brut creators.

== Life ==
Laure Pigeon was born in 1882 in Paris. Laure's mother Alida, a laundress, died when she was five years old. After her mother's death she lived in Brittany with her paternal grandmother, where she received a strict upbringing. At twenty-nine she married a dentist against the wishes of her family. Twenty-two years later she separated from her husband, Edmond, after discovering his infidelity. After their separation she lived in a boarding house where she was introduced to Spiritualism by another woman tenant. Fifteen years later, she moved into an apartment in the Paris region where she pursued a solitary practice of Spiritualism.

== Work ==
Pigeon made her first drawing at the age of 52, under Spiritualist inspiration. From the mid-1930s onwards, Pigeon created hundreds of drawings, most featuring images of melancholy female silhouettes, others spelling out words, often embellished names: Laure, Edmond her husband, Alida her mother, Lili her sister, or Peter the Apostle to whom Laure claimed to have been married in a former life. Pigeon's artworks symbolize mainly abstract figures drawn in blue or black ink, some of which also contain written messages and prophecies known to be created by the medium under the effect of a trance.

== Recognition ==
Pigeon's work, 500 large drawings and additional notebooks, was discovered after her death in 1965. Jean Dubuffet acquired her work for his Collection de l'Art Brut.

== Collections and exhibits ==
Pigeon's work is primarily held in the Collection de l'Art Brut museum in Lausanne, Switzerland. Her drawings have been lent to other institutions for exhibitions, including the 2011 Habiter poétiquement le monde exhibit at the Lille Métropole Musée d’art moderne.
