= Élisabeth Swagers =

French artist (c. 1775–1837)

Élisabeth Swagers (born Méri) (c. 1775 – 1837) was a French painter and miniaturist.

Born in Paris, Swagers was a pupil of Augustin Pajou, Adélaïde Labille-Guiard, and Jean-Baptiste Jacques Augustin. Her husband was the Utrecht-born painter Frans Swagers, sometimes Zwagers; the couple lived in Paris for a time. The couple's daughter, Caroline, also became a miniaturist after study with her mother. Élisabeth taught drawing at the Maison d’éducation de la Légion d’honneur at Écouen, and later set up drawing school of her own. Some drawings in chalk and miniatures are recorded, as are a handful of pastels. Swagers died in Paris on 12 June 1837.
