= Lydie Arickx =

French artist

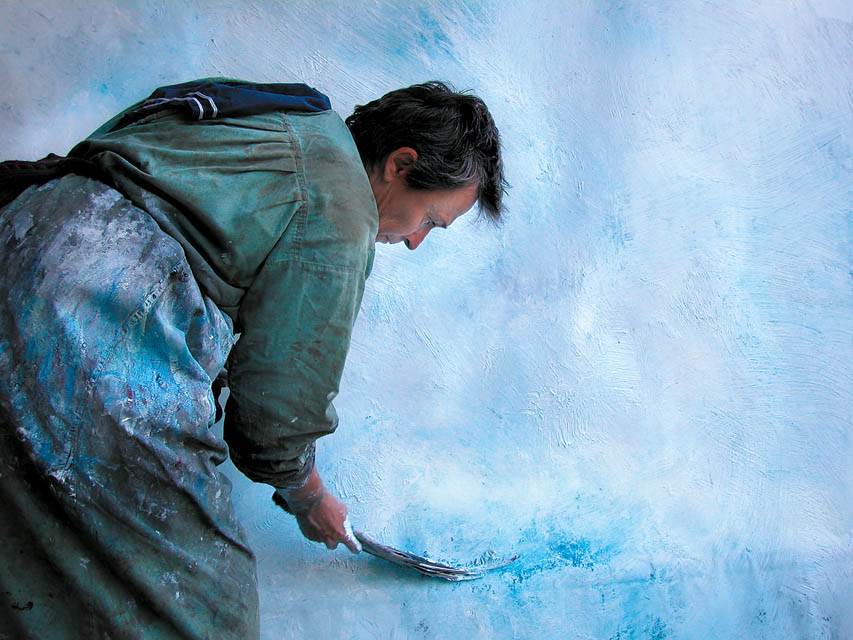
Lydie Arickx in 2006

Lydie Arickx (born 10 January 1954) is a French artist.

== Biography ==
After studying at the School of Graphic Arts (FASE) under Roland Topor from 1974 to 1978, she gave her first solo exhibition in 1979 at the Jean Briance Gallery of pastels and oil paintings. By the early 1980s, she participated in international events such as the Art Basel (Foire de Bâle), Foire Internationale d'Art Contemporain and Art Paris. In 1988 she presented her work in Belgium, Switzerland, Germany, the Netherlands and Spain and the United States, where her work was presented by Amaury Taittinger in New York City.

In 1991, Arickx settled in the Landes, where she has worked on larger projects in monumental sculpture. Since 1993, she made a series of monumental frescoes for different sites in France. In 1998, she established the Alex Bianchi les Rencontres du Cadran, which hosted 80 international and emerging artists over five consecutive years. In 1999, for the 800th anniversary of the jurade Saint Emilion, Arickx presented a double solo exhibition on the theme of crucifixion. More recently she has experimented with a range of materials in her art work, including concrete, emery cloth, wood, fabrics, resins and fibers and bitumen.

In 2026 she presented a deep-water coral-like monumental installation carved from aluminum titled Le Souffle in the great nave of Saint-Eustache Church in Les Halles in Paris.

=== Collections ===
Arickx's work can be found in major national public collections such as the Musée National d'Art Moderne, Palais de Tokyo, FNAC, in the public space of Hôpital Paul-Brousse in Villejuif, the central hospital of Créteil (center hospitalier intercommunal Créteil) and others.

== Personal exhibitions (selection) ==
1982: Jean Briance Gallery, Paris (aide à la première exposition); « L’Amour » : galerie l’Escapade, Genève.

1983: Amaury Taittinger Gallery, New York; galerie Jean Briance, Paris.

1992: Psyche gallery, Martigues; galerie 27, Toulouse; galerie Varga Darlet, Bordeaux.

2000: exposition personnelle dans l'atelier de Guy Lebaigue, Nontron.

2011: «Toreate matter» Espace Van Gogh, Espace Van Gogh, Arles, « L’abandon de la conscience » Le Carmel, Tarbes.

2018: As long as there are ogres, château de Biron.

2021: bare life, exposition personnelle, galerie Capazza.
