= Émilie Desjeux =

French painter (1861–1957)

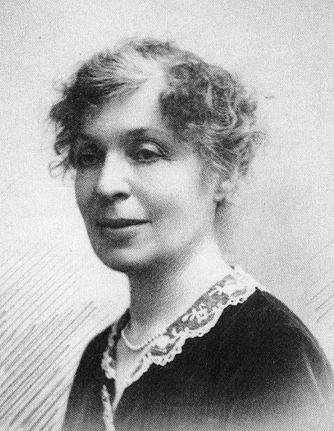
- Émilie Desjeux
- Born: 9 October 1861
- Died: 23 April 1957
- Education: William Bouguereau; Tony Robert-Fleury; Pierre Victor Louis Vignal
- Known for: Painter
- Awards: Officier d'académie

Émilie Desjeux (born 9 October 1861 in Joigny; died 23 April 1957 in Paris) was a French painter.

== Life ==
Emilie Desjeux was born in France, in the city of Joigny on 9 October 1861. When Emilie was little, she moved with her family to Paris, where she started to draw in earnest. Then Emilie Desjeux was admitted to the Académie Julian, where she became a student of William-Adolphe Bouguereau, who greatly appreciated her artistic abilities and named Emilie his best student.

After graduation from Académie Julian, Desjeux was able to feature her paintings at the "Society of the French artists"'s exhibitions and salons. In 1900 she had participated in the "Exposition Universelle (1900)" of Paris. She was decorated with the rank of Officier d'Academie. At the turn of the century Emilie Desjeux took part in the organization "Society of women-artists" and opened in Paris a painting school annex studio for girls in the Rue du Bac, and later moved to Rue Visconti.

Emilie Desjeux traveled across Europe, visiting England, Italy, the Netherlands — and recorded her visits in various albums with sketches and her traveling records. Desjeux was an adherent of realist (or academic) painting. Other directions in the arts failed to influence her.

In 1906 Emilie Desjeux received a commission from the city council of Auxerre: to depict an historical event, the oration of Émile Combes on the division between church and state. For that time, it was unprecedented that this task was assigned to a woman. In 1908 the picture "Speech of Émile Combes" (125 x 256 cm), was unveiled in the city museum of Auxerre. It now decorates the city of Auxerre's administration boardroom.

At present works of Emilie Desjeux are stored at the city of Auxerre's museum depot, are exhibited at the Musée-Abbaye Saint-Germain and can be found in private collections.

Emilie Desjeux died on 23 April 1957. She rests at the cemetery of Bussy-en-Othe, Burgundy.

== Selected works ==
- "Young Boy Eating at the Table". 1887, oil on canvas, 81.28 x 63.50 cm (Weschler's, lot 339, Dec 6, 2013)
- "The banquet at the opening of the market hall of Auxerre". 1908, oil paint on canvas, 125 x 256 cm, („Le banquet d'inauguration du marché couvert à Auxerre", Museums of Auxerre., inv.:1910.8)
- "The Knife-Grinder", 1895–1900, oil paint on canvas, 180 x 111 cm, („Le rémouleur", Museums of Auxerre, inv.:1901.1)
- "Dancer playing the mandolin". 1895–1905, oil paint on canvas, 41 х 33 cm, („Joue de la mandoline", private collection)
- "Self-Portrait". 1931, pastel, („Self-Portrait", unknown)
- "Moonlight in Venice", pastel, 37 x 43 cm, („Venise au clair de lune", Museums of Auxerre, inv.:2006.4.1)

== Notes ==
- Pierre Lebœuf: Emilie Desjeux (1861–1957), artiste peintre, née à Joigny, in: L'Echo de Joigny, n° 55, 1998, S. 67–77, ill.
- 1904–2004 : Auxerre, Musée-Abbaye Saint-Germain, exposition du 12 novembre 2004 au 14 février 2005 / Micheline Durand, Isabelle Vaudois, ISBN 2-909418-24-3
