= Marguerite Sirvins =

French textile artist

- Born: 1890; Lozère, France
- Died: 1955 (aged 64–65)

Marguerite Sirvins (1890–1955) was a French textile artist associated with outsider art.

Sirvins was born to a family of farmers in the French region of Lozère, and developed symptoms of schizophrenia aged 41. After her confinement to a psychiatric hospital in Saint-Alban, she started creating art with watercolours, embroidery, and textiles.

Sirvins would use found rags and coloured silks working without preparatory sketches, her most notable creation was also her final piece; a wedding dress for her imaginary wedding. The dress was made from hospital bedsheets, with a crochet technique. Sirvins stopped creating art in 1955 shortly before her death, after suffering from delirium and hallucinations. Sirvins doctor, Roger Gentis, helped preserve her artworks and they are exhibited in the collection of the Collection de l'art brut in Lausanne.
