= Antoinette Gensoul-Desfonts =

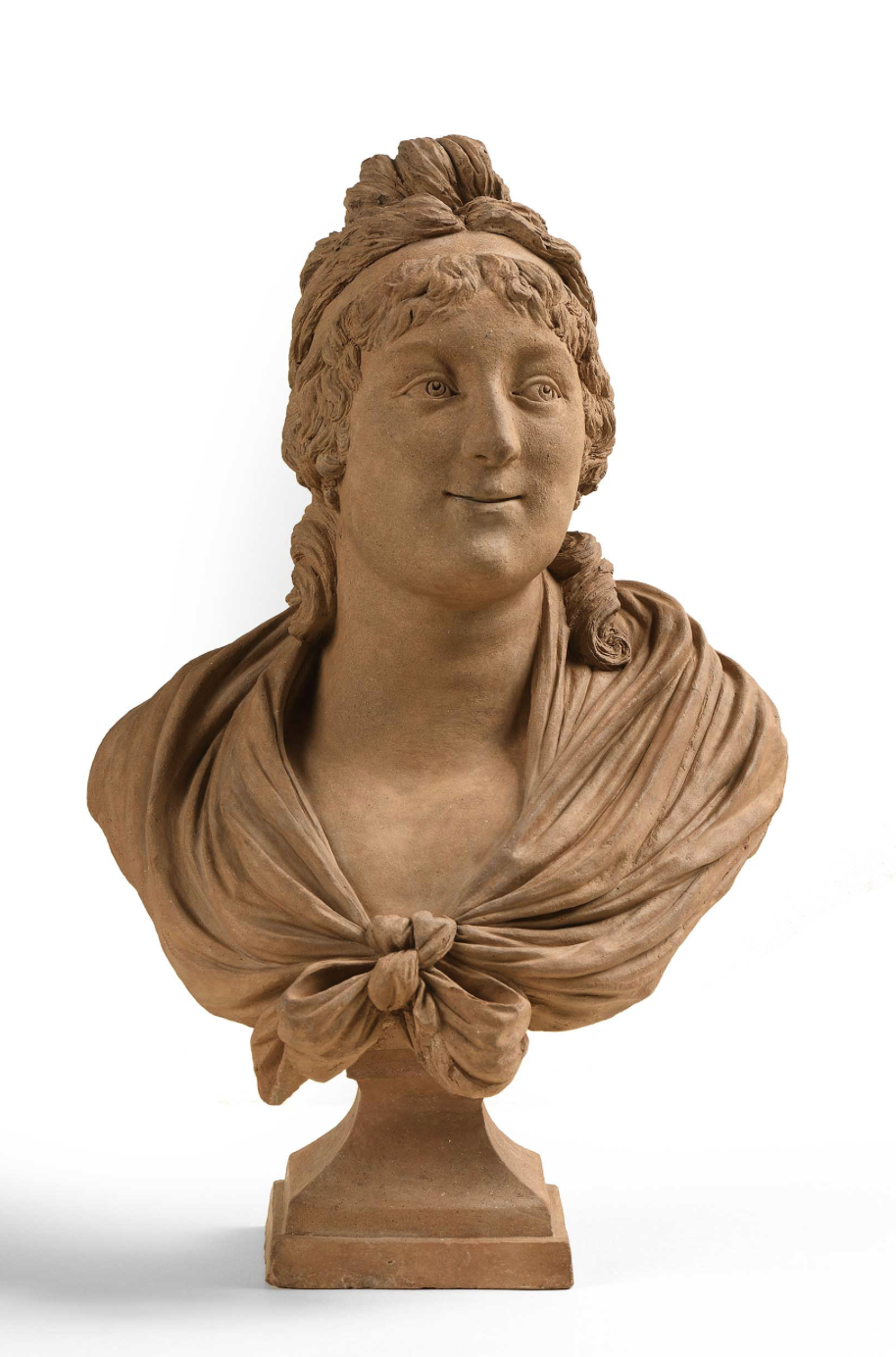
Portrait of a woman by Antoinette Gensoul-Desfonts (1794), maybe a self-portrait

Marguerite-Antoinette Painclair, known professionally as Antoinette Gensoul-Desfonds (c.1769–1824), was a pioneering French sculptor who exhibited at the Paris Salon during the French Revolutionary Period.

== Life ==
Marguerite-Antoinette Painclair was born around 1769. She received her artistic training in London, studying with Agostino Carlini, an Italian sculptor of the Royal Academy. Later, she married fellow artist Jean-Louis-Basile Gensoul, a student of Jean-Baptiste Regnault.

Gensoul-Desfonts was a committed supporter of Revolutionary and Republican ideals. Her sympathies are reflected in the works she exhibited at the 1793 Paris Salon, which included a proposed monument celebrating Liberty and the triumph of Law, Philosophy, and Charity over Despotism, as well as a terracotta sculpture of the revolutionary martyr Michel Le Peletier. The couple's son, born that year, was named Brutus, evoking the Roman figure celebrated for defending the Republic against tyranny.

During the early years of the French Revolution, Gensoul-Desfonts took part in efforts by artists to defend their professional autonomy and secure fair access to state support, signing petitions that challenged secret appointments and called for greater transparency in the governance of the arts.

Gensoul-Desfonts maintained her studio on Paris's Left Bank, first on the rue des Cordeliers and then on the rue de Vaugirard, before later moving to the northeast of the city on the rue de Bondi.

She exhibited at the Paris Salon between 1791 and 1799, after which no artistic activity is recorded. Subsequently, she moved to the village of Connaux in the Gard district, where she died on 16 October 1824 at her home.

== Works ==
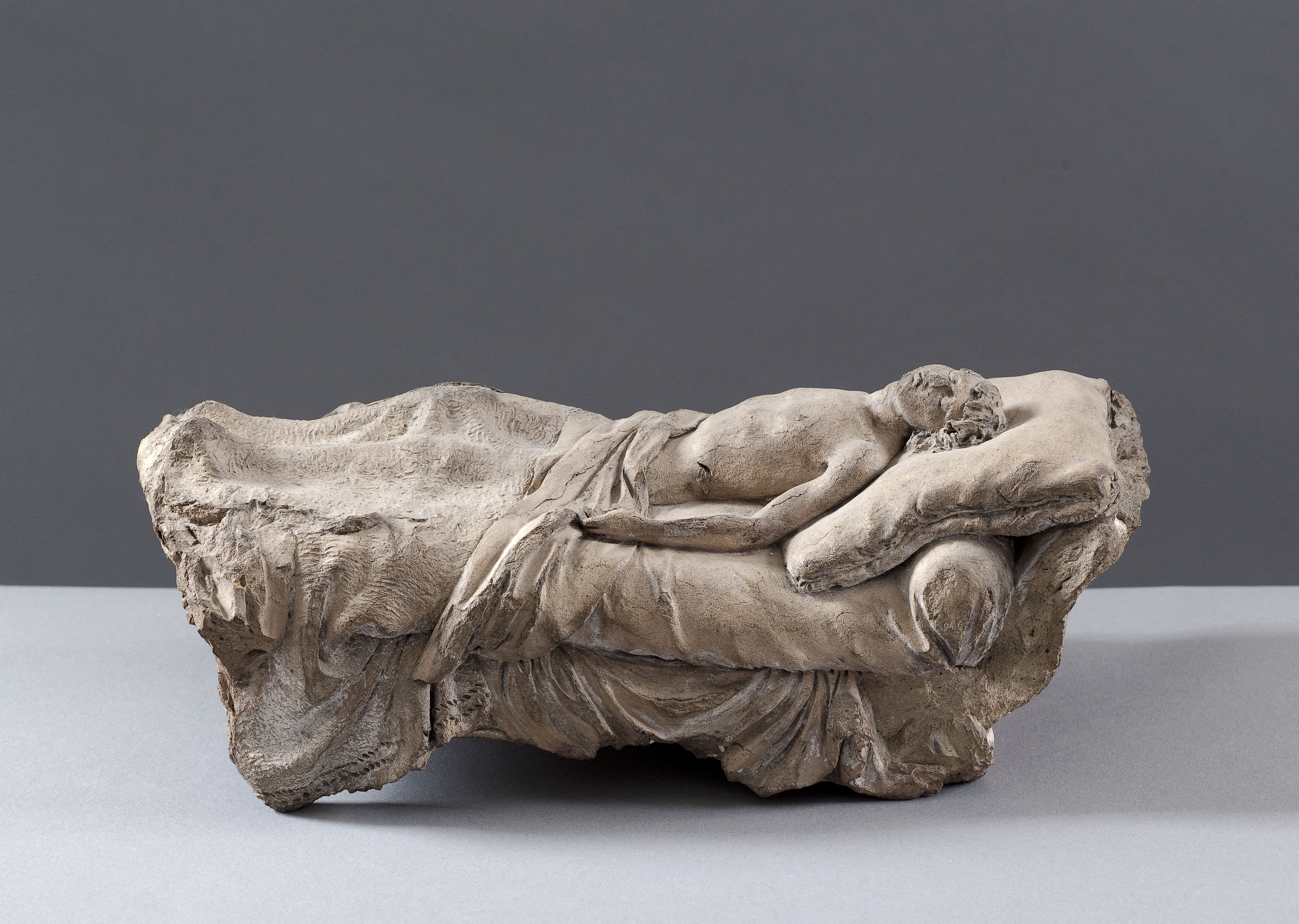
Terracotta sketch of a monument to Le Peletier, which may be by Gensoul-Desfonts.

Antoinette Gensoul-Desfonts was primarily a sculptor and relief artist, producing allegorical works and intimate genre scenes in terracotta. She belonged to the first generation of women sculptors in France to work on state commissions for public or semi-public spaces, a pioneering cohort which also included Marie-Anne Collot, Julie Charpentier, Félicie de Fauveau, and Marie d’Orléans. In 1792, Gensoul-Desfonts received a commission to create reliefs for a planned column to be erected on the ruins of the Bastille. The plaster model for the column was exhibited at the 1793 Paris Salon.

Another of Antoinette's works shown that year, Michel Le Peletier, on his deathbed, writing his final words, was likely a sketch model created for the National Convention’s competition for a marble monument to Le Peletier, launched that January. Neither project was ultimately carried forward.

A terracotta sketch of Le Peletier on his deathbed, held by the Musée Carnavalet, has been tentatively attributed by scholar Suzanne Glover Lindsay to Gensoul-Desfonts. However, the inscription does not match a known example of her handwriting.

The names of a number of works by Gensoul-Desfonts are known from catalogues of the Paris Salon.

=== Paris Salon ===
Year	Work	English translation
1791	Groupe allégorique en terre cuite	Allegorical Group in Terracotta
1793	Projet de colonne triomphale pour être placée sur les ruines de la Bastille	Project for a triumphal column to be erected on the ruins of the Bastille
1793	Un Africain mordu par un serpent	An African Man Bitten by a Snake
1793	Michel Le Peletier, sur son lit de mort, écrivant ses dernières paroles	Michel Le Peletier, on his deathbed, writing his final words
1796	La Captivité comptait les heures	Captivity was counting the Hours
1796	L’Amour qui vient la visiter les couvre d’un voile	Love, coming to visit her, covers her with a veil
1799	Le Goûter de Philis et de Daphnis	The Afternoon Snack of Phyllis and Daphnis
1799	Portrait de femme ayant une lettre à la main	Portrait of a Woman Holding a Letter in Her Hand
1799	Une laitière portant son lait au marché	A Milkmaid Carrying Her Milk to the Market
1799	Une jeune fille parlant à un jeune homme à la fenêtre	A Young Woman Speaking to a Young Man at the Window
