= Madeleine Fié-Fieux =

French painter (1897–1995)

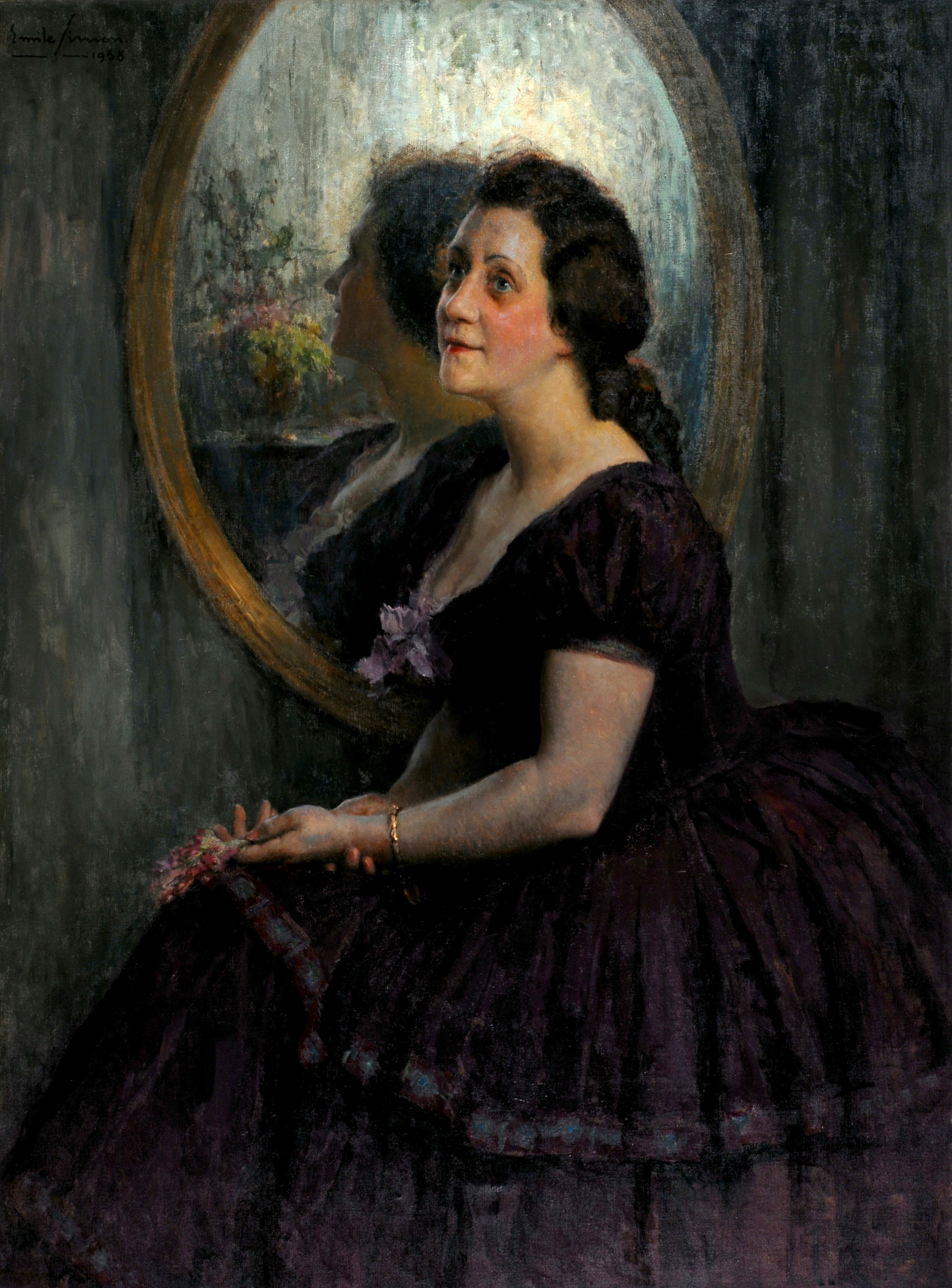
Madeleine Fié-Fieux painted by Émile Simon (1938)

Madeleine Fié-Fieux (23 September 1897, Varennes-Changy — 28 August 1995, Clohars-Fouesnant) was a French painter. A student of the Académie Julian, she married the dentist Philippe Fieux with whom she moved to Nantes. In 1930, she continued studying painting at the city's art college where she developed a close friendship with her teacher Émile Simon. After the Second World War, Fié-Fieux, her husband and Simon moved into Squividan Manor near Bénodet, where they lived together for the next 30 years. She and Simon painted together in their studio there. Fie-Fieux is remembered mainly for her portraits, flower paintings and depictions of Breton statues. After Simon died in 1976, she created a museum on the estate where she exhibited his paintings together with a few of her own.

== Early life and education ==
Born in Varennes-Changy on 21 September 1897, Madeleine Fié was the daughter of the dentist Émile-Édouard Fié (1873–1952) and his wife Joséphine Maria née Desforges (1872–1958) who went on to run a pharmacy. Raised in a well-to-do family, from the age of six she attended the Lycée Molière in Paris where she proved to be a talented artist. She was given additional training in drawing in the Passy Town Hall. As a result of her early paintings, she was recommended to the Académie Julian where she studied for about ten years.

== Career ==
Around 1926, she met Philippe Fieux (1896–1980) a friend of her father's who was studying dentistry. After he graduated, the couple married and moved to Nantes. Fié-Fieux decided to continue her art studies, receiving private tuition under Émile Simon who taught at the Nantes Fine Arts School.

Fié-Fieux developed a close friendship with Simon who became her permanent mentor. After Nantes was bombed during the Second World War, she and her husband moved to Quimper and soon afterwards to the Squividan estate near Bénodet where they were joined by Simon. All three lived happily together there for some thirty years. Simon and Fié-Fieux painted together in a studio on the second floor of the manor house, inspired by scenes they saw in their travels around Brittany. Simon was highly productive but Fié-Fieux also produced portraits, still-lifes and religious works. She was a particularly competent portrait painter.

Simon died on 25 September 1976, leaving a huge collection of his paintings which Fié-Fieux had encouraged him not to sell. In 1990, after suffering a burglary, she decided to donate them, together with her own works, to the Department of Finistère on condition the Squividan Manor was converted into a public museum.

Madeleine Fié-Fieux died on 28 August 1995 in the Squividan Manor, Clohars-Fouesnant, aged 97. Her paintings are exhibited at Squividan.
