= Agnès Mauzé =

Agnès Mauzé (c. 1713–1788) was a French nun and self-taught artist, known for her skill and savant-like attention to detail in painting, drawing and relief modelling. She spent her entire life cloistered at the Convent of the Daughters of Notre-Dame in Richelieu, where she became Mother Superior in the 1760s.

== Life ==
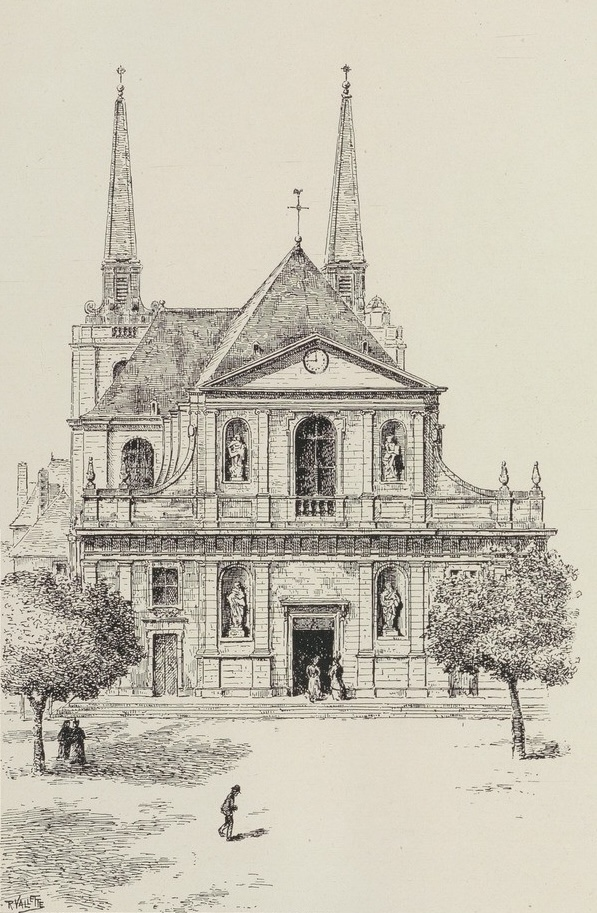
The Church of Notre-Dame in Richelieu, affiliated with Mauzé's convent. Engraving by R. Valette.

Mauzé was born around 1713 in the commune of Richelieu in central-western France. Orphaned in childhood, she entered the Convent of the Daughters of Notre-Dame of her home town at the age of sixteen. Contemporary sources describe her as generous and kindly, with a keen mind and a devotion to study.

After entering religious life, Mauzé began to focus on artistic pursuits. Without any formal training, she became skilled as a draughtsperson, painter, sculptor, and as a maker of architectural models. In her early years she produced small devotional objects, such as reliquaries and grottoes, in which peers recognised an unusual dexterity. She later progressed to larger-scale works including intricate reliefs of military campaigns and architectural landmarks.

In addition to sculpture and painting, Mauzé pursued embroidery, music, and poetry.

During her years at Notre-Dame, Mauzé held multiple positions and by 1769 had become superior of her community, replacing Marie Chauviri des Vertus. A contemporary source describes her surrounded by the sisters of the convent who worked "actively and obediently, like in a fertile and well-ordered hive".

In her later years, declining health led Mauzé to resign from her duties. She died on 6 March 1788, at the age of approximately 75.

== Artistic activities ==
Most of what is known about Mauzé's artistic output comes from the testimony of her contemporary, the lawyer Jouhet. In a letter he sent to a historical and literary journal, Jouhet reports that Mauzé's first public success was an elaborately crafted grotto made for a relative who was a lawyer in Richelieu. She then reportedly turned to large-scale narrative and architectural compositions in relief, constructed from gilded cardboard, paper, silk thread, foil, and wire.

Mauzé also produced paintings and drawings, including designs later transferred by professional enamelers. Her convent church and halls were decorated with works of her own creation.

Jouhet notes that Mauzé's self-taught mastery of the arts astonished observers, particularly as she had never left the convent. Emphasising her meticulous attention to detail, he observed that even experienced sailors could find nothing inaccurate in her representations of ships, despite her having seen them only in paintings.

== Works ==
Mauze's notable works include a view of the port of Brest, as well as plans of the Chapel of Versailles and the Temple of Diana of Ephesus, burned by Herostratus. Her commissioned relief works also include:

- A panoramic model of the Kingdom of Sardinia, created for King Charles Emmanuel III, showing his cities, fleets, and military formations inside a grand grotto setting. The king reportedly admired its technical execution and imaginative scope.
- The Capture of Port Mahon, presented to the Marshal Duke of Richelieu, founder of the convent. The work showed the storming of Fort Saint-Philippe with military accuracy, including artillery, troop formations, naval vessels, and a depiction of the marshal himself.
- A relief model of the Château de Richelieu, completed over two years, showing not only the buildings but also gardens, canals, fountains, statues, and crowds of figures with carriages and cabriolets. Though she had only seen the château twice, the piece was produced with fidelity from drawings alone. It was enclosed in a glass case with gilded framing and was displayed in the duke's Paris residence.
