= Kathy Toma =

French visual artist

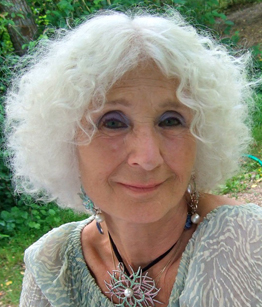
Kathy Toma

Kathy Toma (born 22 March 1944, Chambilly, Saône-et-Loire) is a French visual artist whose works combine painting with photography, sculpture, jewelry and lost objects. She is known in particular for her deep interest in the Italian composer Carlo Gesualdo whose music inspired her work for over 20 years leading not only to paintings but to presentations combining choral music with photography, film and screen-supported installations. Her works have been widely exhibited in France and Italy.

== Early life and education ==
Born in Chambilly on 22 March 1944, Kathy Toma is the daughter of a pianist. After studying drama, music and literature in Strasbourg, she earned a Ph.D. in history of art from the Sorbonne.

== Career ==
For many years, Toma has lectured at the Centre Pompidou. Her works, which have been exhibited in numerous exhibitions in Italy and France, address myth and memory, combining classical painting with film, video, innovative sculpture and jewelry. In particular, over more than 20 years she has devoted attention to developing her artistic work to Carlo Gesualdo, a composer of madrigals who lived in Ferrara in the late 16th century. In 2002, she presented paintings for the Chiesa di Maria Santissima Addolorata (Our Lady of Sorrows Church, 17th century) in Gesualdo, where she has become an honorary citizen. She has also contributed an impressive series of frescos to Gesualdo's Chiesa di San Rocco displayed in seven panels.

Of particular note is her monumental fresco Polyptych for Expo 2015 at the Milan Cathedral. Toma has conducted research over a number of years and has been a frequent lecturer at the Centre Pompidou in Paris from 1977 to 2009.
