= Marie-Alexandrine Mathieu =

French artist

Marie-Alexandrine Mathieu (1838-1908) was a French artist known for her etchings.

Her work is included in the collections of the National Gallery of Canada, the National Gallery of Australia and the Petit Palais, Paris.
