= Adèle Varillat =

French portraitist and genre painter (1769-1861)

Adèle Tornézy-Varillat
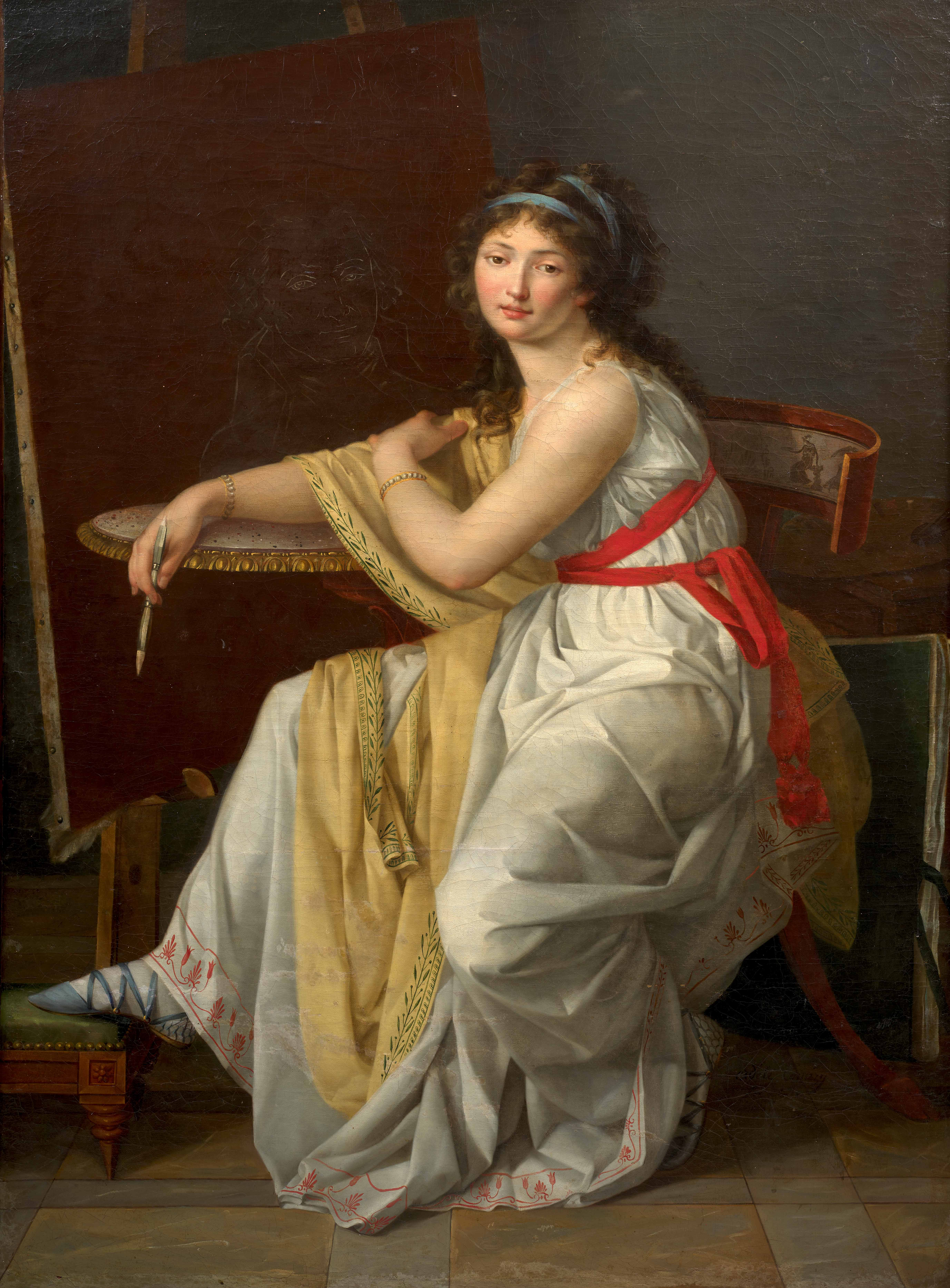
- Believed to be a self-portrait of Adèle Tornézy-Varillat
- Born: 22 March 1769; Fontaine-Française, Côte-d'Or
- Died: 1 December 1861 (aged 92); Paris

Adèle Tornézy-Varillat, née Anne Henriette Adélaïde Tornézy (1769–1861), was a French portraitist and genre painter active from the French First Republic into the early decades of the 19th century.

== Life ==
Tornézy-Varillat was born on 22 March 1769 into an upper-middle-class family in Fontaine-Française. She was the daughter of Anne Claudine Thévenin and Jean-Baptiste Marie Tornézy, a lawyer before the sovereign court who was also holder of the office of royal tax collector in Besançon. Her godfather was canon of the King’s Sainte-Chapelle in Dijon.

Her family’s resources enabled her to study art privately, first under the neoclassical painter Jean-Baptiste Regnault, and later with Guillaume Guillon-Lethière. Tornézy-Varillat’s work was first shown at the Salon de Paris in 1795, where her name appeared as Citoyenne Tornézy, following the revolutionary practice of replacing titles with the republican “citizen”. Her studio at this time was on rue de Saint-Pierre in Montmartre.

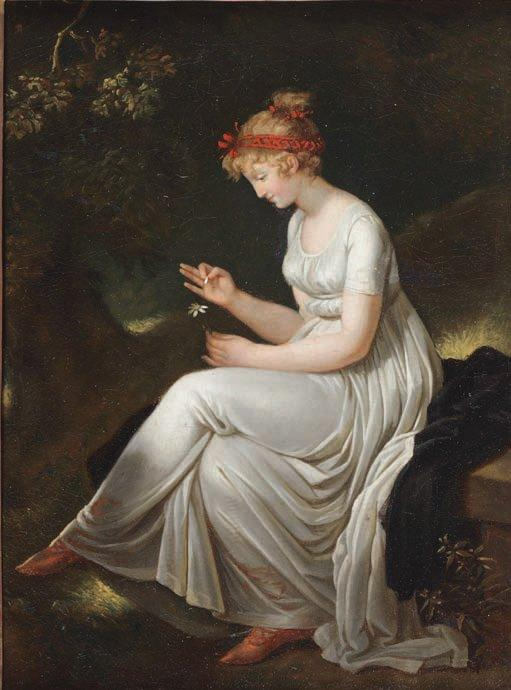
A young girl trying to read her fortune in a daisy

On the twelfth day of Brumaire, Year VI of the Republican calendar (6 November 1797) Tornézy married Claude-Joseph Varillat, a wine merchant. The couple moved to a building behind the Louvre on rue Jean-Jacques Rousseau, where Tornézy-Varillat occupied a fourth-floor studio until her husband's death in 1807. An inventory taken in May of that year recorded Tornézy-Varillat's working tools, including two easels, a box of paint, a set of plaster models, and two palettes.

Following her husband’s death, Tornézy-Varillat's appears to have ceased her exhibition activities for close to a decade.

In 1817 she began showing at the Royal Academy, having settled in London on Great Castle-Street near Cavendish Square. While in England, Tornézy-Varillat offered private painting lessons for young women, teaching figure painting in oils as well as miniature painting in watercolours. Classes were held at her studio for a fee of two guineas per month plus an entrance charge of half a guinea. Her advertisement in the Times described her as "a well-educated Parisian" from a "highly respectable circle of society".

She exhibited at the Royal Academy until 1820 and had returned to Paris by 1833, when she was recorded living on the rue du Colombier in the Faubourg Saint-Germain. Tornézy-Varillat remained active as an artist into her sixties, but few records survive concerning her later life. She died on 1 December 1861 at the institution Sainte-Périne in Paris at the age of 92 and was buried in the Cimetière de Montmartre.

== Exhibition history ==
Year	Venue	Work(s) Exhibited
1795	Paris Salon	Portrait of a Woman (Portrait de femme)
1798 (Thermidor, Year VI)	Paris Salon	Portrait of a Man, Oval (Portrait d'homme, ovale)
1804	Paris Salon	A Young Girl Trying to Read Her Fortune in a Daisy (Une jeune fille cherchant à lire son sort dans une reine-marguerite); A Young Woman Weeping Over Her Divorce (Une jeune femme pleurant sur son acte de divorce); A Young Woman Leaving the Baths (Une jeune femme sortant des bains)
1806	Paris Salon	The Satisfied Mother (La mère satisfaite); Portraits Under the Same Number (Portraits sous le même numéro)
1817	Royal Academy, London	Portrait of a Gentleman; Portrait of a Lady; Portrait of the Duc de Chartres
1818	Royal Academy, London	Portraits of a Lady and Her Daughter; The Recovery, or filial affection
1819	Royal Academy, London	Portrait of a Professor of the Harp
1820	Royal Academy, London	Portrait of a Lady
1833	Paris Salon	A Portrait of a Woman (Un portrait de femme)
