= Emma Herland =

French painter

- Born: February 16, 1856; Cherbourg
- Died: January 5, 1947 (aged 90); Quimper

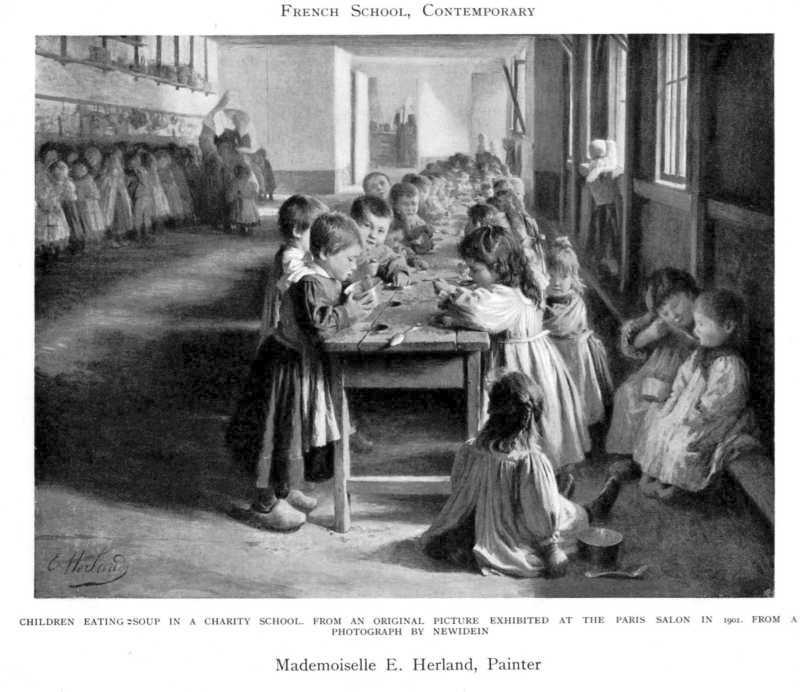
Children Eating Soup in a Charity School, 1901

Emma Herland (1856 – 1947) was a French painter.

== Biography ==
Herland was born in Cherbourg and became a pupil of Jules Lefebvre and Benjamin Constant. She first exhibited at the Paris Salon of 1879. She was a member of the Société des Artistes Français from 1886 onwards and won an honourable mention in 1901.

Her work Children Eating Soup in a Charity School was included in the book Women Painters of the World. Herland died in Quimper.
