= Angélique Charbonnée =

French artist (c. 1740–after 1780)

Angélique Charbonnée (c.1740 – after 1780) was a French engraver.

Very little is known of her life but Charbonnée is known from her engravings after old masters. One of which she signed A. Charbonnée sculp. She is known for her engravings after David Teniers the Younger.
