= Michèle Van de Roer =

French artist

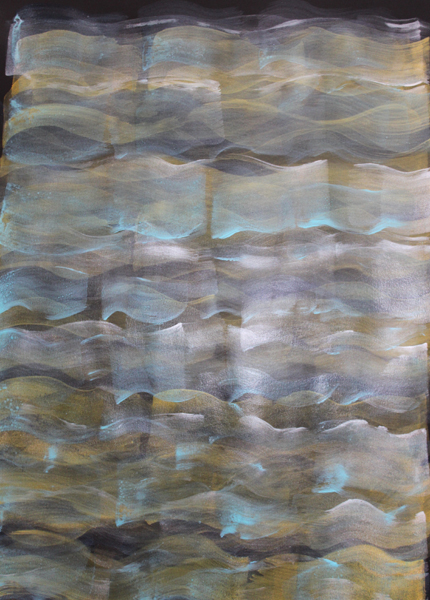
Lightwaves by Michèle Van de Roer.

Michèle Van de Roer (born 12 September 1956 in The Netherlands at Delft) is a contemporary French artist: a painter, designer, photographer, and engraver.

== Life ==
Van de Roer was born in Delft. She studied formally at the École d'Arts de Valence, Pratt Institute of Design in New York, and École Nationale Supérieure du Paysage in Versailles. Van de Roer currently works at the Fondation La Ruche in Montparnasse, Paris, and is also an adjunct professor of landscape design at École Nationale Supérieure du Paysage.

== Early biography ==
The daughter of an architect in Delft, Michèle Van de Roer demonstrated an early fascination with perspective as she sat at draftsman's tables in her father's studio. Starting at age five she began drawing freehand landscapes of the surrounding countryside, manifesting a remarkable ability to portray depth and to capture shadow and light with a sophistication that both surprised and impressed her father. The same Dutch scenery with its neat, tree lined geometric shapes that had inspired 17th century masters such as Vermeer and then modern artists such as Piet Mondrian, was endlessly fascinating to her. Encouraged by her father, she studied and practiced drafting throughout her childhood.

== Training ==
She began to study photography and etching. She moved permanently to France in 1976 and studied etching at Lacourière Frelaut under the tutelage of Jacques Frelaut, the master printer of Picasso, Chagall and Léger.

From 1977 through 1980 she attended the École d'Arts de Valence and was a student of artist Pierre Buraglio and Jacques Clerc, her instructor for advanced etching techniques. Jacques Clerc, an artist, sculptor and publisher, subsequently asked her to create etchings for the limited edition L'Automne Écorché Vif for his publishing imprint, Éditions La Sétèrée. Additionally, at École d'Arts de Valence she was also a student of noted contemporary artist Pierre Soulages. During 1980–81 she completed her undergraduate studies in art history at the University of Grenoble.

In 1982 Van de Roer received a Fulbright Scholarship and used the financial support to pursue, and to complete in 1983, a fine arts masters program at the Pratt Institute of Design in Brooklyn, New York. During this postgraduate education at Pratt in 1982-3, she was selected by a jury to show in the "Architecture in Contemporary Prints" show at Pratt Manhattan Gallery in New York along with Robert Rauschenberg and Christo. In 2003—06 she attended a postgraduate program, and graduated from, the École National Supérieure du Paysage in Versailles, seeing landscape design as another form of artistic expression. She followed this post graduate program with an internship at the international landscape design firm of Gustafson-Porter in London in 2006.

== La Ruche ==
In 2008 Van de Roer was awarded a position as an artist-in-residence at La Ruche in Paris, the de facto or artistic home in Montparnasse of artists such as Marc Chagall, Fernand Léger, Chaïm Soutine, Amedeo Modigliani, Constantin Brâncuși, and Diego Rivera among others. In 2009 she was one of the featured La Ruche 'artists of today' in an exhibition at the Palais Lumière in Evian entitled, La Cité des Artistes, 1902-2009. In 2010 she delivered a presentation at El Museo Mural Diego Rivera in Mexico City on Rivera's possible contributions to the evolution of the art of his peers at La Ruche and on his contemporary Pablo Picasso.

== Shows ==
The first significant show of Van de Roer's work was in 1983 in New York entitled Architecture in the Contemporary Print at Pratt Manhattan Gallery, along with Robert Rauschenberg and Christo. The show featured one of her large engravings, Eva's Magic World. Subsequently, her work has been displayed at group and solo shows in numerous venues: Galerie Brun Léglise, Paris; Gallery Kunstplus, Rotterdam; John Szoke Gallery, New York; Bibliothèque Nationale de Paris, Exposition de Gravures; Galerie Global Art Source, Zurich; City of Evian; Centre Culturel de Corbevoie, and in the Fernelmont Contemporary Art Show.

== Artistic vision ==
Van de Roer's philosophy on art is perhaps best represented in her etching series entitled De La Journée à la Nuit: Du Blanc au Noir-de-Noir au Blanc which was purchased by the Musée Rodin in Paris. The subject of the piece is Rodin's Thinker. The first of the twelve pieces is opaque, followed by an image with the barest of light revealing the knee and part of the leg of the recumbent Thinker. Each of her succeeding images adds step-by-step gradations of light to reveal more and more of the anatomy, until at last the entire figure is evident. In essence, the figure to her is merely a concept or a complete abstraction without light and/or the absence of light, as suggested by Kazimir Malevich in his famous 1915 canvas Black Square.

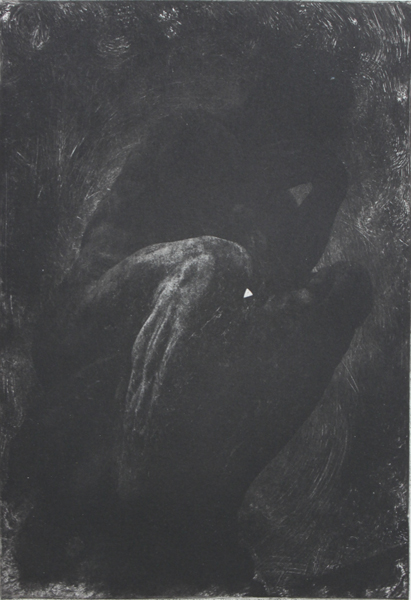
Artist's proof image

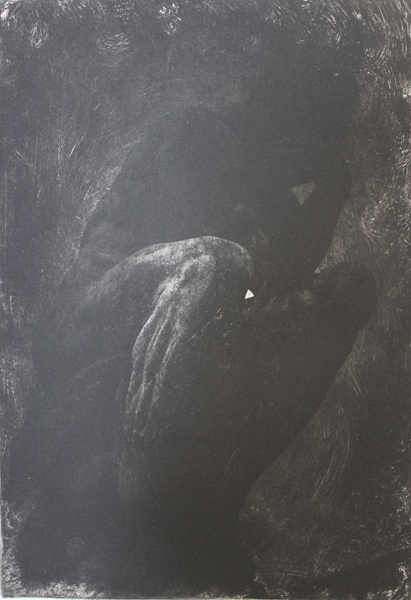
Artist's proof image

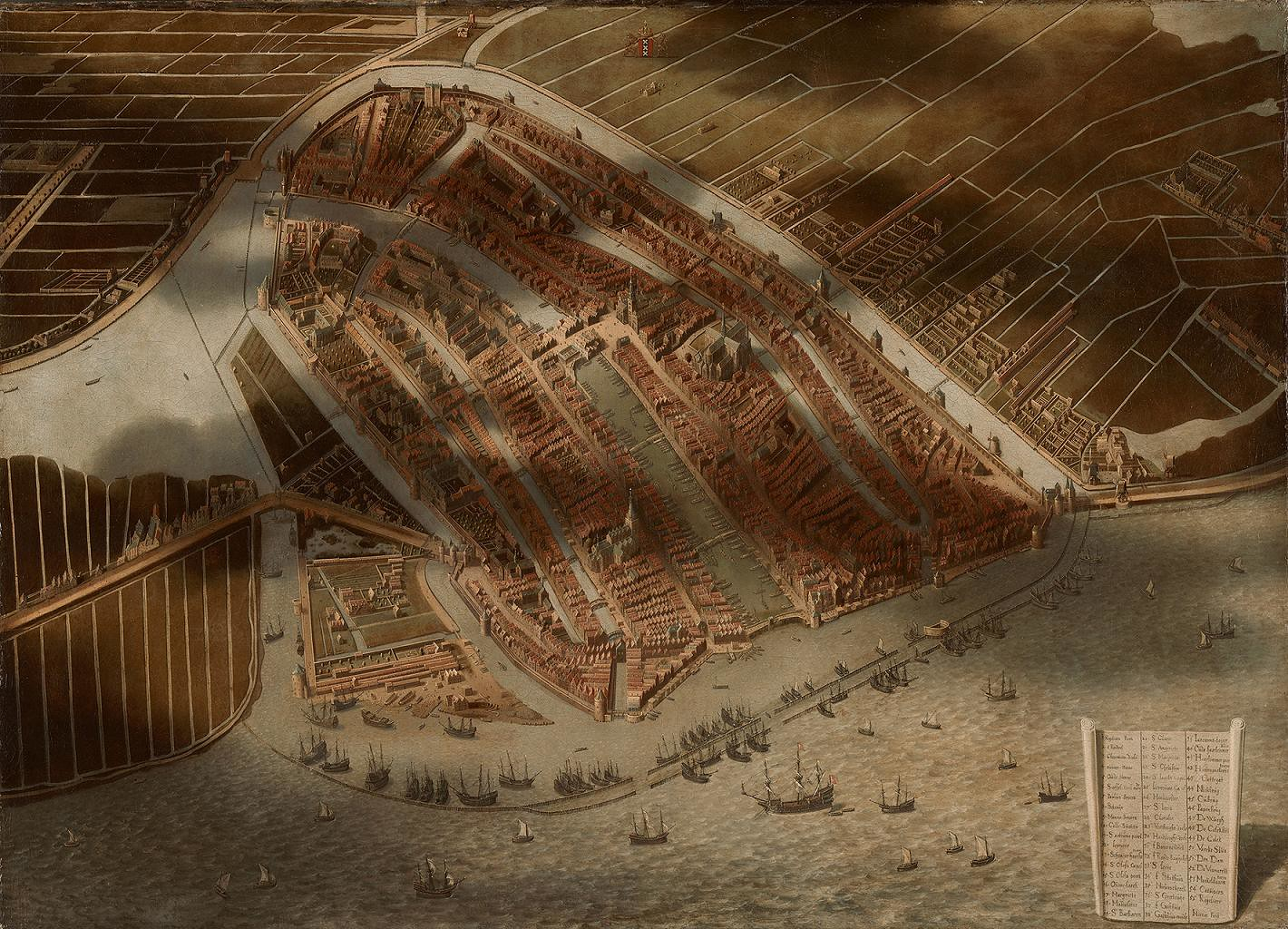
Jan Micker - Bird's Eye View of Amsterdam (ca. 1652). The shadow of dispersed clouds over the city are a fascination for Van de Roer.

Some of her best received oils produced to date demonstrating the same vision are her semi abstract landscapes, notably as in her TGV pieces, that convey rapid motion through the countryside, a blurring of reality. Van de Roer argues that as 16th and 17th century Dutch artists were inspired by the local development of optics that produced new insight into very small or very distant objects, she is inspired by the perspective of light in motion. She admits to a fascination with Jan Micker's 16th century Bird's Eye View of Amsterdam showing the shadow of dispersed clouds as they drift over the city.

Essentially, she is captivated by light, the absence of light, and the bending of light and imagery through motion – as in her photo etching series entitled Dessiner Avec La Lune. To create this series, Van de Roer used a full moon as a photographic ‘brush’ and the night sky as her ‘canvas’ to produce a haunting abstraction. While much of her work is less abstract, the theme of light and motion are constant in all of her creations.

== Publications ==
- Le Jardin de Rodin – Éditions Fischbacher, Paris, 1995
- L'Automne Écorché Vif – Éditions La Sétèrée Crest, 1998
