= Marie-Cunégonde Huin =

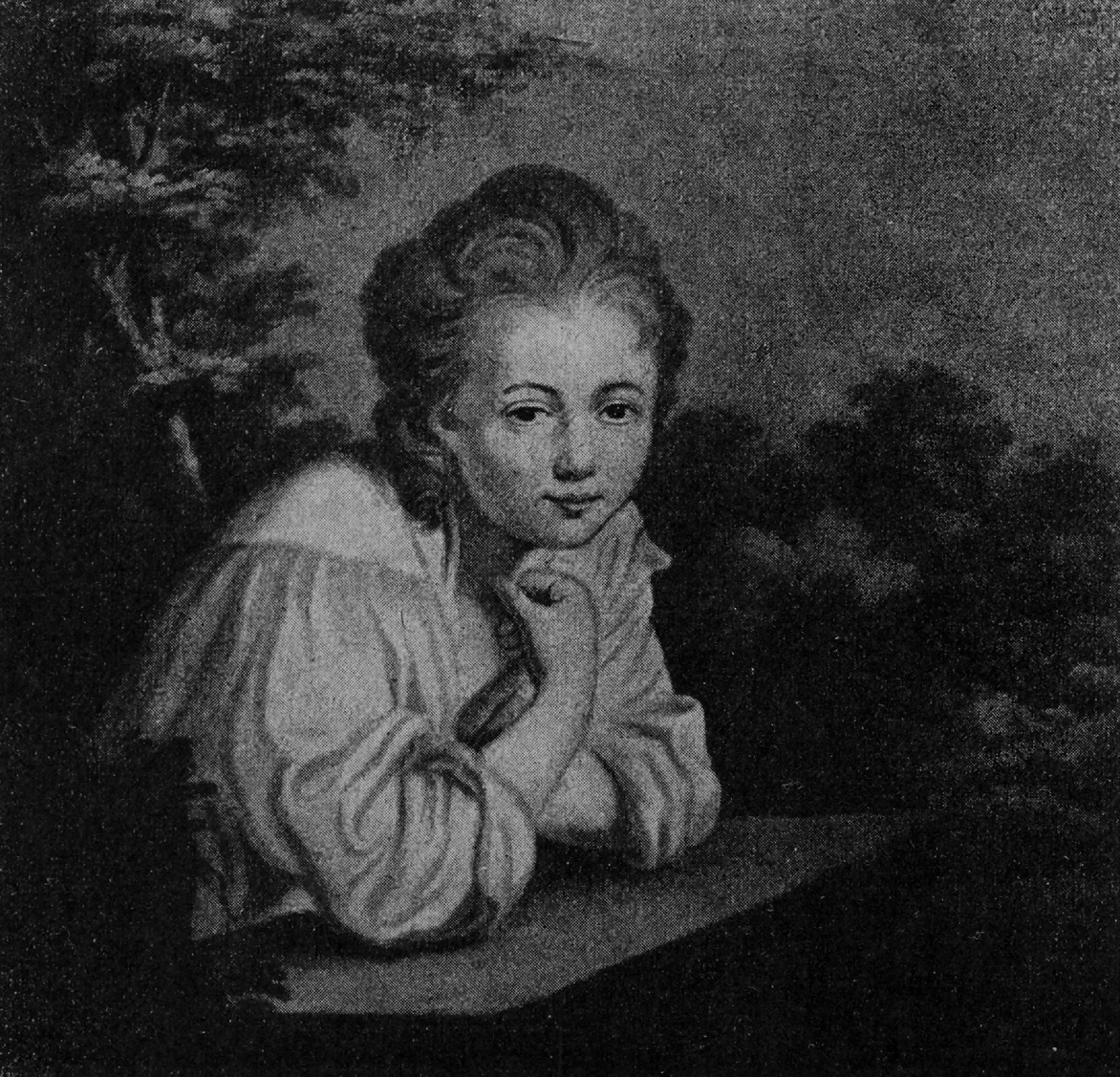
Portrait of Marie-Cunégonde Huin by her father, Charles-Alexis Huin (1785).

Marie-Cunégonde Huin (1767–1840) was a French miniaturist and painter active during the late 18th and early 19th centuries. She studied under Jacques-Louis David and exhibited her works at the Paris Salons from 1796.

== Life ==
Marie-Cunégonde-Odile Huin was born on 4 July 1767 in Strasbourg, the daughter of Charles-Alexis Huin, a pastellist and painter, and Marie-Odile Dorlan. In 1783, the family relocated to Paris, renting a house on the rue d’Angivillers not far from the Louvre.

Huin may have received her first artistic training from her father. After his death in 1786 she studied painting under the Neoclassical master Jacques-Louis David Huin was placed under the supervision of two of David’s advanced pupils, Marie-Élisabeth and Marie-Guillemine Laville-Leroulx, working from their rooms at the Hôtel des Arts in the Faubourg Saint-Martin, while David himself oversaw her progress. David wrote to Huin's mother that "there is no question of a fee; it is a favour I shall request of my students, and I'm certain they will do everything for me".

Around 1805, Huin married Pierre-Antoine Clerc, a lieutenant colonel in the French military engineering corps and a skilled draughtsman. The couple had three daughters, all baptised at Saint-Étienne-du-Mont in Paris at a relatively advanced age.

Marie-Cunégonde Huin later lived in Metz on the rue des Jardins, where she died on 25 September 1840.

== Career ==
Huin worked professionally as a miniaturist under the names Citoyenne Huin and Mademoiselle Huin. In the late 18th century, women’s artistic participation was limited, and miniature painting offered a socially acceptable outlet. The discipline's small scale, technical delicacy, and focus on intimate, personal subjects aligned with contemporary ideas of women’s social roles, while portability and commercial appeal meant that miniature painting was a practical and respected way for women to make money through art.

Huin established her miniature studio in the Marais district of Paris, on the rue Meslay, an address she shared with her father and her uncle Nicolas Huin, a successful glazer. She presented her works at the Salons beginning in 1796.

The Salon catalogues provide little information about her work, as the titles she provided were typically generic, noting only the number or type of miniatures rather than their subjects.

- 1796 – Un cadre renferment des miniatures (A frame containing miniatures)
- 1798 – Un cadre renfermant divers portraits en miniature, une Hébé, etc. (A frame containing various miniature portraits, a Hebe, etc.)
- 1799 – Figure d'étude (Study figure); Portrait d'homme (Portrait of a man)
- 1801 – Six portraits en miniature (Six miniature portraits)
