= Marie Lucas Robiquet =

French painter

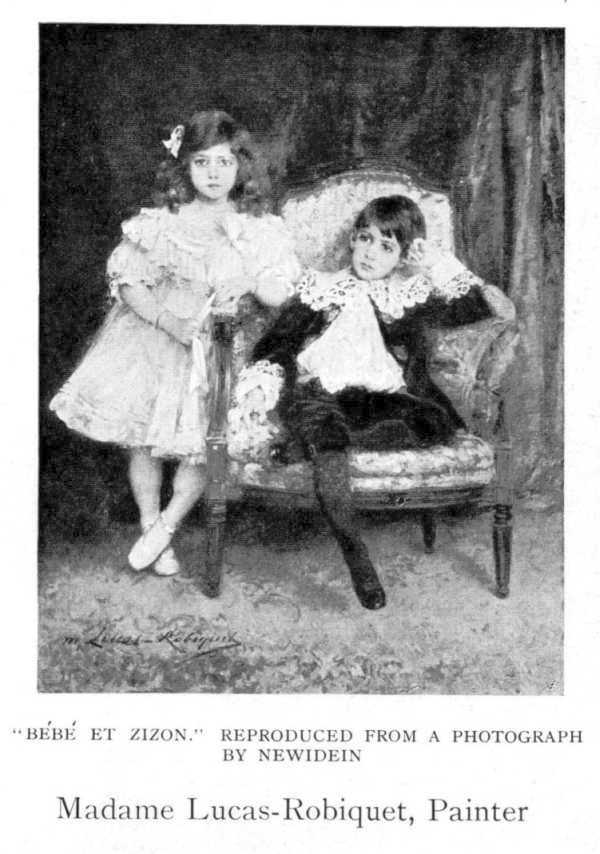
- Marie Lucas Robiquet as a young girl, 1905
- Born: Marie Elisabeth Aimée Lucas-Robiquet; 17 October 1858; Avranches, France
- Died: 21 December 1959 (aged 101); Paris, France
- Known for: Painter
- Movement: Orientalist

Marie Elisabeth Aimée Lucas-Robiquet (17 October 1858 – 21 December 1959) was a French Orientalist artist who worked within the Salon of the Société des Artistes Français.

== Life ==
Lucas-Robiquet was recognized for her paintings of African and Algerian subjects. The 1897 edition of Parisian Illustrated Review cites her outdoor studies for a "wise tendency toward reasonable impressionism" by "an artist of the highest order."

Marie Lucas-Robiquet was a rare example of a female artist, living and working in North Africa, at a time when women were rarely admitted to art academies, and were not encouraged to travel without a chaperone. Her paintings reveal some of the locations where she travelled including Algeria.

Works by Lucas-Robiquet have sold well in the past few years. In the early 21st century, Christie's house sold, at public auction, two of her paintings in the $13,000 to $18,000 range. Another work, Portrait of a boy on a beach, was offered in the $30,000 to $50,000 range by Christie's. Yet another work, Tahedat filant, earned $141,033, far above the auctioneer's estimate, although that was at the height of the market in 2008, before the world-wide recession hit the market for fine art very hard. Several of her Salon paintings were also exhibited recently by Milmo-Penny Fine Art for private sale.

Lucas-Robiquet enjoyed over forty years of artistic recognition within the highly acclaimed Paris Salon de la Société des Artistes Français throughout her lifetime, but after her death her works and legacy faded from public view. A rediscovery and resurgence in popularity of her oeuvre occurred in the early 21st century.

== Academic research ==
Like many other women Orientalists, Lucas-Robiquet has not received adequate art historical attention and the artist's works and her explorations in Northern Africa as a pied noir during the French colonial era set her apart from many women artists of the period. The art historian Mary Healy has carried out original research into the life and work of Lucas-Robiquet.

== See also ==
- List of Orientalist artists
- Orientalism
- Women artists
