= Louise Desbordes =

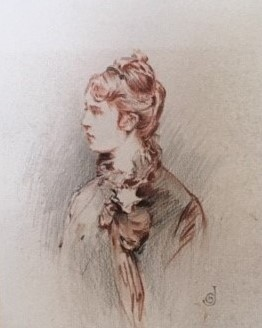
Portrait of Louise Desjordes by Charles Jouas, c. 1895

Louise Alexandrine Desbordes-Jouas (4 February 1848 — 18 August 1926) was a French painter and musician associated with the province of Anjou. She exhibited regularly at salons in France as well as the World's Fair of 1889 and was also active as a professional singer at the Paris Opéra.

== Early life and musical career ==
Desbordes was born on 4 February 1848 in Angers, at rue St-Aubin, to Joséphine-Louise Boutaire and François Desbordes. As a child, she received her first musical instruction from her father, the organist of Angers Cathedral, who taught her the fundamentals of singing. The family moved to Bordeaux, where her father became director of the orchestra of the theatre, before later settling in Paris.

Desbordes undertook formal training in music at the Conservatoire Impérial, and on 2 August 1867, while a student there, she was awarded the first accessit in the Grand Opera competition. Subsequently, she became the first singer of the Emperor's Chapel and performed at the Paris Opéra in several prominent roles from 1868 to 1872, including Martha in Charles Gounod's Faust on 4 March 1869.

== Artistic career ==
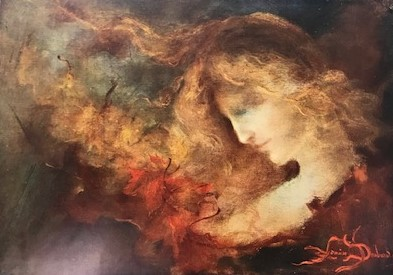
And the Gust Passed That Way by Louise Desbordes

Desbordes later became prominent as a painter, developing a highly personal style characterised by decorative composition, vivid colour, and Symbolist themes. Her first public exhibition dates from 1867 during her time at the Conservatoire, when she showed her work alongside a group of women artists. At this early stage in her career, her Symbolist tendencies were already noted, with comparison drawn to Gustave Moreau. According to an essay by Marc Leclerc, Desbordes approached painting with a musical sensibility, drawing on her formative years in performance, and composing works as with a piece of music.

Desbordes was taught by the Belgian genre painter Alfred Stevens prior to 1876 and became one of his most highly regarded pupils. Her work was praised by contemporary critics such as Joris-Karl Huysmans, who became a close friend and was a witness at her wedding.

Following a salon debut in Antwerp in 1873, Desbordes exhibited regularly at the Paris Salon, as well as at provincial and international exhibitions, including in Ghent, Dijon and Bordeaux. She was a member of the Société des Artistes Angevins, the Femmes Peintres et Sculpteurs, and the Eclectique.

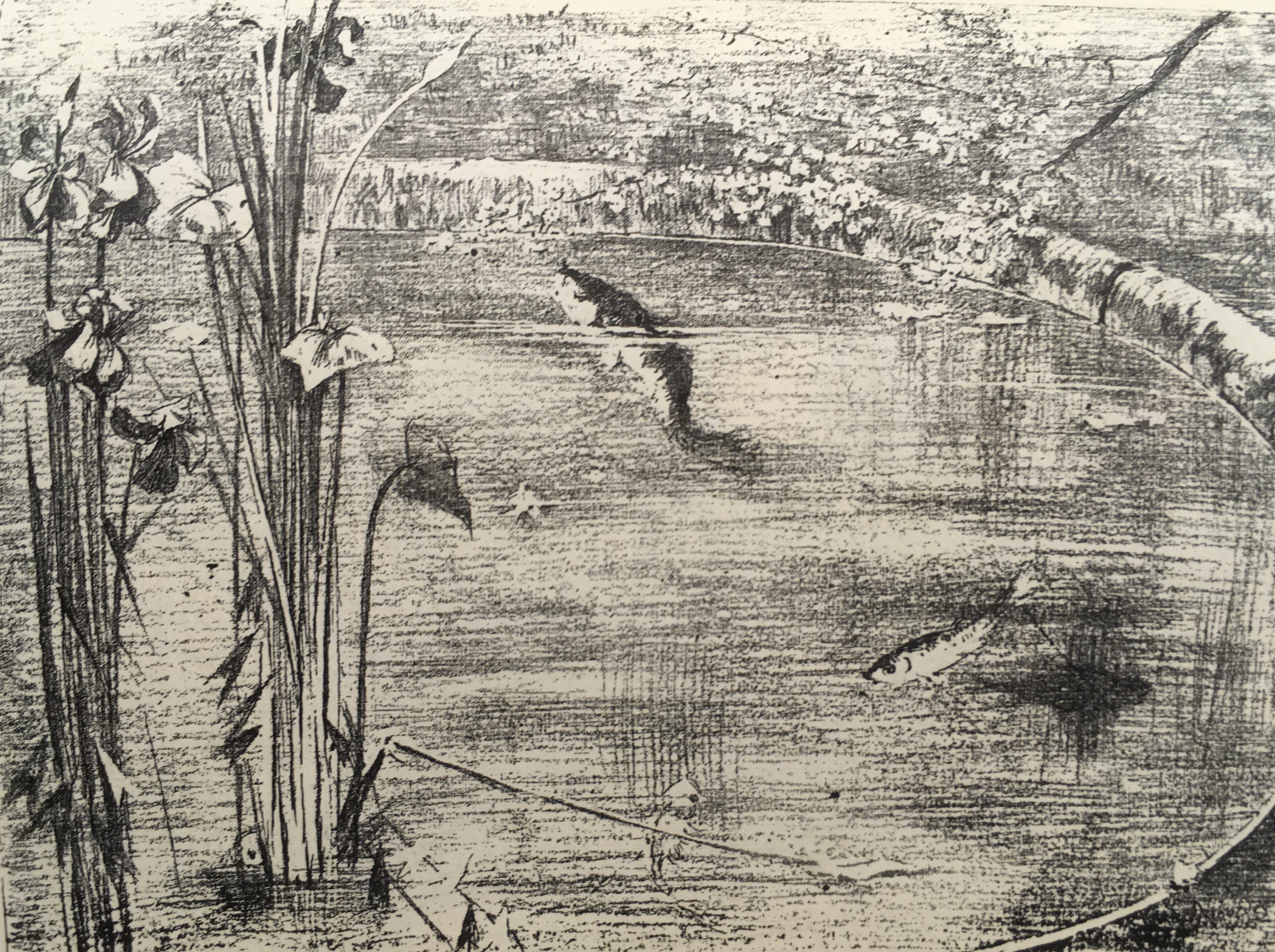
The Fish, etching by Louise Desbordes

== Personal life ==
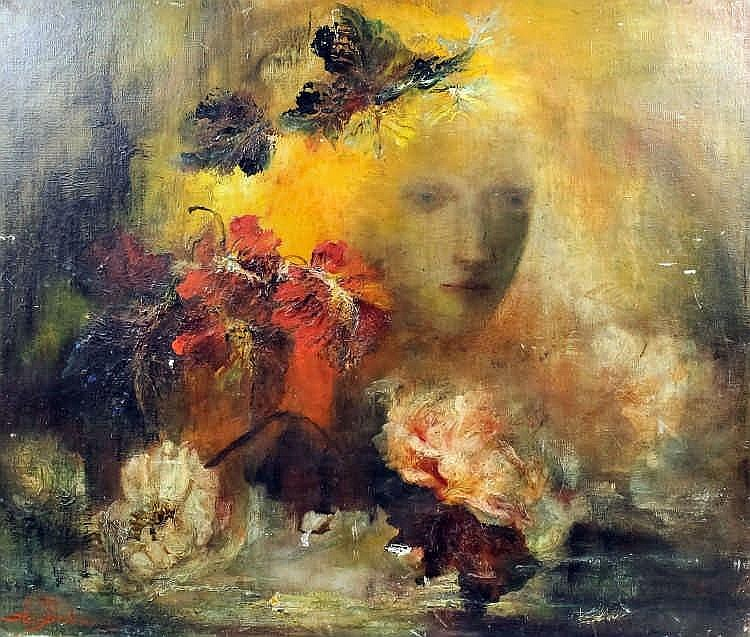
A work by Louise Desbordes

Desbordes married twice, first to the pharmacist Marie Raphaël Grassian in 1884, and later to the French engraver and painter Charles Jouas in 1906.

Although she was based in Paris during much of her career, Desbordes maintained a strong connection to her native Angers, where she had grown up. She was an active member of the Société des artistes angevins and introduced her husband Charles Jouas to the artistic community of Anjou. Two of her paintings are conserved at the Museum of Fine Arts in Anjou.

Desbordes died on 18 August 1926 at her home in Créteil, near Paris, after a long illness.
