= Nina Barka =

French painter

Nina Barka (5 October 1908 – 1986), real name Marie Smirsky, was a prominent naive artist. She was born in Odessa, Russian Empire (now Ukraine) of Ukrainian parents, but moved to France, where she became a French citizen. Her work had many Russian (Slavic) and Byzantine themes.
