= Raymond Wintz =

French painter (1884–1956)

Josept Raymond Wintz (25 March 1884 – 1956) was a Paris-born painter and engraver whose most famous paintings were of marine and coastal views in Brittany. He is best known for his painting The Blue Door, which is still widely available as a poster and print.

== Life ==
Raymond Wintz was born on 25 March 1884. He was the son of the painter Guillaume Wintz (1823–1899) and the husband of the painter Renée Carpentier-Wintz (1913-2003).

Raymond Wintz was trained at the School of Decorative Arts and the National College of Fine Arts in Paris. He was a pupil of Jules Adler at the Ecole Francais and started exhibiting at the Salon des Artistes Francais in 1910.

Raymond Wintz died in 1956 and is buried in Montparnasse Cemetery, Paris.

== Works ==
The best known of Raymond Wintz’s paintings is The Blue Door, which is still sold as a poster and print. It is signed with the year 1927 and the French title, which appears on some older prints, is Un coin du port a Doelan. It contains many of his typical themes and motifs: a partially seen room with an open door to a balcony overlooking a harbour or coastal scene. A vase or plant-pot containing geraniums or hydrangeas often features. A similarly themed painting, The Open Door, was sold in the US as a "Paint it Yourself Art Program" in the 1950s. The information accompanying this states that Wintz painted the scene following a trip to Brittany in 1924 and that it is based on the actual view from a friend’s villa. Brittany was the location for The Blue Door and for most of his landscapes which carry the name of the location and include Camaret and Morning Light at Dalan (Finisterre).

Morning Light at Dalan (Finisterre)

A weekly French newspaper, L'Illustration, featured one of his watercolours, Matinee sur la Baie du Morbihan. In addition, several of his prints were reproduced in the Homelovers Art Review. These include La Vue Tranquille, Blue Harbour (Port Haliguen) Brittany, and Luminosite Marine. Postcards were produced featuring some of his paintings, including Breton Fishing Village and Hydrangeas published by the Medici Society.

The style in which Raymond Wintz painted can be broadly termed ‘realism’, although a slight leaning towards impressionism has been noted. He may have been attracted to the Brittany locations because of the quality of the light, in the same way as a school of painting grew up around Newlyn in Cornwall. He has been called ‘the painter of light’ and his works were described as 'nostalgic' even in the 1950s. To a modern-day audience his paintings may evoke childhood memories of holidays on the coast. The continuing popularity of The Blue Door may be because it typifies the kind of view that people want from their front window.

Paintings attributed to 'Richard Wintz' and 'R. Wints' also appear to be by Raymond Wintz, displaying many of his characteristic motifs and stylistic features. The confusion has possibly arisen because his signature is 'R.Wintz' and 'R. Wints' appears to be a misreading of this. Paintings are most commonly signed in the bottom right hand corner.

His works were exhibited in museums and galleries including the Tattegrain Museum and Petit-Palais in Paris and the Museums of Reims, Laon, Montreal Museum of Fine Arts, Montevideo, and Glasgow, but it is not clear how many remain on show. His paintings are occasionally sold at auction in France and other locations, with most originating from and entering private collections.

In terms of auction records, an oil painting called La Maison Rose (48 x 55 cm) was sold at auction by Bonhams for £2,800 in December 2007. The highest recorded price may be 13,200 euros obtained for Port a l'ile d'Yeu, a large (165 x 195 cm) oil painting sold by Chayette-Cheval in France in December 2004.

== Awards ==
Among the awards and distinctions he held were:

- 1911 – Membership of the Salon
- 1922 – Silver Medal, Salon
- 1924 – Officer of the Academy; Gold Medal and Corot Prize, Salon
- President of the Salon
- President of the Society of French Landscape Artists
- Knight of the Order of the Legion of Honour
- President of the Jury of the Salon
