= Odette Pauvert =

French painter

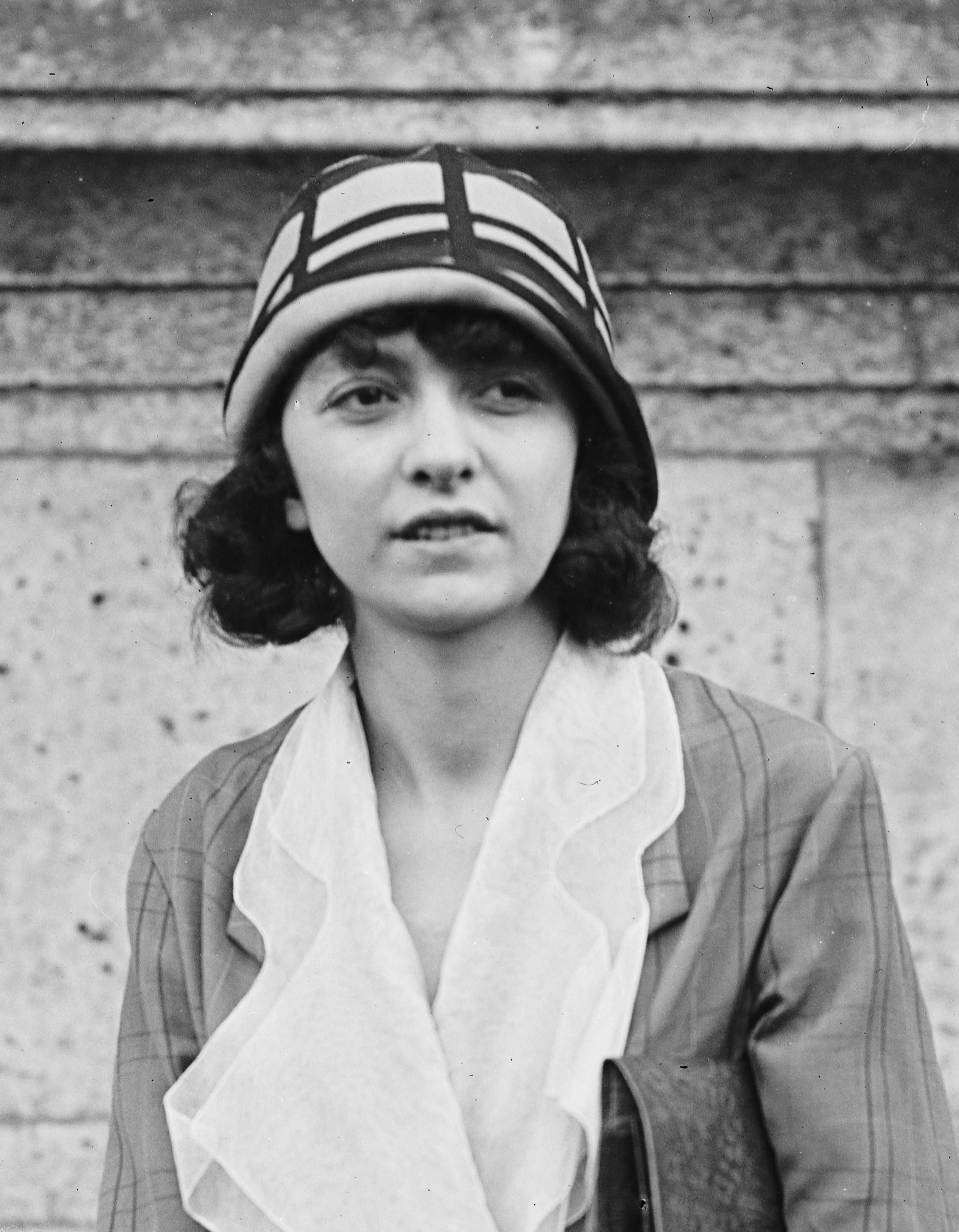
Odette Pauvert (1925)

Odette-Marie Pauvert (10 November 1903, Paris — 26 May 1966, Paris) was a French painter. The daughter of two painters, she was first trained by her mother before studying at the École des Beaux-Arts. After awards from the Paris Salon, she went on to become the first woman painter to win the Grand Prix de Rome in 1925. She participated in decorating several pavilions for the 1937 French Art Exposition. A retrospective of her work was held in 1986 at the Musée Sainte-Croix in Poitiers.

== Early life and education ==
Born in Paris on 18 November 1903, Odette-Marie Pauvert was the daughter of the miniature painter Henri Pauvert (1854–1951) and his wife the painter Louise née Cochet (1870–1950). Her sister Marguerite-Louise (1902–83) was also a painter. Initially instructed by her mother, Pauvert studied from 1921 at the École des Beaux-Art under Ferdinand Hubert and Émile Renard.

== Career ==
Pauvert's paintings earned her a number of early awards. In 1922, she received the Jauvin d’Attainville prize for Solitude and in 1923 she won the silver medal at the Salon. In 1925, she became the first woman painter to be awarded the Grand Prix de Rome for L'egende de Saint Ronan. As a result, she stayed at the Villa Médicis in Rome from 1926 to 1929 where she created numerous works. In 1927, she painted a group portrait titled Promotion 1926 depicting herself together with the musician Louis Fourestier, the sculptor Évariste Jonchère and the architect Alfred Audoui.

After returning to France, she created a number of religious works including a fresco La Mère et l'enfant (1933) for the elementary school on rue Jomard in Paris after winning a competition. She went on to decorate several pavilions for the 1937 French Art Exposition.

Odette Pauvert died in Paris on 26 March 1966. A retrospective of her work was held in 1986 at the Musée Sainte-Croix in Poitiers.
