= Hélène Elizaga =

Marie Lucie Hélène Elissague, more widely known as Hélène Elizaga or simply Elizaga, (3 March 1896, Bagnères-de-Bigorre — 25 September 1981, Saint-Jean-de-Luz) was a French Basque painter. In addition to studying at the Académie Julian, she was a pupil of Henry du Sorbiers de La Tourasse whom she married in 1918. She is remembered for her brightly illuminated landscapes, portraits and genre scenes from the Basque country. Several of her works are in the collection of Bayonne's Musée Basque.

== Early life ==
Born on 3 March 1896 in Bagnères-de-Bigorre, Hélène Marie Lucie Elissague was the daughter of the pharmacist Charlies Elissague (1860–1930) and his wife Marie Stéphanie née Lairac (1865–1923). After receiving instruction in painting from Charles Colin and from her husband-to-be the portraitist Henry du Sorbiers de La Tourasse (married 1918), in 1917 she attended the Académie Julien and la Grande Chaumière.

== Career ==
Together with her husband, she restored paintings while creating works of her own. In addition to portraits of local celebrities, her paintings depict topics from the Basque country, including brightly illuminated landscapes, pelota players, fishing ports and views of Saint-Jean-de-Luz and Ciboure. She also created genre works such as Trois joueurs de chistera, sur fonds de montagne and scenes from Spain Pueblo de Aragón. Sometimes evoking Cubism, her works exhibit strength and an excellent appreciation of colour. From the 1950s, unable to make a living from her creations, together with her husband she devoted her time mainly to restoring paintings.

She befriended many other artists, including Ramiro Arrue who in 1932 helped her become a member of the Association of Basque Artists, based in Bayonne. She was the only woman member.

Hêlène Elizaga died in Saint-Jean-de-Luz on 25 September 1981. Several of her works can be seen in the Musée Basque, Bayonne.
