= Augustine Dallemagne =

French painter (1821–1875)

- Born: Virginie Polyxène Augustine Philippe Decagny; 1821
- Died: 1875 (aged 53–54)
- Known for: Painting
- Spouse: Adolphe Dallemagne

Virginie Polyxène Augustine Philippe Dallemagne, a French miniature painter, whose maiden name was Decagny, was a native of Beauvais. She was a pupil of Madame de Mirbel, and showed much talent in the execution of portraits in miniature and in crayons. She married Adolphe Dallemagne, a landscape painter, and died at Corbeil in 1876.
