= Renée Carpentier-Wintz =

French painter

- Born: Renée Carpentier; 1913; Amiens, France
- Died: 2003 (aged 89–90); Paris, France
- Known for: Painting
- Movement: Landscapes
- Spouse(s): Raymond Wintz, Jean Bussy
- Awards: Corot prize (1952)

Renée Carpentier-Wintz (1913–2003) was a French painter. She was the wife of French artist Raymond Wintz. Like her husband, she was famous for her beautiful Brittany landscapes.
