= Afi Nayo =

French artist of Togolese origin (born 1969)

Afi Nayo (born 1969) is a French artist of Togolese origin.

Nayo is a native of Lomé, but moved with her family to Paris early in life; she continues to live and work in that city. After studies at the École nationale supérieure des beaux-arts she began her career as a sculptor, later turning to painting as well. She has shown work throughout Europe and Africa as well as in New York, and was featured in Revue Noire several times during the later 1990s. Her work is concerned with themes of spirituality and cultural interconnectedness. A 2007 work by Nayo, Love Suite I, in pyrogravure and mixed media on board, is currently owned by the National Museum of African Art.
