= Sophie Lienard =

French painter

- Born: August 5, 1800
- Died: May 4, 1875 (aged 74)
- Known for: Portrait miniatures

Sophie Lienard (1800–1875) was a French portrait artist who specialized in miniatures. She was active as an artist from 1837 until 1845. She worked and lived in Paris. Between 1842 and 1845, she exhibited at the Salon in Paris.

During her lifetime, she painted portraits of Queen Victoria, Jérôme Bonaparte and Louis Philippe I.

== Notable collections ==
- Noble con abrigo negro (Noble with a black coat), ca. 1845, Museum of Romanticism, Madrid

== Gallery ==
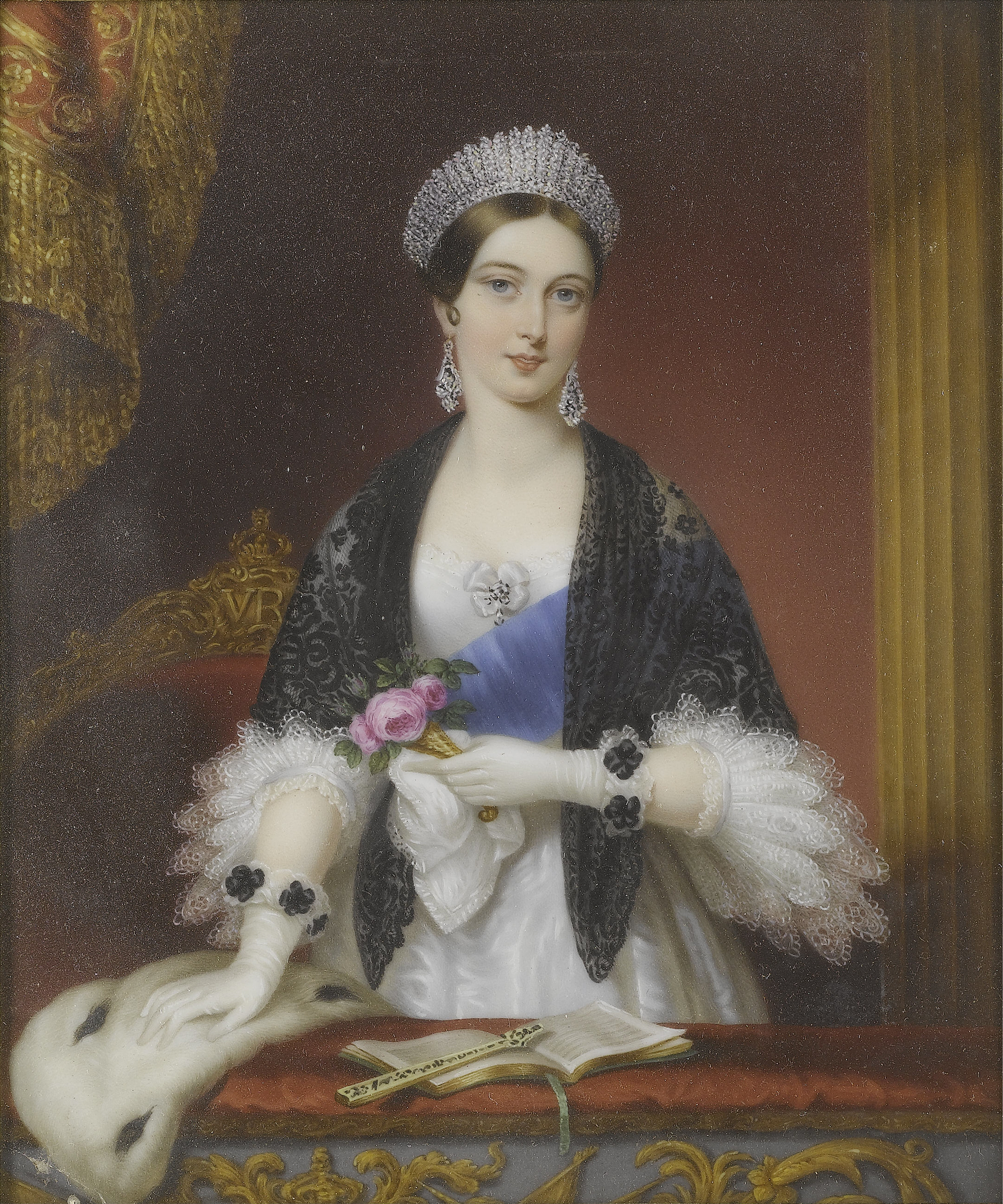
Queen Victoria standing in the Royal Box at the Drury Lane Theatre, 1837

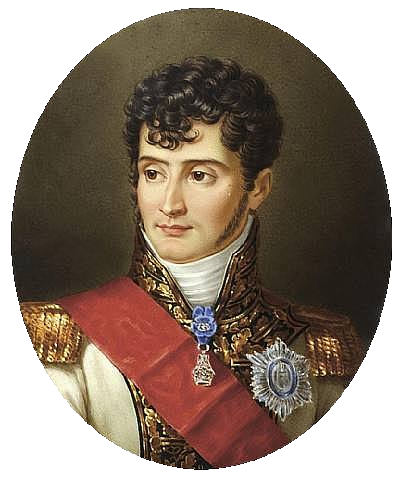
Jérôme Bonaparte, before 1845

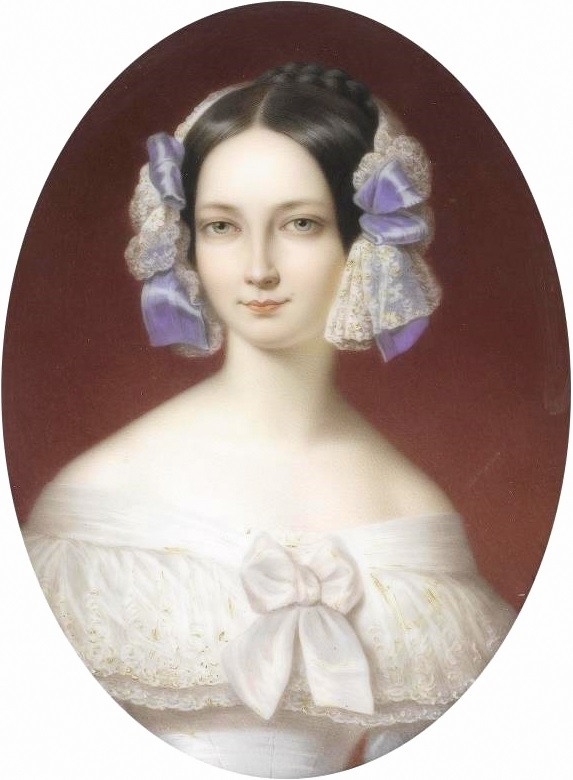
Princess Hélène-Louise-Elisabeth of Mecklenburg-Schwerin (1814-1858), Duchesse d'Orléans, before 1845
