= James Hopwood =

James Hopwood may refer to:

- James Hopwood the Elder (1740s or 50s–1819), British engraver
- James Hopwood the Younger (c. 1800–c. 1850), British engraver
- James Avery Hopwood (1882–1928), American playwright

== See also ==
- James Hopwood Jeans (1877–1946), English physicist, astronomer and mathematician
