= Toulon Opera =

French opera house

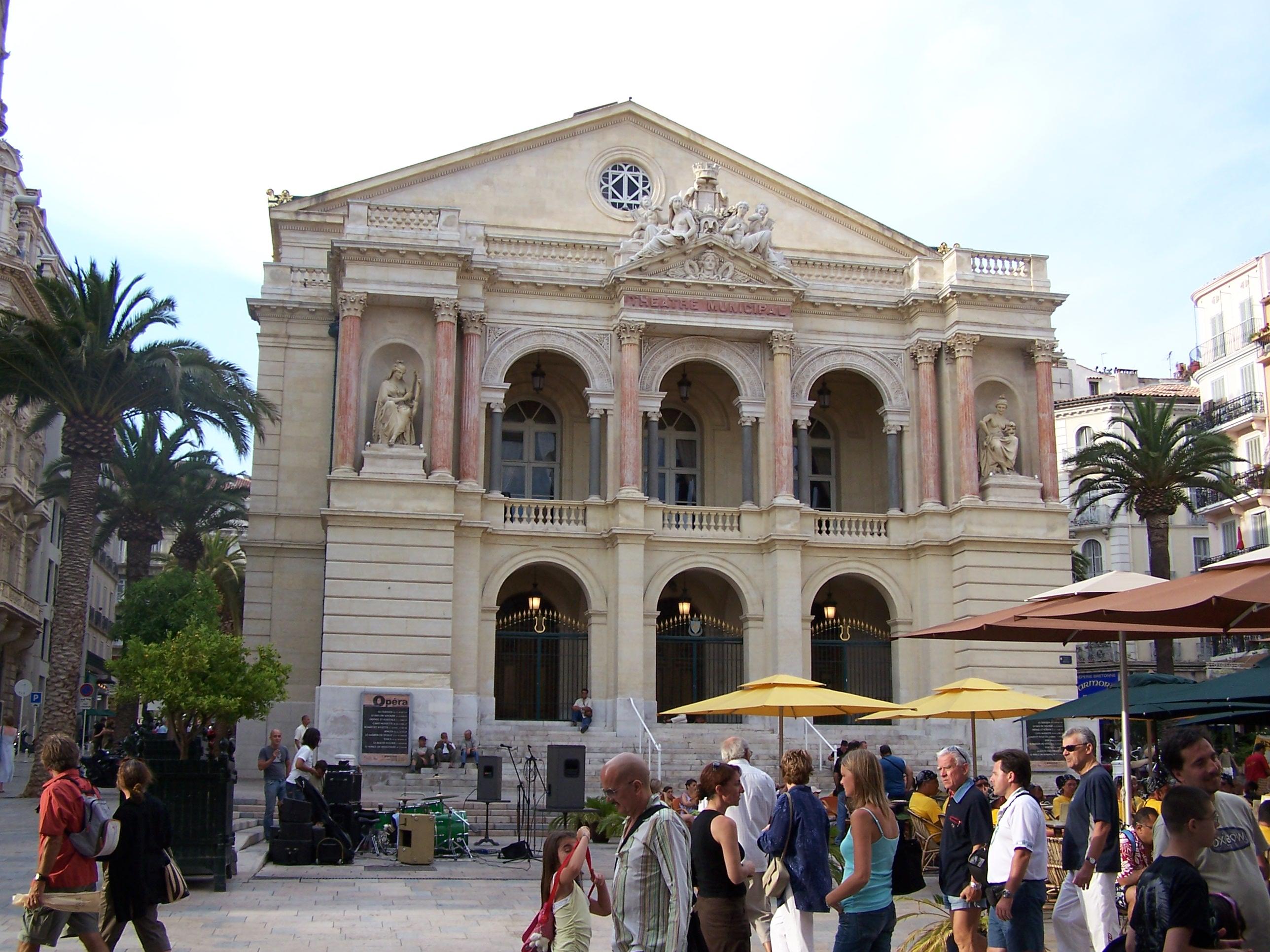
Opéra de Toulon

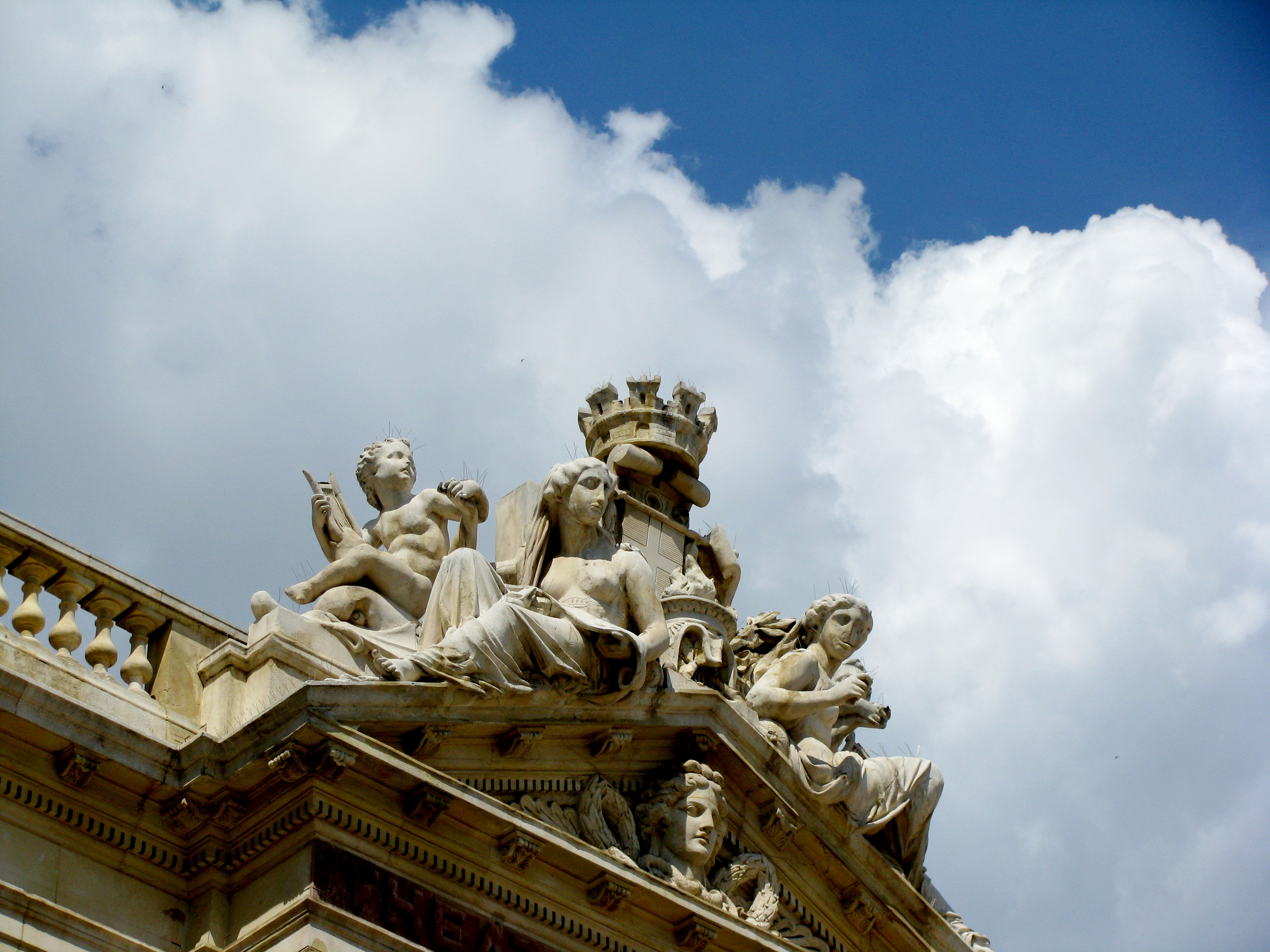
The sculptures on top of the Toulon Opera

The Toulon Opera (French: Opéra de Toulon; Occitan: Opèra de Tolon or Operà) is an opera house located in Toulon, France. The second-largest opera house in France after the Palais Garnier in Paris, it opened thirteen years before the Garnier. It is currently the home of the Opéra Toulon Provence Méditerranée, under the direction of Jérôme Brunetière. The opera company performs about eight operas a season in the opera houses of Toulon, Avignon, Nice and Marseille.

The house seats 1,797 people on five levels. The theatre sits on 2,000 square metres of foundation and has a stage width of 22 metres 80 centimetres and a depth of 12 metres (39 ft). The permanent opera staff consists of over 200 people.

== History ==
The Toulon Opera House (Fr: Le Grand Theâtre de Toulon) was one of a wave of lyric opera houses built in France and Europe in the middle of the 19th century, and it represented the exuberant style of the Second Empire. Its construction began on 5 March 1860, two years before the start of construction of the Palais Garnier. The designer was Léon Feuchère, who had renovated the Marseille Opera House and built the opera house in Avignon. He died in 1857, and the work was finished by Paris architects Charpentier, pére et fils. The 15-meter canvas on the ceiling was painted and its plaster ornament designed by Louis Duveau, who also created the ceiling of the Grand Salon of the Imperial Apartments in the Napoleon Wing of the Louvre.

The house was inaugurated on 1 October 1862, with Les Mousquetaires de la reine, a comic opera by Fromental Halévy, followed a few days later by La Juive, Halévy's most famous opera. The opera house was the setting for the French film La Malédiction de Belphégor (The Curse of Belphegor), by Georges Combret, in 1966.

Past music directors of the company have included Giuliano Carella (2003–2018) and Jurjen Hempel (2018–2021). In June 2021, the company announced the appointments of Marzena Diakun and Valerio Galli as co-principal conductors of the company, effective 1 September 2021.
