= Claude Ferdinand Gaillard =

French engraver and painter (1834–1887)

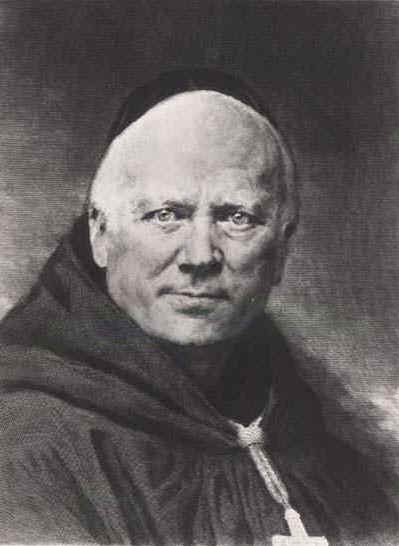
Prosper Guéranger; print by Gaillard (c.1875)

Claude Ferdinand Gaillard (7 January 1834 – 19 January 1887) was a French engraver and painter, who had been born and died in Paris.

== Biography ==
His early studies were probably with James Hopwood and Lecouturier; but his chief master was Leon Cogniet, with whom he began engraving in 1850. In this year, he entered the École des Beaux-Arts. At first he had to engrave fashion-plates to make money enough to live, but his application to his art brought him the Prix de Rome for engraving, in 1856. At his first public showing in 1860, his prints were called laboured, soft, and flaccid, more like Drypoint etchings than burin work, and he was advised to adhere to the established rules of his art. Gaillard had already chosen a new method, and his work was a shock, because not done according to the formulae of that day. He was such an innovator that in 1863 he was among the "Salon des Refusés", but in their exhibition his portrait of Bellini was hailed by Philippe Burty as the work of a master, "who engraved with religious care and showed a high classical talent". Gaillard's new manner was to engrave with soft, delicate lines, drawn closely together but not crossing, and to render every fold, wrinkle, or mark on the skin with care. Henceforth Gaillard was represented by engravings and paintings at every Salon. He was best known for his L'Homme à l'Oeillet, completed in eight days, which brought him only $100.

He was the teacher of François-Eugène Burney.

His portraits of Pius IX and Leo XIII raised "the insubordinate scholar" to the rank of the reportedly the most celebrated engraver of his day. Another plate is the St. Sebastian, and there is a portrait of Prosper Guéranger. "My aim", he said, "is not to charm, but to be true; my art is to say all." Gaillard was decorated in 1876, became officer of the Légion d'honneur in 1886, and President of the Société des Graveurs au Burin in 1886. Just before his death the government ordered him to engrave Leonardo da Vinci's Last Supper and Mona Lisa.

== Sources ==
- Images at the Cleveland Museum of Art
