= Portrait of Nicolas Joseph Maison =

Painting by Léon Cogniet

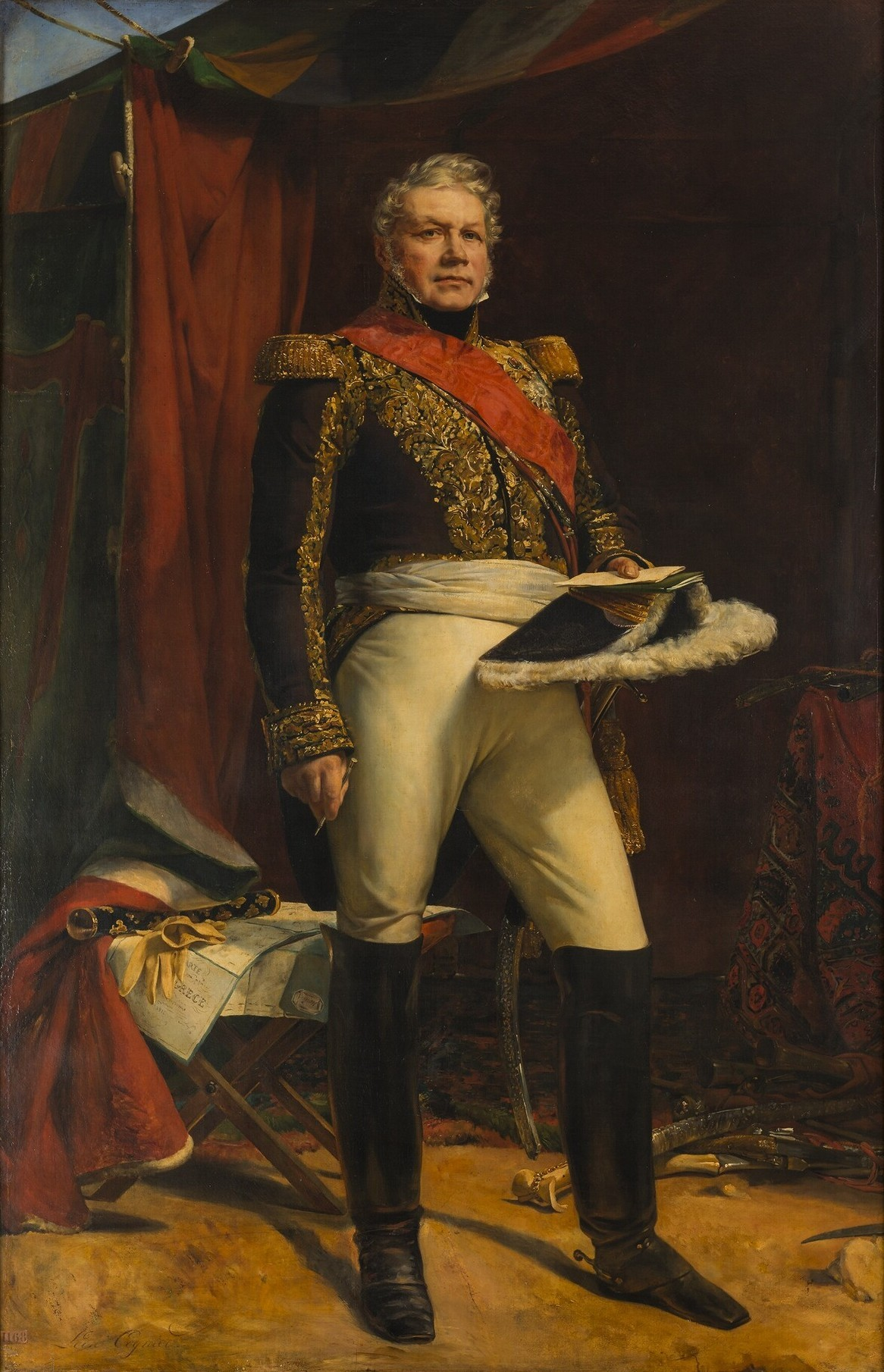
- Artist: Léon Cogniet
- Year: 1835
- Type: Oil on canvas, portrait painting
- Dimensions: 214 cm × 140 cm (84 in × 55 in)
- Location: Palace of Versailles; Versailles

Portrait of Nicolas Joseph Maison is an 1835 portrait painting by the French artist Léon Cogniet. It depicts the French general Nicolas Joseph Maison. A veteran of the Napoleonic Wars, he is best known for commanding the French Expedition to Morea of 1828 during the Greek War of Independence. He was made a Marshal of France in 1829. He later briefly served as both Foreign Minister and Minister of War during the July Monarchy.

Cogniet was a noted artist of the Romantic movement although he also incorporated Neoclassical influences in his work. The painting was commissioned for 1200 francs by the French state to hang in the new Musée de l'Histoire de France at the Palace of Versailles.

== Bibliography ==
- Constans, Claire. La Grèce en révolte: Delacroix et les peintres français, 1815-1848. Réunion des musées nationaux, 1996.
- Moinet, Eric. Le temps des passions: Collections romantiques des musées d'Orléans. Musée des beaux-arts d'Orléans, 1997.
