= Marie-Abraham Rosalbin de Buncey =

French painter

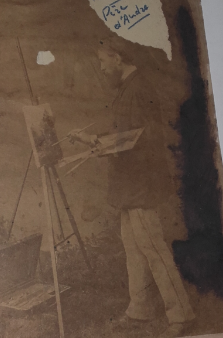
- Born: Marie-Abraham Rosalbin Fortier de Buncey; 26 March 1833; Châtillon-sur-Marne, France
- Died: 19 January 1891 (aged 57); Paris
- Known for: painter

Marie-Abraham Rosalbin de Buncey was a French 19th-century landscape, allegorical and figure painter.

== Biography ==
Marie-Abraham Rosalbin de Buncey was born in 1833 in Chatillon-sur-Marne, France. He studied at the École des Beaux-Arts in Paris under Léon Cogniet. He exhibited his works at the Salon de Paris in 1879. The painter died in Paris in 1891. Marie-Abraham Rosalbin de Buncey is famous for his dark forest landscapes combined with bright clearings and bathing nude women and/or Venus in the style of Narcisse Virgilio Díaz.

== Artworks in public collections ==
- Musée des Beaux-Arts de Chambéry : "Étude de moutons au jardin des plantes"
- Montpellier Museum : "Le Cabaret de la Glacière à Saint-Ouen"
- Pontoise Museum : "Le départ" (the departure)
- Le Puy-en-Velay (Musée Crozatier) : "Femmes nues dans un paysage" (nude in a landscape)
- Reims Museum : "Le Parc Monceau"
- Sceaux (Musée de l'Île-de-France) : "Moulin de Bagnolet près St Gervais" (drawing)
