= Scenes of July 1830 =

Painting by Léon Cogniet

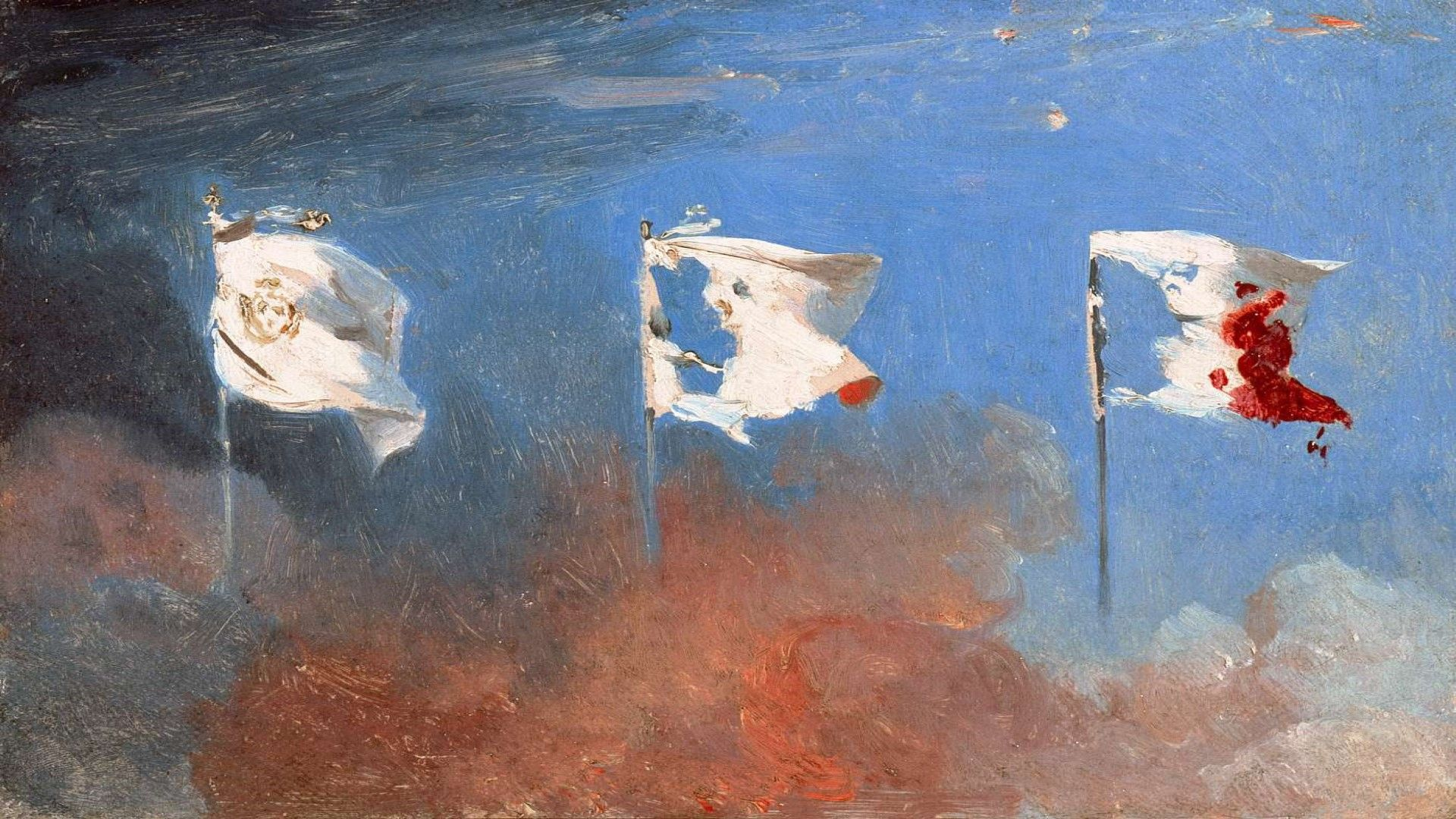
- Artist: Léon Cogniet
- Year: 1830
- Type: Oil on canvas
- Dimensions: 19 cm × 24 cm (7.5 in × 9.4 in)
- Location: Musée des Beaux-Arts; Orléans

Scenes of July 1830 (French: Scène de Juillet 1830) is an oil painting by the French artist Léon Cogniet, from 1830. Today the painting is in the collection of the Musée des Beaux-Arts, in Orléans.

== History and description ==
It symbolically depicts the July Revolution of 1830 which led to the downfall of Charles X and the House of Bourbon. Cogniet uses three flags to demonstrate the overthrow of the government. On the left is the Royalist banner featuring fleur-de-lis on a white background. On the second the royalist emblem of the flag has been shot away, leaving the blue sky gaping behind it. In the third the right portion of the flag is soaked in the blood of the martyrs of the revolution, giving it the appearance of the French tricolour. The flags symbolically represent the changing of regimens and the lives lost in several revolutions. It is also known by the alternative title Les Drapeaux.

The tricolour was strongly associated with the French Revolution and the Napoleonic era and had been suppressed during the Restoration period. The new July Monarchy of Louis Philippe I adopted the tricolour as the national flag once more.

Although a number of paintings of the July Revolution were displayed at the Salon of 1831 in Paris, this was not amongst them.

== Bibliography ==
- Brown, Marilyn R. The Gamin de Paris in Nineteenth-Century Visual Culture: Delacroix, Hugo, and the French Social Imaginary. Taylor & Francis, 2017.
- Fortescue, William. France and 1848: The End of Monarchy. Psychology Press, 2005.
- Pastoureau, Michel. Red: The History of a Color. Princeton University Press, 2017.
