= Charles Sellier (painter) =

French painter (1830–1882)

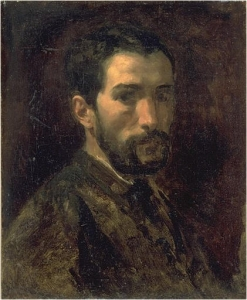
Charles Sellier. Portrait by Jean-Baptiste Carpeaux (c.1864)

Charles-Auguste Sellier or, according to some sources, Charles-François Sellier (23 December 1830 – 23 November 1882) was a French painter who specialized in mythological and historical subjects. Although not well-known during his lifetime, some of his works are considered to be precursors of Art Nouveau.

== Biography ==
He was born in Nancy. His father was a gardener. After being apprenticed to a house-painter, he was enrolled at the "École des beaux-arts de Nancy" from 1846 to 1852, where he studied with Louis Leborne (1796-1865), who arranged for him to continue his artistic education with a municipal grant. At the same time, from 1849 to 1851, he took courses in anatomy at the "École Préparatoire de Médecine de Nancy".

In 1852, he moved to Paris, where he found a position in the workshops of Léon Coignet and, later that year, entered the École des Beaux-Arts. Two years later, he made his first attempt at the Prix de Rome with a canvas depicting Abraham washing the feet of the three angels. In 1857, he exhibited for the first time at the Salon, and won the Prix de Rome with his depiction of the resurrection of Lazarus. Sellier's painting of Lazarus Raised from the Dead was a controversial winner, as its deep chairoscuro was contrary to the academic tradition; the critic Paul Mantz termed it "a most strange phantasmagoria" and detected the influence of Rembrandt.

From 1858 to 1863, Sellier studied in Rome at the French Academy, but made few friends and found that his work was not appreciated by Jean-Victor Schnetz, the Director.

Normally very shy and reserved, he withdrew further into himself after his mother and father died within a few months of each other in 1863. After a brief stay in Paris, painting portraits, he bought back the family home and returned to Nancy in 1864, where he served as Director of the "École de Peinture et de Dessin" from 1866 to 1871. He died after a long illness.

He bequeathed most of his works to the city of Nancy. They are now on display at the Museum of Fine Arts and the Musée de l'École. Streets have been named after him in Nancy and Houdemont.

== Selected paintings ==
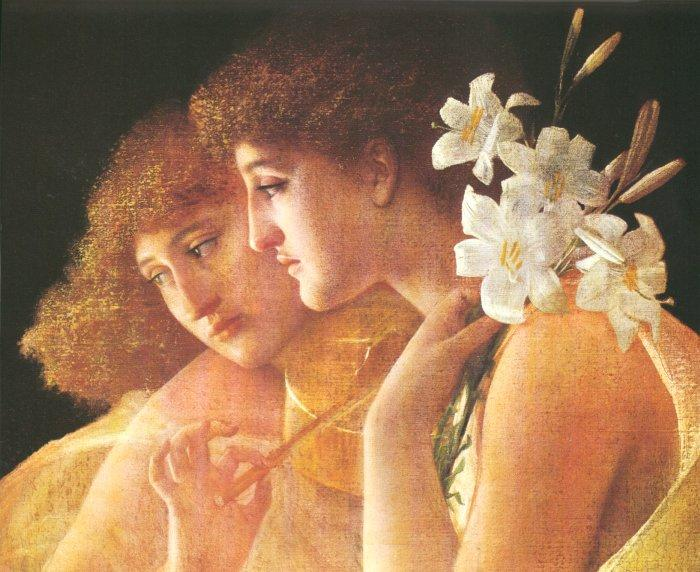
Two Angels (c.1870)

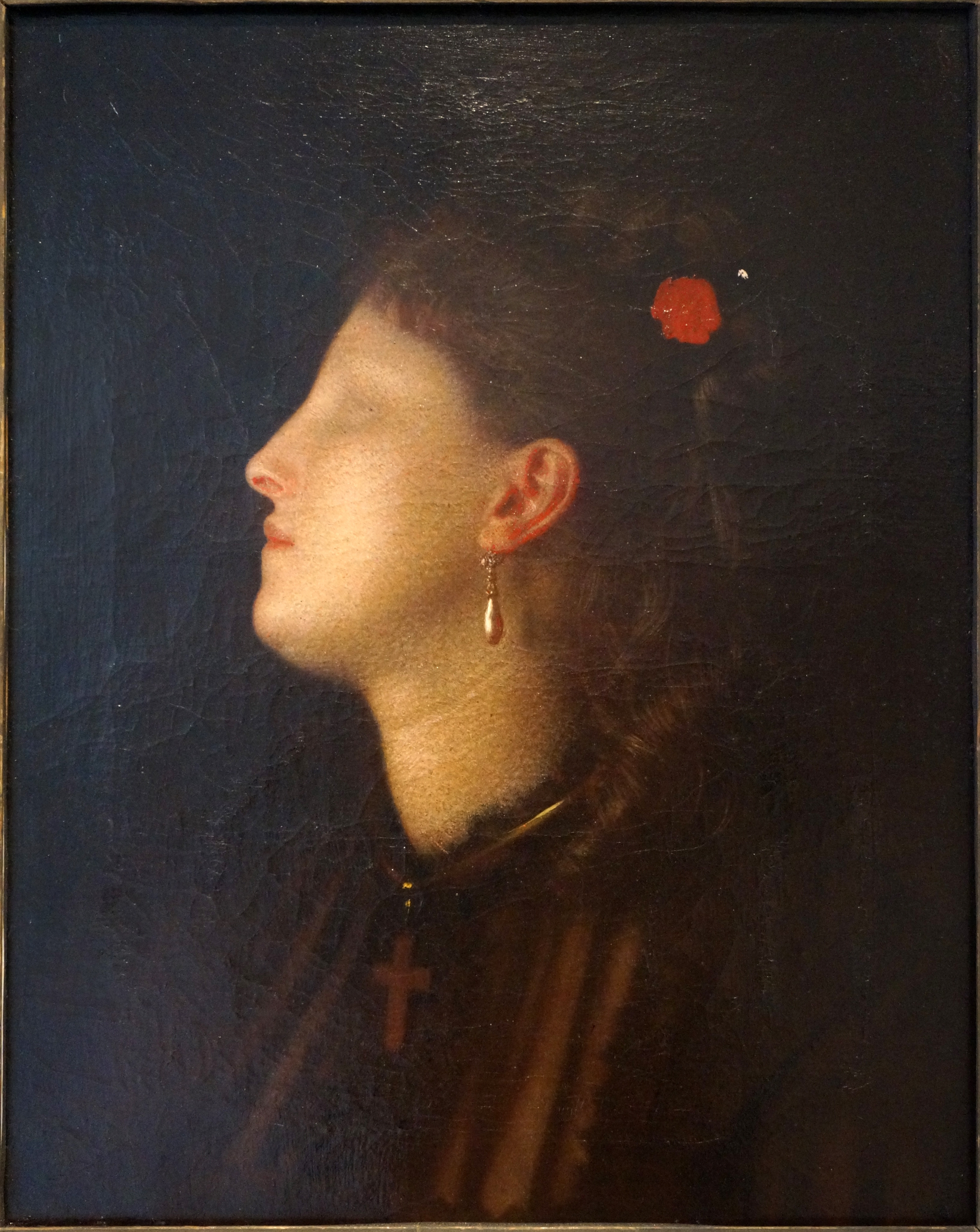
Woman with Pearl (1875)

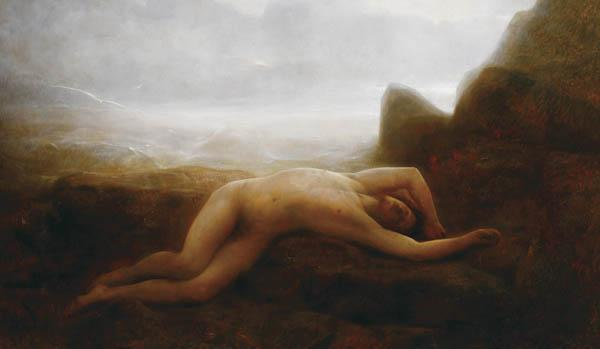
Leander

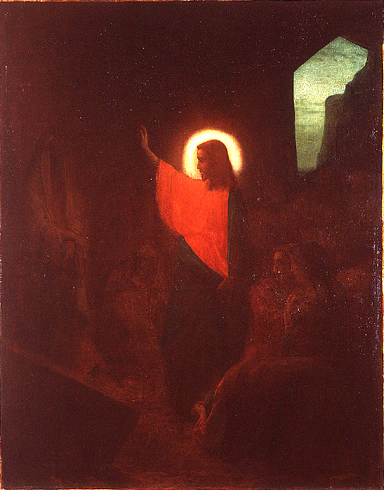
Lazarus Raised from the Dead (1857)
