= The Italian Brigand's Wife =

Painting by Léon Cogniet

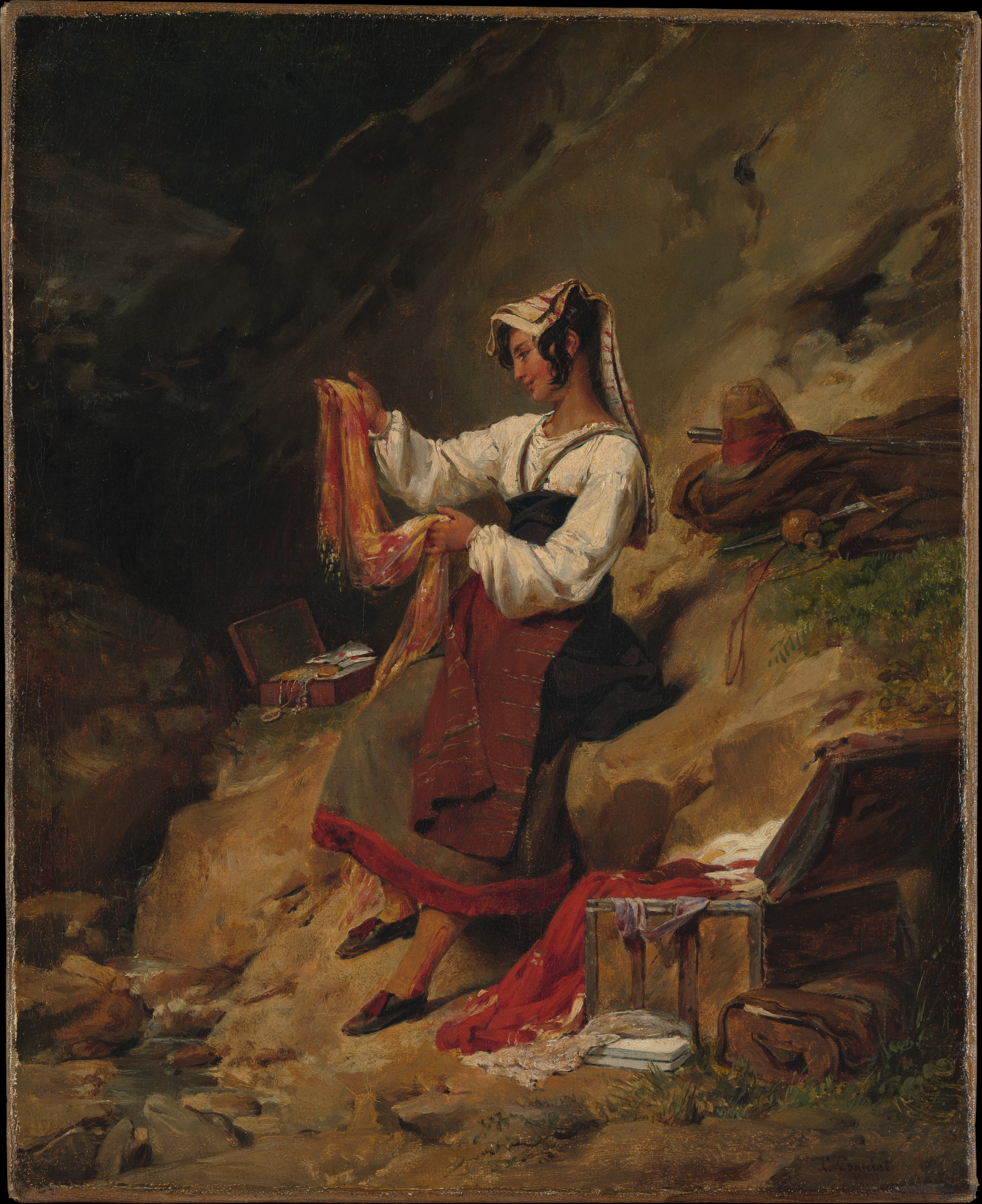
- Artist: Léon Cogniet
- Year: 1825–26
- Type: Oil on canvas, genre painting
- Dimensions: 25.1 cm × 20.6 cm (9.9 in × 8.1 in)
- Location: Metropolitan Museum of Art; New York

The Italian Brigand's Wife is an oil on canvas genre painting by the French artist Léon Cogniet, from 1826.

== History and description ==
It depicts the wife of a brigand in the hills of Southern Italy, examining the plundered goods of a traveller including a length of silk which she holds up for inspection. Depictions of Italian outlaws were a common theme in romantic art of the era. Cogniet produced it as a pendant piece for a painting by his friend Achille-Etna Michallon depicting a brigand chief.

Cogniet produced three versions of the painting during 1825 to 1826, possibly anticipating exhibiting one at the Salon of 1827. One of them is now in the collection of the Metropolitan Museum of Art, in New York.

== See also ==
- Italian Brigands Surprised by Papal Troops, an 1831 painting by Horace Vernet

== Bibliography ==
- Miller, Asher Ethan. The Path of Nature: French Paintings from the Wheelock Whitney Collection 1785-1850. Metropolitan Museum of Art, 2013.
- Wrigley, Richard (ed.) Regarding Romantic Rome. Peter Lang, 2007.
