= Marie Amélie Cogniet =

French painter

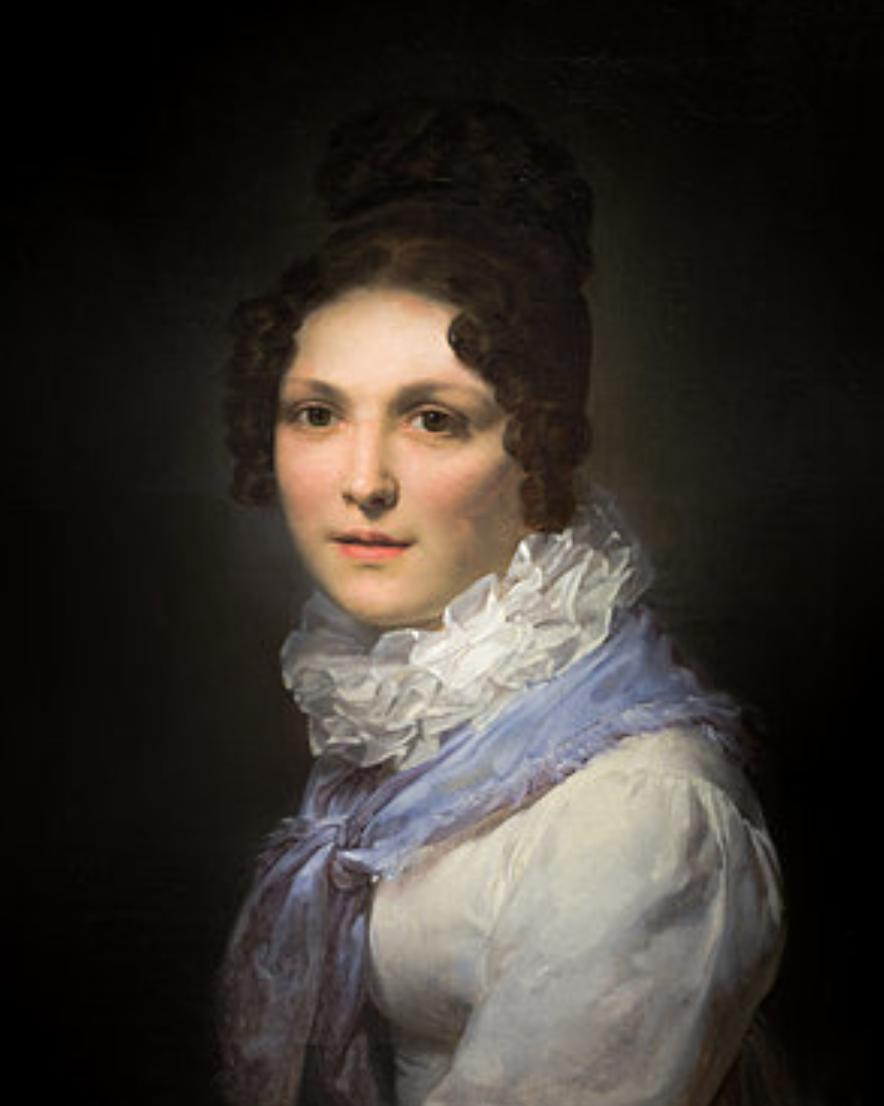
- Portrait of Marie Amélie Cogniet by her brother Léon Cogniet, 1817-1818 (musée des beaux-arts d'Orléans)
- Born: 5 April 1798; Paris, France
- Died: 29 April 1869 (aged 71); Paris, France
- Known for: Portrait painting

Marie-Amélie Cogniet (English: /kɒnˈjɛ/ kon-YEH, French: [maʁi ameli kɔɲɛ]; 5 April 1798 – 29 April 1869) was a French painter and the sister of Léon Cogniet.

== Life and work ==
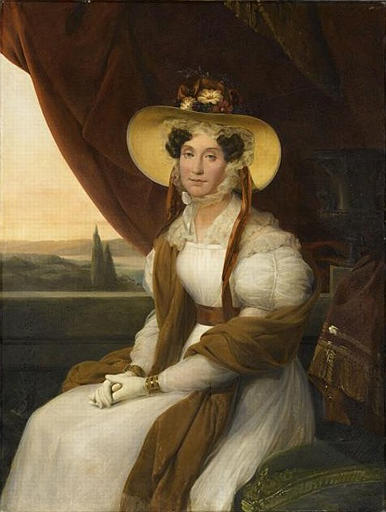
Portrait of Adélaide d'Orléans

Cogniet was born in Paris, France, as the sister of the painter and art teacher Léon Cogniet, whose works she copied. She specialized in portraiture and showed works at the Paris Salon from 1831.

Her copy of her brother's painting Portrait of Adélaide d'Orléans, then located at Chantilly, was included in the 1905 book Women Painters of the World.

Cogniet died in Paris.
