= Léon Cogniet =

French painter (1794–1880)

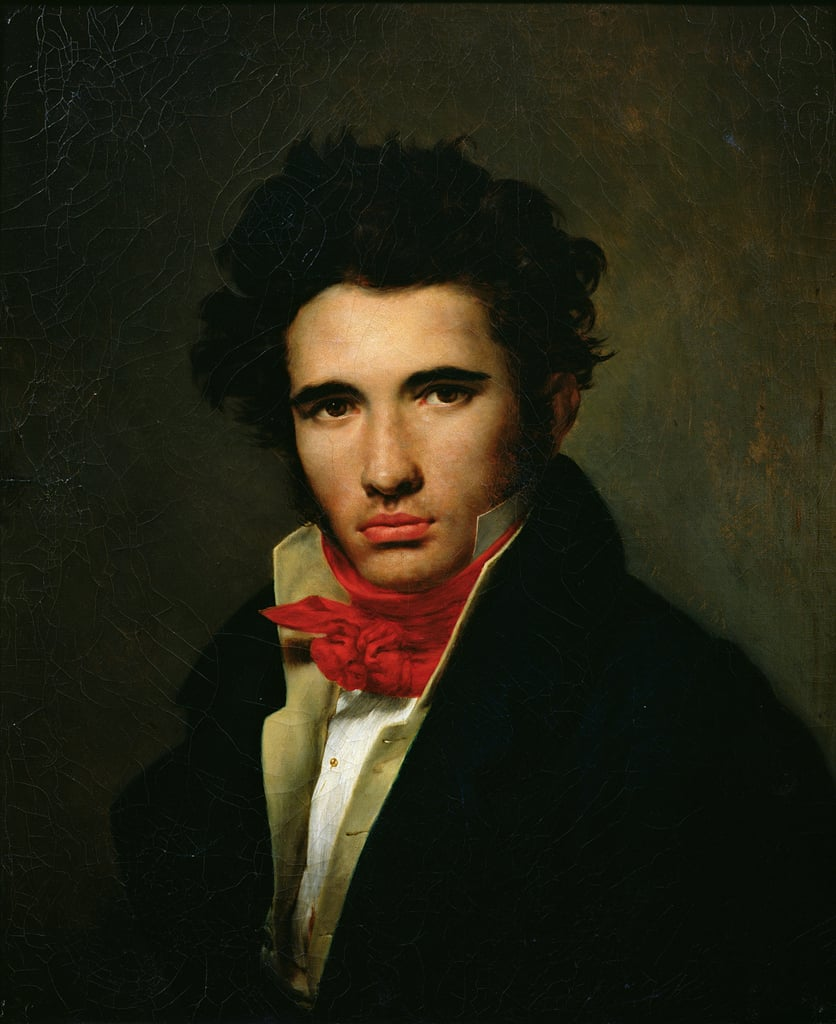
- Léon Cogniet. Self-portrait, c. 1818
- Born: Léon Cogniet; 29 August 1794; Paris, France
- Died: 20 November 1880 (aged 86); Paris, France
- Education: Pierre-Narcisse Guérin
- Known for: Painting
- Movement: Romanticism

Léon Cogniet (English: /kɒnˈjɛ/ kon-YEH, French: [leɔ̃ kɔɲɛ]; 29 August 1794 – 20 November 1880) was a French history and portrait painter. He is probably best remembered as a teacher, with more than one hundred students, some of them notable.

== Biography ==
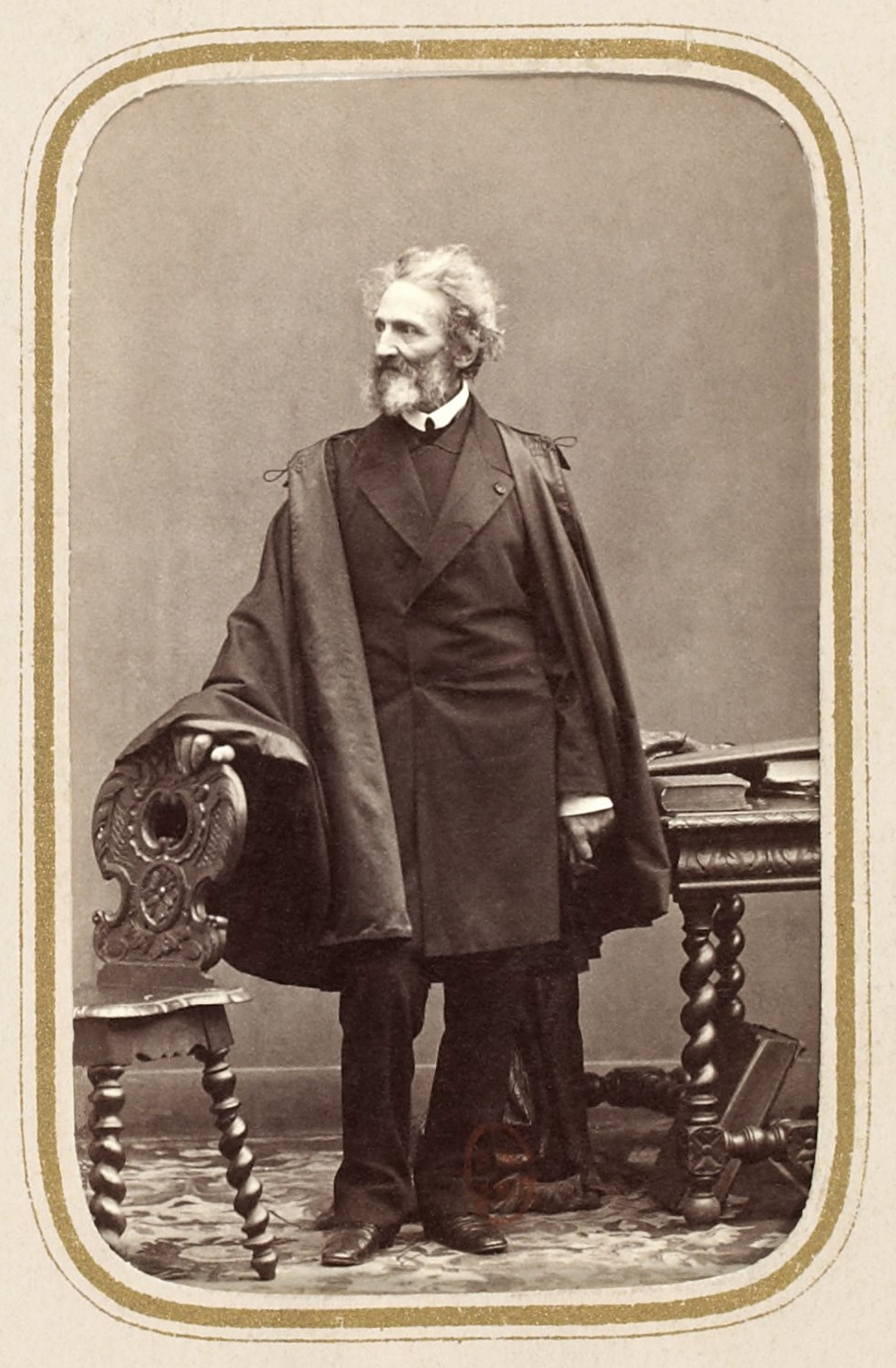
Cogniet in 1865

He was born in Paris. His father was a painter and wallpaper designer. In 1812, he enrolled at the École des Beaux-arts, where he studied with Pierre-Narcisse Guérin. He also worked in the studios of Jean-Victor Bertin. After failing an attempt to win the Prix de Rome in 1816, he won the following year with his depiction of Helen Rescued by Castor and Pollux and received a stipend to study at the French Academy in Rome until 1822. Before leaving, he had his first exhibition at the Salon.

In 1827, he created a series of murals on the life of Saint Stephen for the church of Saint-Nicholas-des-Champs. From 1833 to 1835, he painted a scene from Napoleon's expedition to Egypt on one of the ceilings at the Louvre. Between 1840 and 1860, he operated a popular painting workshop for women, directed by his sister Marie Amélie and one of his students, Catherine Caroline Thévenin (1813–1892), who later became his wife. After 1843, he concentrated almost entirely on teaching, with an occasional portrait. After 1855, he essentially gave up painting.

After 1831, he taught design at the Lycée Louis-le-Grand. He also taught at the École polytechnique from 1847 to 1861. In 1851, he was appointed a Professor at the École des Beaux-arts, a position he held until 1863, when he retired, slowly giving up his private students and becoming more reclusive.

He died forgotten in the 10th arrondissement of Paris in 1880 and is interred at Père-Lachaise.

His sister was the painter Marie Amélie Cogniet.

== Selected works ==
History paintings:

- La Garde nationale de Paris part pour l’armée, Septembre 1792 (The Paris National Guard on its way to the Army, September 1792)
- Tintoretto painting his dead daughter (1843; Musée des Beaux-Arts de Bordeaux)
- Scenes of July 1830 (1830). The day after the "Three Glorious Days" of the 1830 Revolution, the painter depicts the white flag of the restoration of the monarchy (on the left), torn and revealing the blue sky (in the middle). The red fold then spreads like a bloodstain (on the right). thus recreating the Republic's tricolor flag.

Portraits:

- Maréchal Maison
- Louis Philippe
- M. de Crillon
- Jean-François Champollion

== Gallery ==
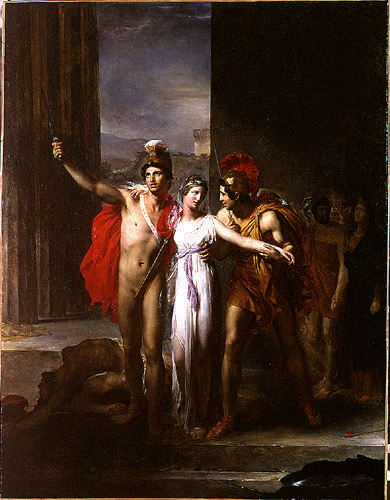
Helen Rescued by Castor and Pollux, 1817

The Artist in His Room at the Villa Medici, Rome, 1817

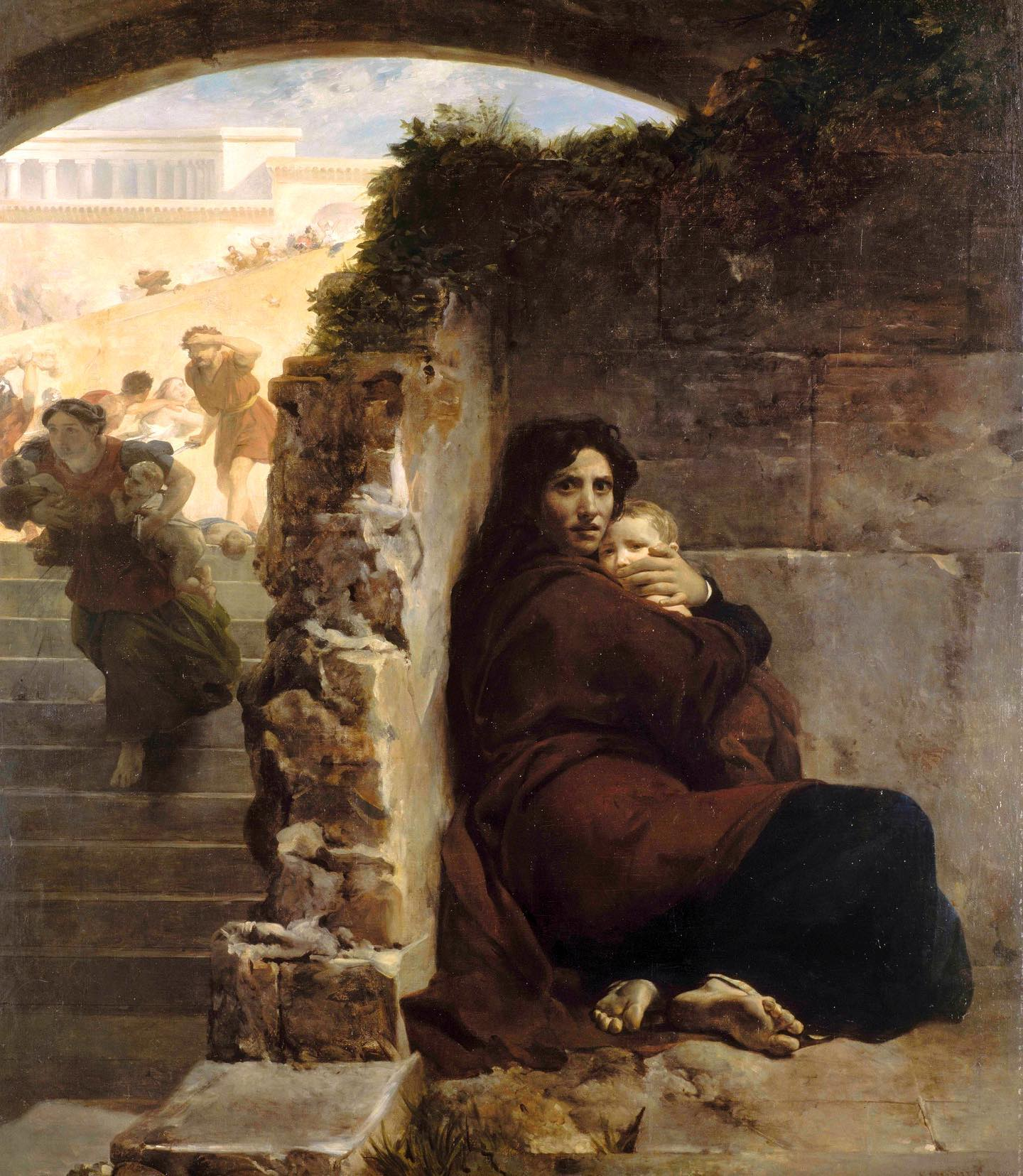
Massacre of the Innocents, 1824

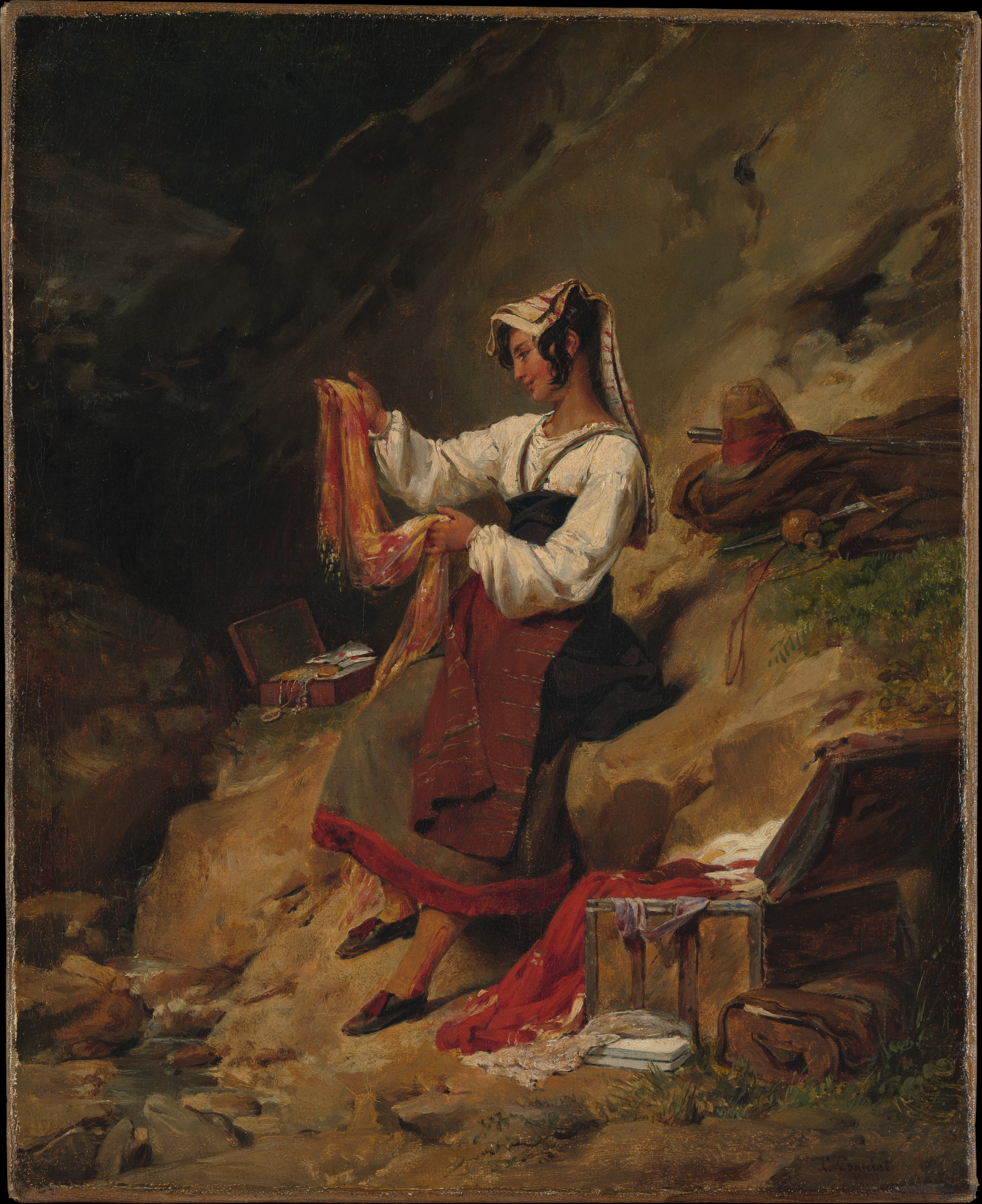
The Italian Brigand's Wife, 1826

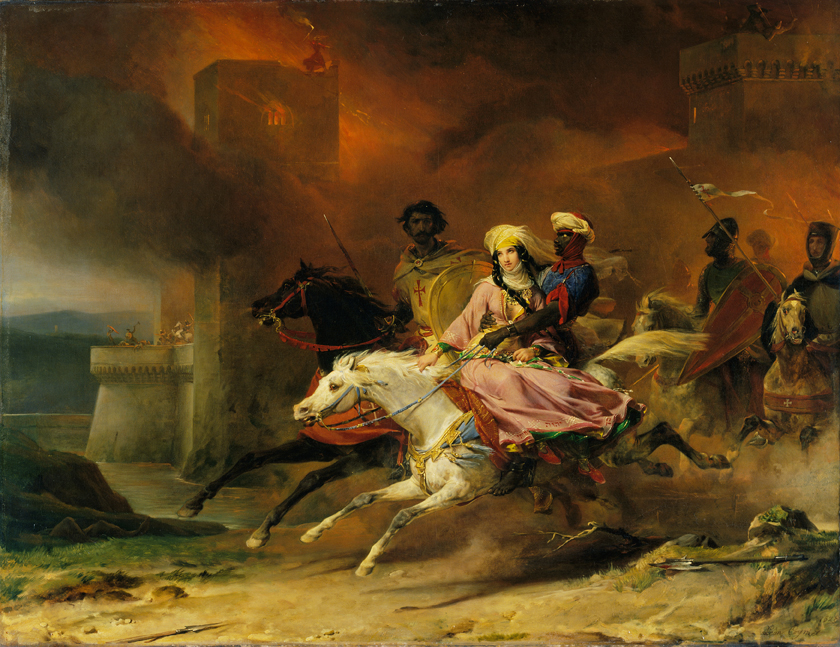
Rebecca and Brian de Bois-Guilbert, 1828

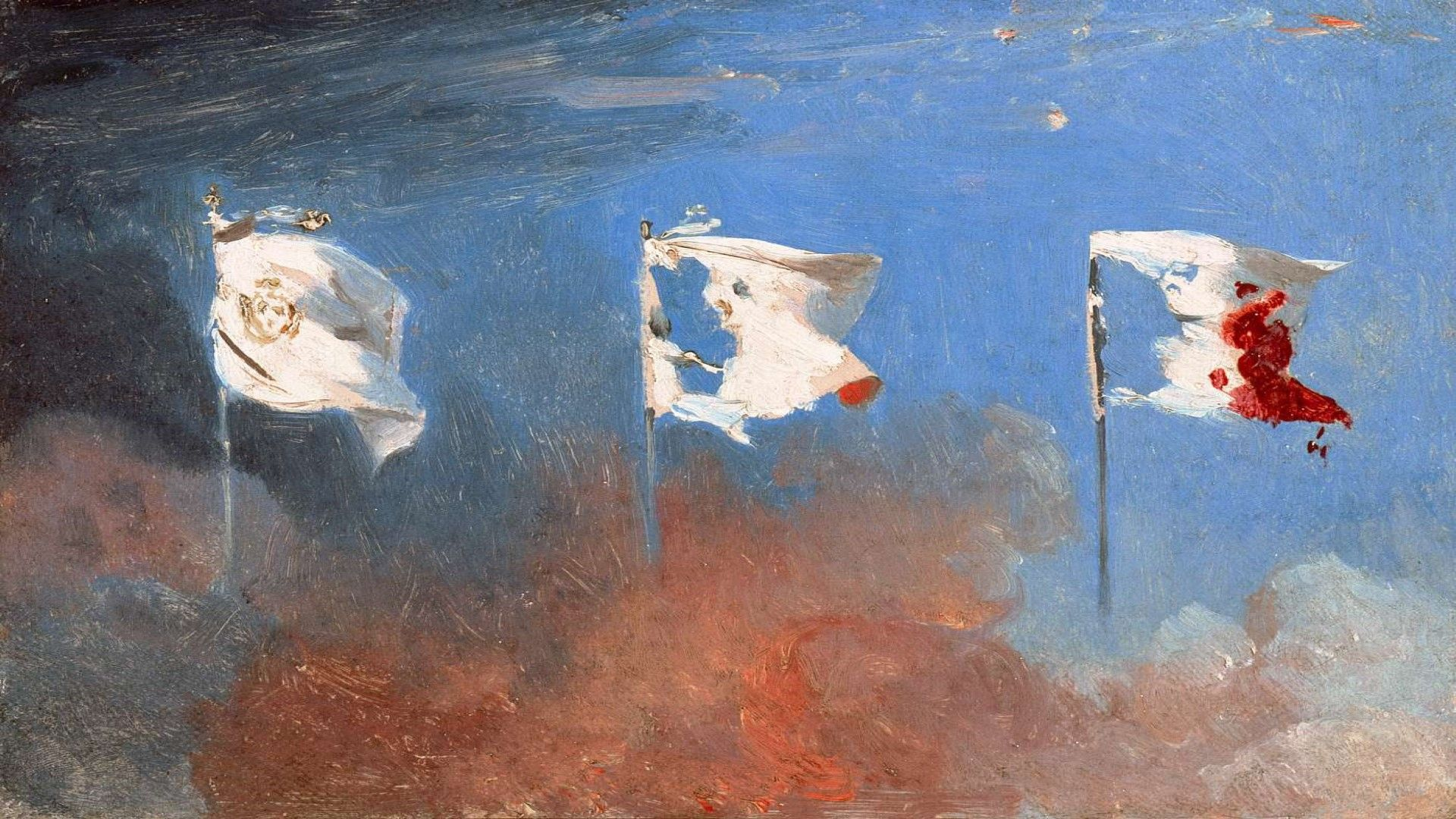
Scenes of July 1830, 1830

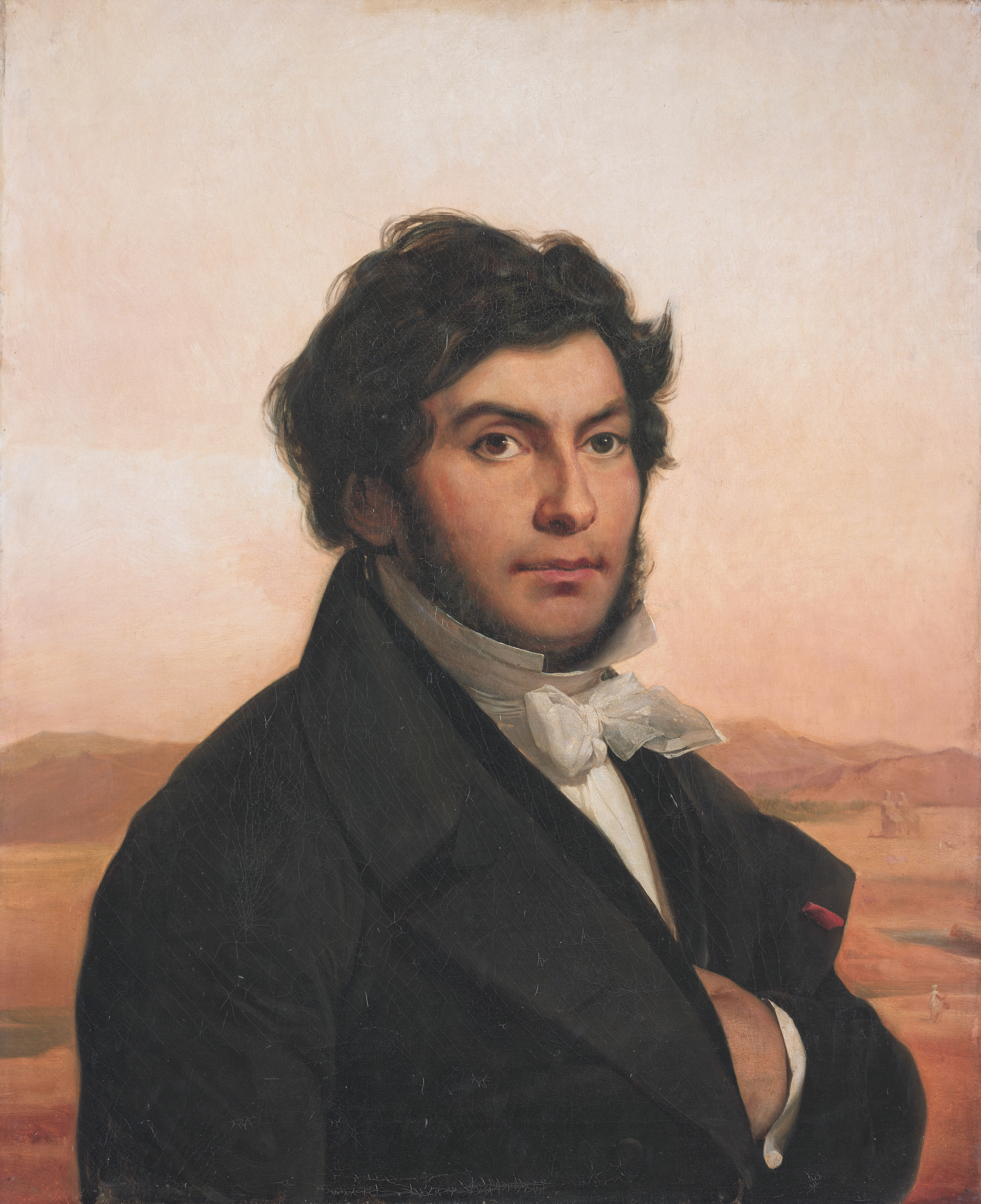
Jean-François Champollion, 1831

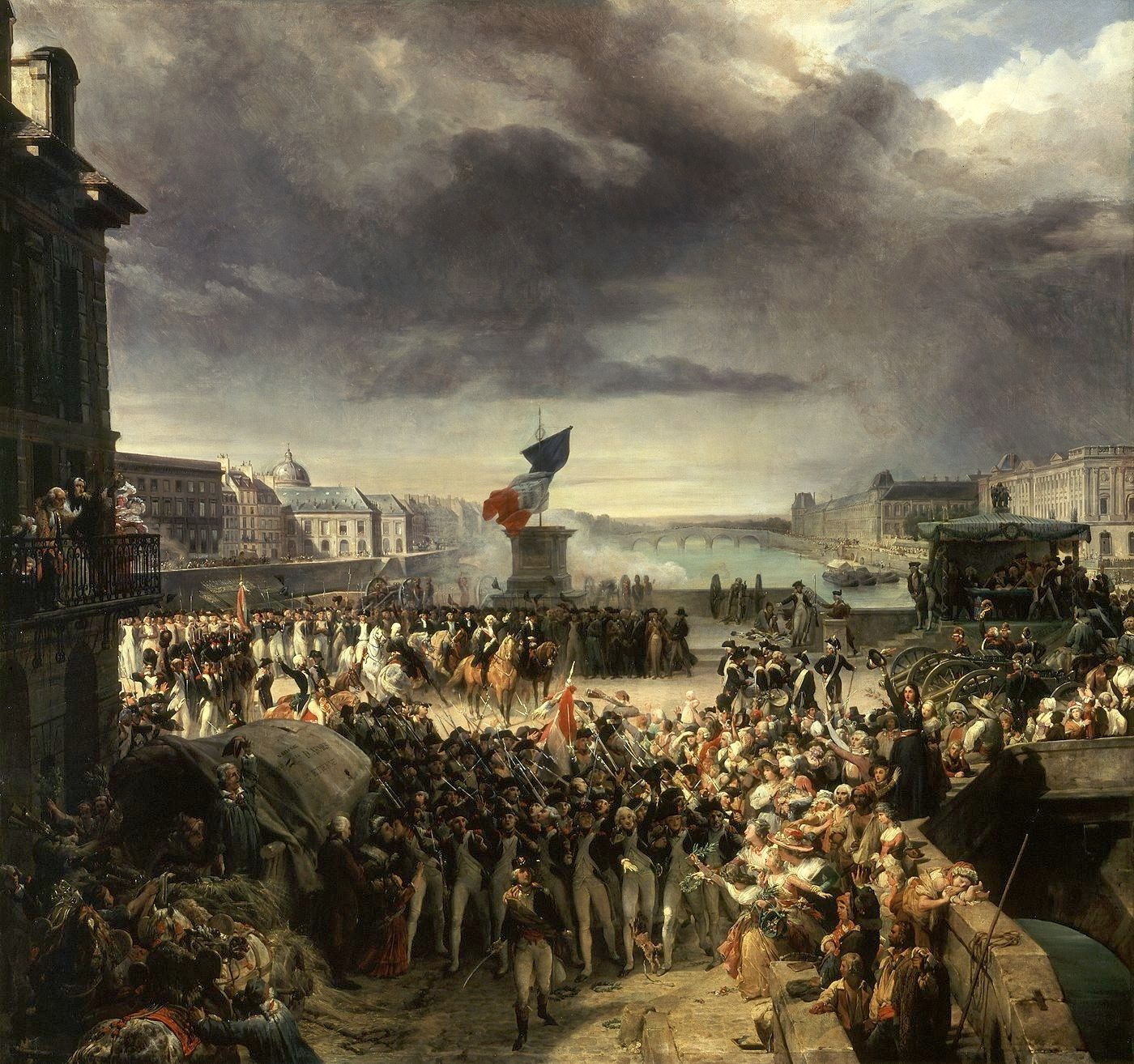
The National Guard of Paris Departs for the Army, 1834

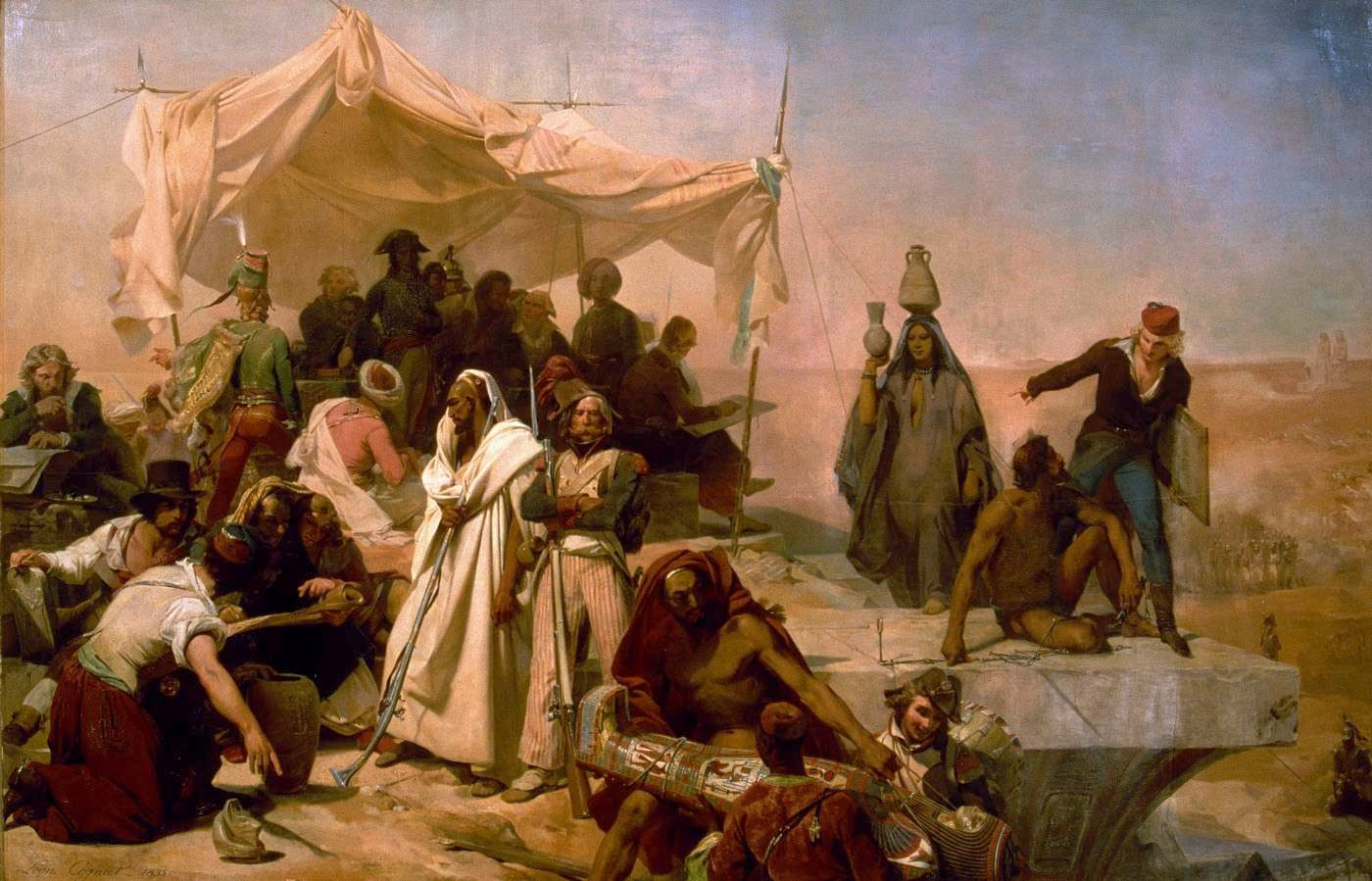
The Egyptian Expedition Under the Command of Bonaparte, ceiling at the Louvre, 1835

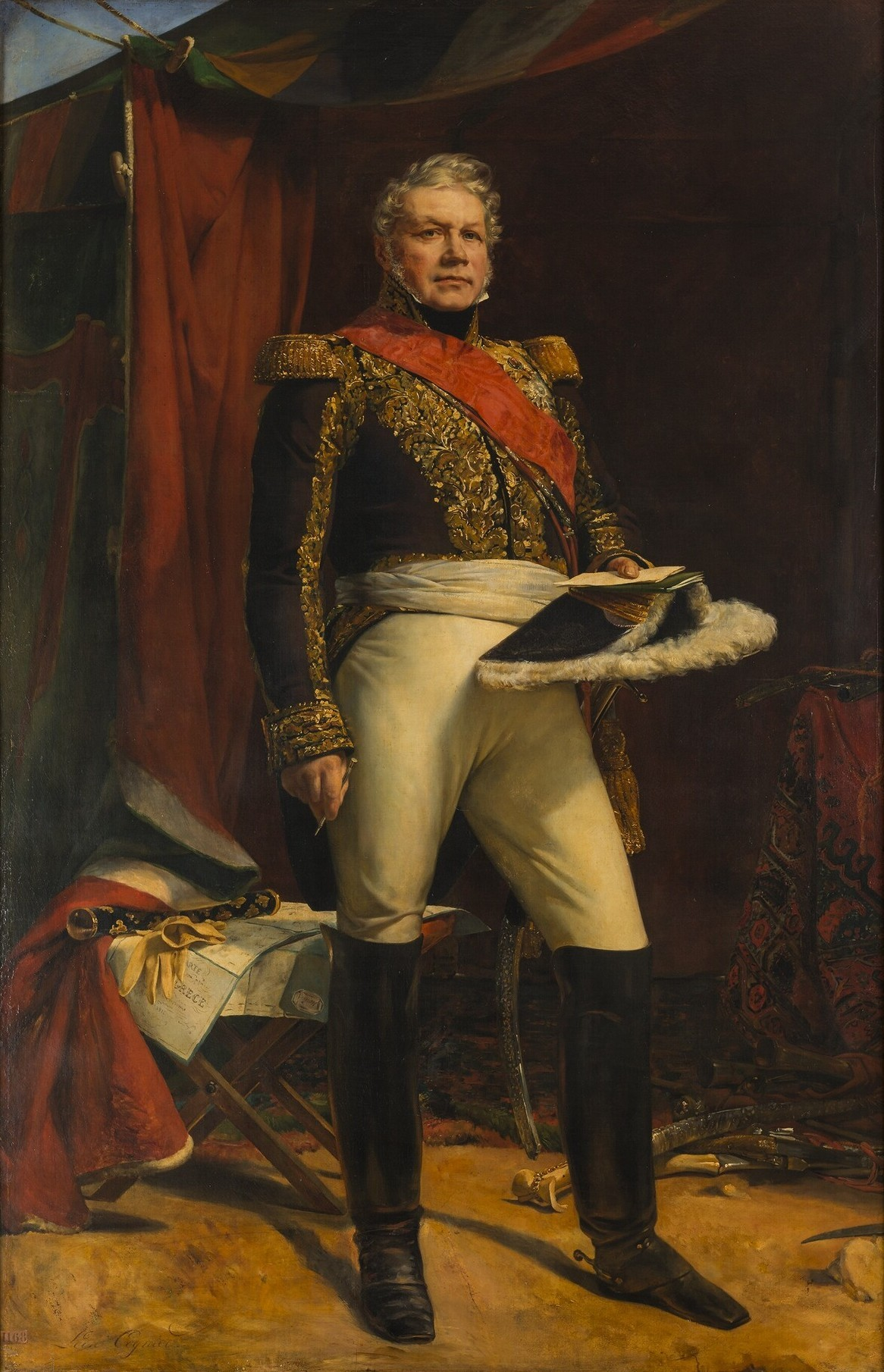
Portrait of Nicolas Joseph Maison, 1835

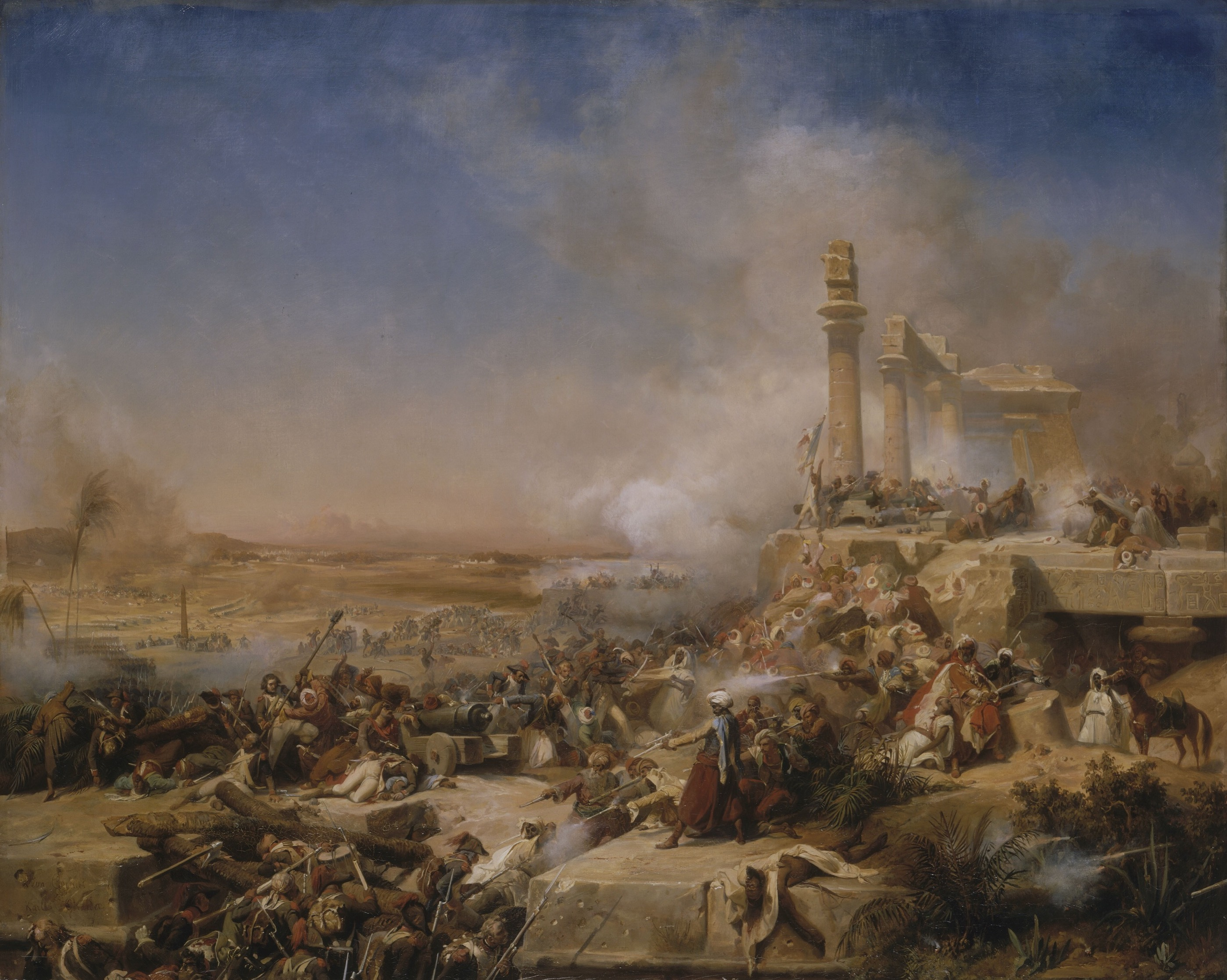
The Battle of Heliopolis, 1837

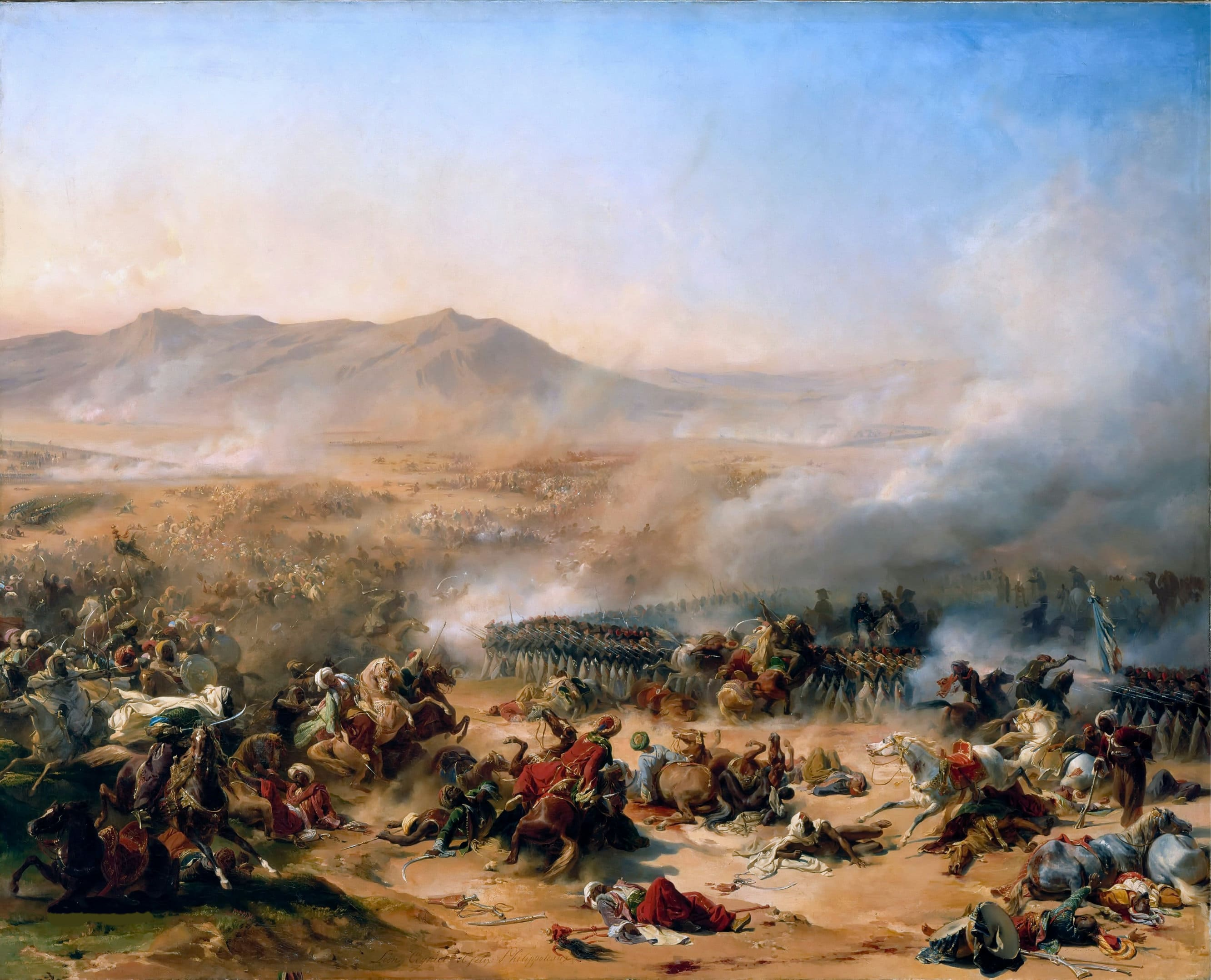
The Battle of Mount Tabor, 1838

== Pupils ==
Among his numerous students were:

- Pedro Américo
- Félix-Joseph Barrias
- Louis-Ernest Barrias
- Émile Bayard
- François-Léon Benouville
- Émile Bin
- Nils Blommér
- Rosa Bonheur
- Léon Bonnat
- Alfred Boucher
- Marie-Abraham Rosalbin de Buncey
- Adolphe-Félix Cals
- Henriette Cappelaere
- Henri Chapu
- François Chifflart
- Pierre Auguste Cot
- Alfred Darjou
- Alfred de Dreux
- Alfred Dehodencq
- Godefroy Durand
- Louis Duveau
- Augustin Feyen-Perrin
- Claude Ferdinand Gaillard
- Wojciech Gerson
- Karl Girardet
- Eugène Ernest Hillemacher
- Jean-Paul Laurens
- Jules Lefebvre
- Diogène Maillart
- Francisco Masias Rodriguez
- Oscar-Pierre Mathieu
- Constant Mayer
- Jean-Louis-Ernest Meissonier
- Hugues Merle
- Charles Louis Müller
- Ion Negulici
- Victor Nehlig
- Dominique Papety
- Henri Félix Emmanuel Philippoteaux
- Paul Philippoteaux
- Adolphe Piot
- Gustav Richter
- Tony Robert-Fleury
- Henryk Rodakowski
- Louis Rubio
- Eugénie Salanson
- August Friedrich Schenck
- Hippolyte Sebron
- Alexandre Ségé
- Charles Sellier
