= The National Guard of Paris Departs for the Army =

Painting by Léon Cogniet

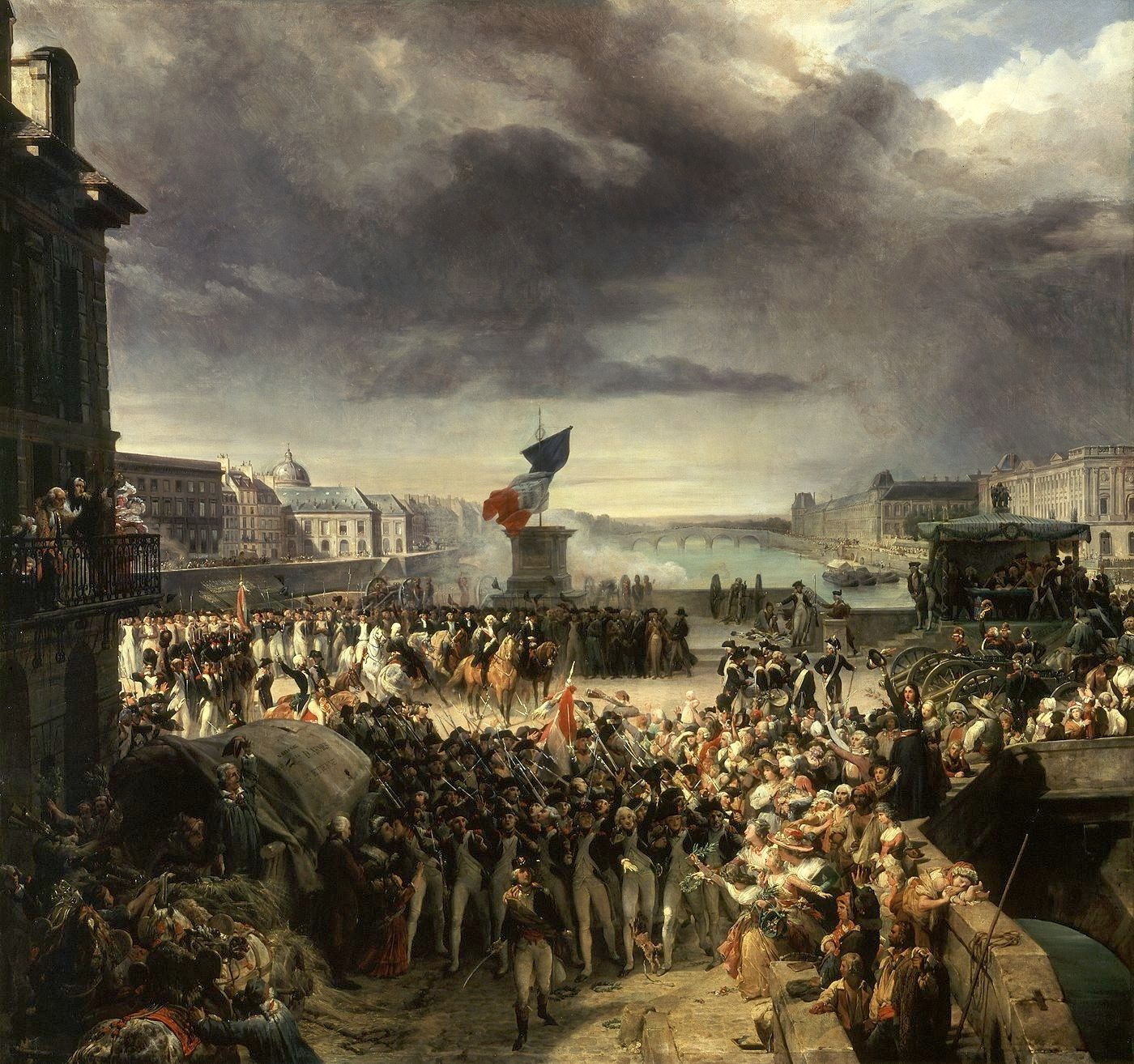
- Artist: Léon Cogniet
- Year: 1834
- Type: Oil on canvas, history painting
- Dimensions: 78 cm × 189 cm (31 in × 74 in)
- Location: Palace of Versailles; Versailles

The National Guard of Paris Departs for the Army (French: La Garde nationale de Paris part pour l'armée is an oil on canvas history painting by the French artist Léon Cogniet, from 1834.

== History and description ==
The work was commissioned by Louis Philippe I who had come to power in the July Revolution of 1830. It was exhibited at the Salon of 1836 at the Louvre. Today it is in the collection of the Palace of Versailles.

It depicts a scene from September 1792 during the French Revolution. With a coalition of enemy forces marching on Paris, the city's National Guard departed the city to join up with the French Revolutionary Army. (See also fr:Garde nationale de Paris.) The French victory at the Battle of Valmy later that month was a turning point in the conflict.

The scene shows the western end of the fr:Quai de l'Horloge where it meets the Pont Neuf as it crosses the Île de la Cité. The building on the extreme left is No. 41, Quai de l'Horloge, which still exists as of 2026.

The painting uses the tricolour as the central focus in celebration of patriotic devotion. The plinth to which the flag is attached used to support the equestrian statue of Henry IV, which was torn down the previous month during the Insurrection of 10 August 1792, leading to the downfall of the monarchy; the statue was restored by 1818.

The following people are represented in the painting:

- Jérôme Pétion de Villeneuve, lawyer, first President of the National Convention and second Mayor of Paris
- Nicolas Joseph Maison, later marquis, Peer and Marshal of France
- Paul Thiébault, later Divisional general and writer
- Jean-Baptiste-Claude Odiot, soldier and gold/silversmith
- Theroigne de Mericourt, political activist and heroine of the French Revolution

Visible in the background are (l. to r.): the Monnaie de Paris; the dome of the Collège des Quatre-Nations; the Pont Royal (the Pont des Arts (1804) and Pont du Carrousel (1834) didn't exist in 1792); the Tuileries; and the Palais du Louvre.

The general view, particularly of the buildings along the River Seine, the cannon firing behind the plinth, and the recruiting tent on the centre right, echoes an earlier engraving from 1802 by Louis-Martin Berthault after a painting, Proclamation de la Patrie en danger (22 juillet 1792) by Jean-Louis Prieur. This depicts a similar scene which took place in the same place a year earlier, after the publication of 'La patrie en danger' by the French Legislative Assembly.

== Bibliography ==
- Boime, Albert. Art in an Age of Civil Struggle, 1848-1871. University of Chicago Press, 2008.
- Hargrove, June Ellen. The Statues of Paris: An Open-air Pantheon. Mercatorfonds, 1989.
- Plazy, Gilles. Paris: History, Architecture, Art, Lifestyle, in Detail. Flammarion, 2003.
