= Gustav Richter (artist) =

German artist

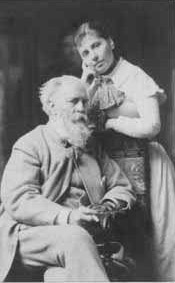
Gustav Richter and his wife Cornelie

Gustav Carl Ludwig Richter (3 August 1823, Berlin – 3 April 1884, Berlin) was a German figure and portrait painter.

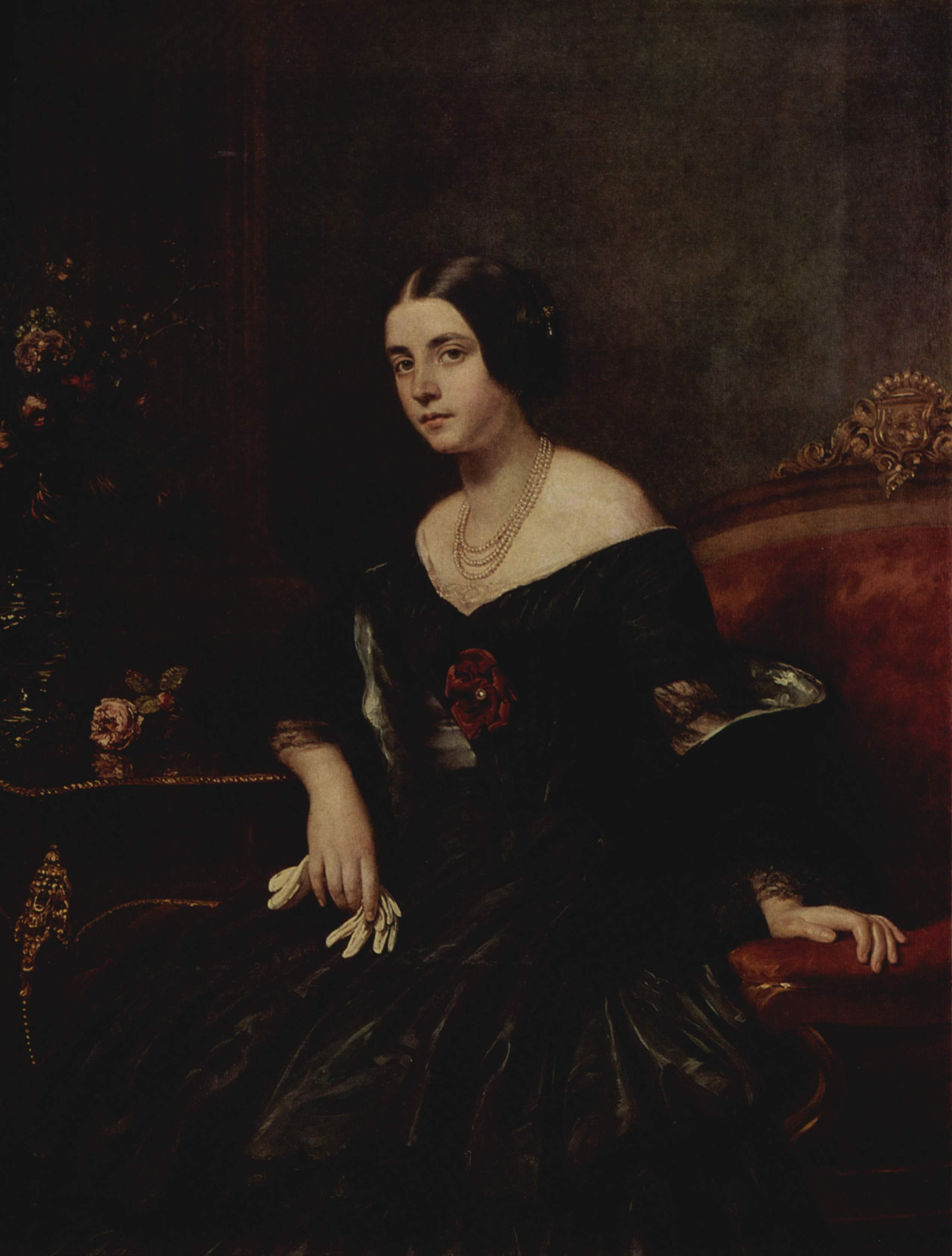
Gustav Richter: Portrait of a lady in a black dress, ca. 1850

== Biography ==
Born in Berlin, Richter began his studies at the academy there under Eduard Holbein, then was a pupil of Cogniet in Paris, and studied in Rome until 1849. From 1850 to 1852, accompanied by Gustav Heidenreich and Robert Müller, he painted decorative frescos depicting Norse gods above doorways in the Vaterländischen Saal of the Neues Museum in Berlin. The technical qualities of his "Raising of Jairus's Daughter" (1856, National Gallery, Berlin), painted for King Frederick William IV, aroused great enthusiasm on its exhibition, but both this and a large oil painting "Building of the Pyramids" (1859–72), Maximilianeum, Munich), ordered by the King of Bavaria, suffer from theatrical pathos.

Recognizing the limitations of his talent, Richter confined himself thereafter to single figures and portraiture, in which he was more successful. The first of a series of aristocratic beauties was that of Princess Carolath (1872). Of several family groups, reflecting the artist's own domestic happiness, two called "Evviva!", the painter with his first-born, and "Maternal Happiness," the painter's wife (youngest daughter of Meyerbeer) with their second son, were among the gems of the exhibition in 1874.

His maturest works combine thorough characterization with real pictorial qualities. Fine examples are: "Banker's Wife" (1876), "Countess Karolyi" (1878), and, best of all, the well-known ideal portrait of Queen Louise (1879, Cologne Museum). Mention should be made also of the portraits of Emperor William I (1876, 1877), Empress Augusta (1878), and General Count von Blumenthal (1883, unfinished, National Gallery, Berlin) and the wildly popular "Neapolitan Fisher Boy" (c. 1873).
