= Louis Duveau =

French painter

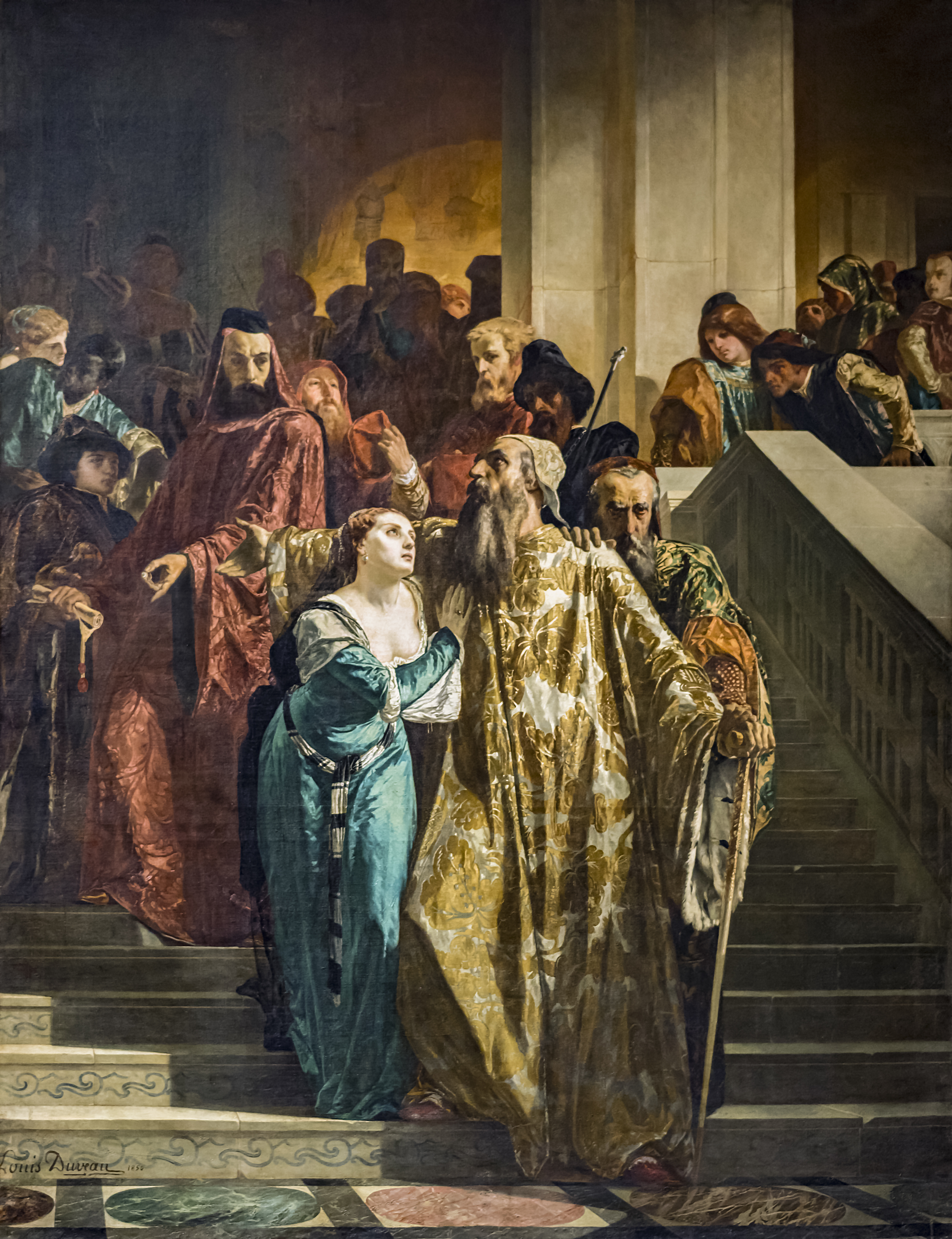
The Abdication of Doge Foscari, 1850, Musée des Augustins Toulouse

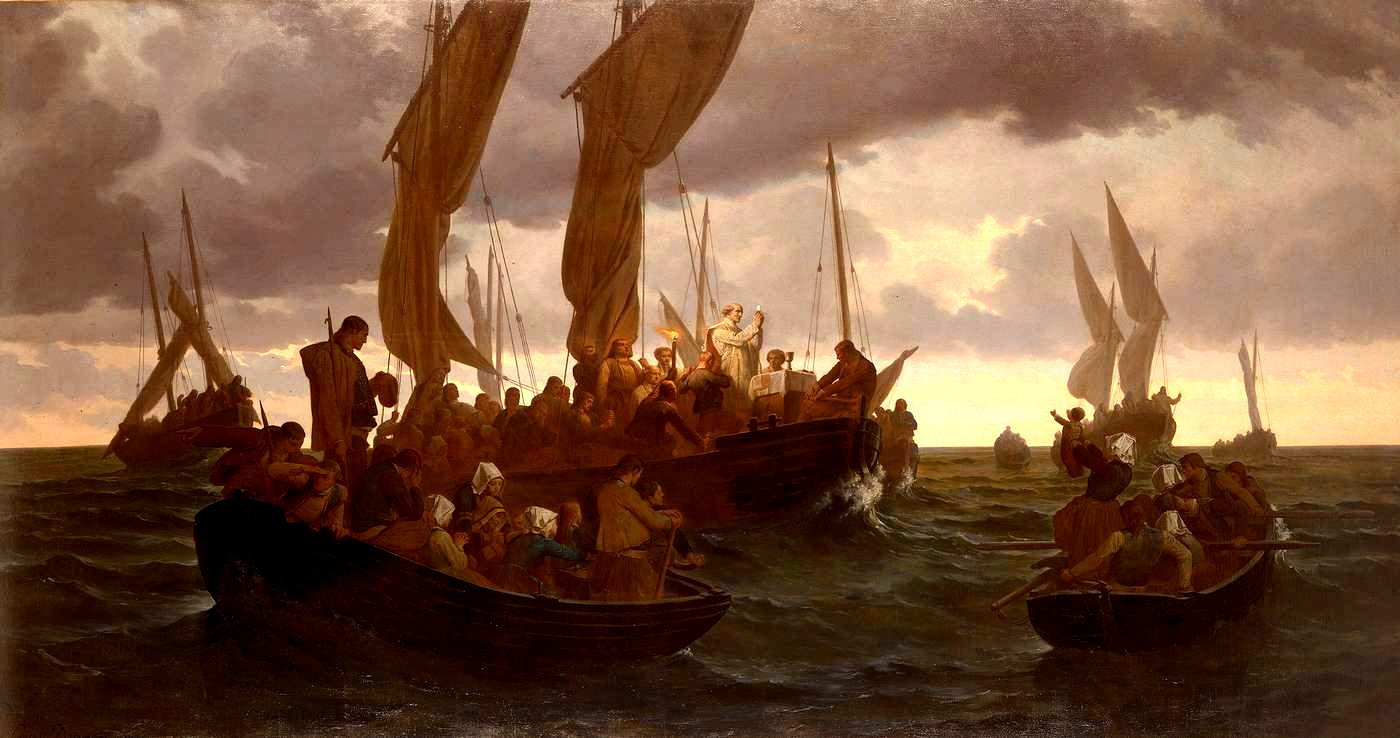
Mass at sea, 1864, now at the Museum of Fine Arts of Rennes

Louis-Jean-Noël Duveau, a French painter, who was born at St. Malo in 1818, studied history and genre painting under Léon Cogniet in Paris, and afterwards visited Italy. He was successful in representing scenes of fisher-life in his native country. He died in Paris in 1867. In the Lille Museum is his Perseus and Andromeda, painted in 1865.
