= James Hopwood the Younger =

British engraver and printmaker

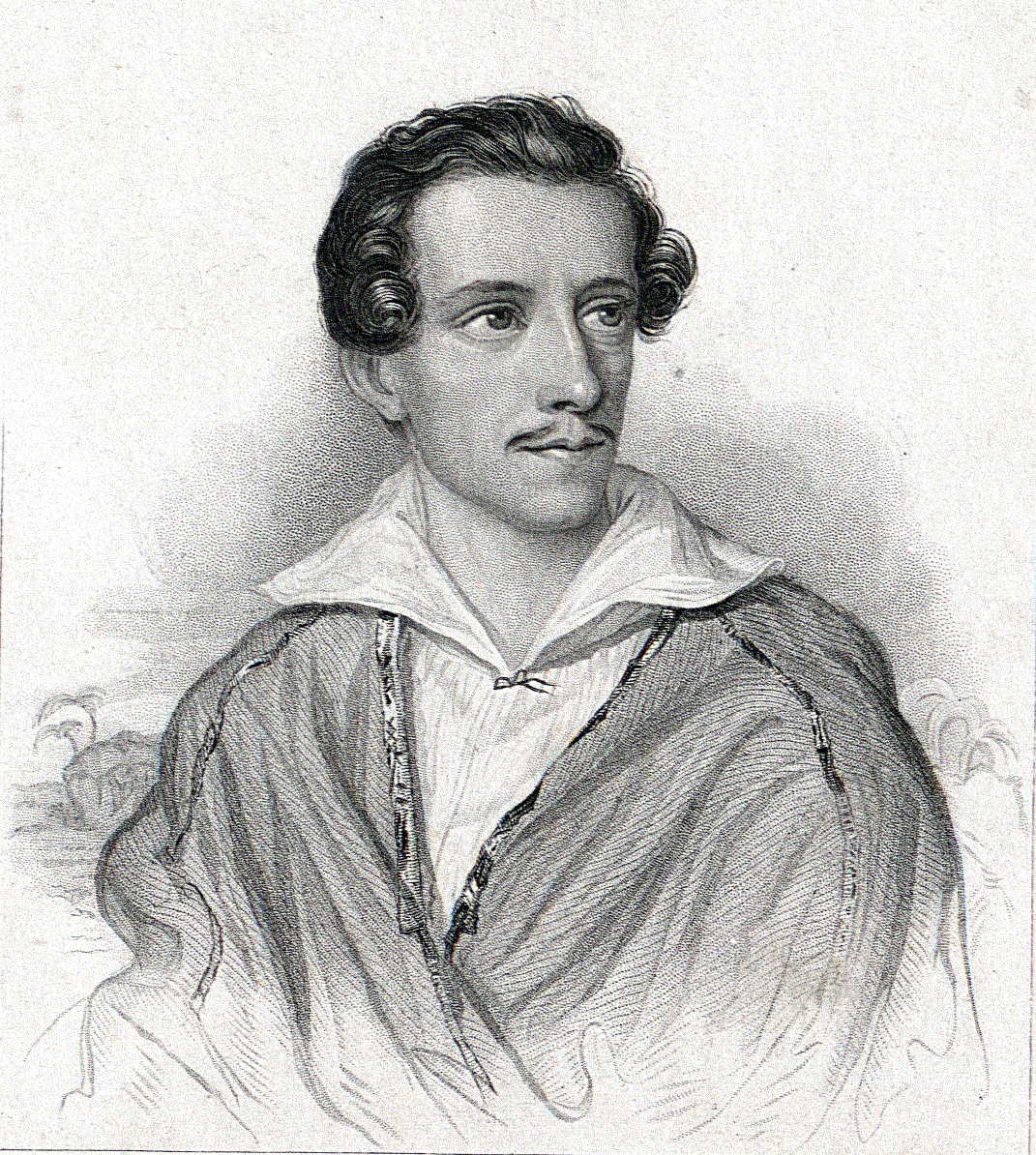
Juliusz Słowacki by James Hopwood

James Hopwood, referred to as James Hopwood the Younger or James Hopwood the Second (James Hopwood II) (c. 1800–1850; vital dates also given as 1795–1855), engraver, son of James Hopwood the elder, followed his father's profession, and engraved in the stipple manner. He designed and engraved illustrations for books, and was employed in engraving for Finden's ‘Byron’ and some of the annuals. Subsequently, he went to Paris, where he was very extensively employed in engraving portraits on a small scale for the numerous collections of portraits published at that time. Some of these have merit, but his style did not command much attention, being almost the last survival of the school of stipple-engraving. Claude Ferdinand Gaillard, the well-known French engraver, received his first lessons in his art from Hopwood.
