= James Hopwood the Elder =

British engraver and printmaker

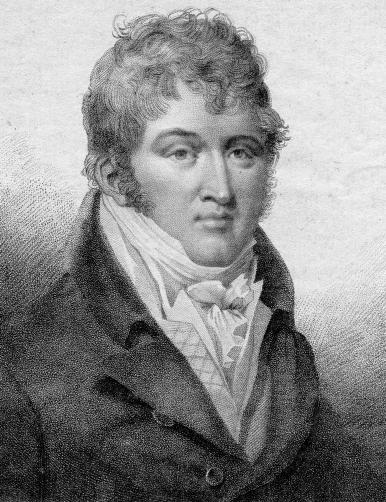
Richard Chenevix by James Hopwood

James Hopwood, referred to as James Hopwood the Elder or James Hopwood Senior (c. 1740/50s–1819) was a British engraver and printmaker.

== Life ==
He was born at Beverley in Yorkshire. Sources give different years of birth (1745, 1752, 1754). He took to engraving at the age of forty-five, as a means of supporting a family of six children. By industry he succeeded in engraving and publishing two plates, on the strength of which he came to London, where James Heath permitted him to work at his profession in his house. By assiduous work he gained some experience and employment in his profession, though he never attained any great reputation. Hopwood was elected in 1813 secretary to the Artists' Benevolent Fund, and held the post till 1818, when he resigned through illness. He published, in 1812, a pamphlet in defence of that society. He died 29 September 1819. A portrait of Hopwood, from a drawing by A. Cooper, R.A., will be found in Pye's ‘Patronage of British Art’ (p. 335).

He was the father of James Hopwood the Younger.
