= Eugène Fichel =

French painter

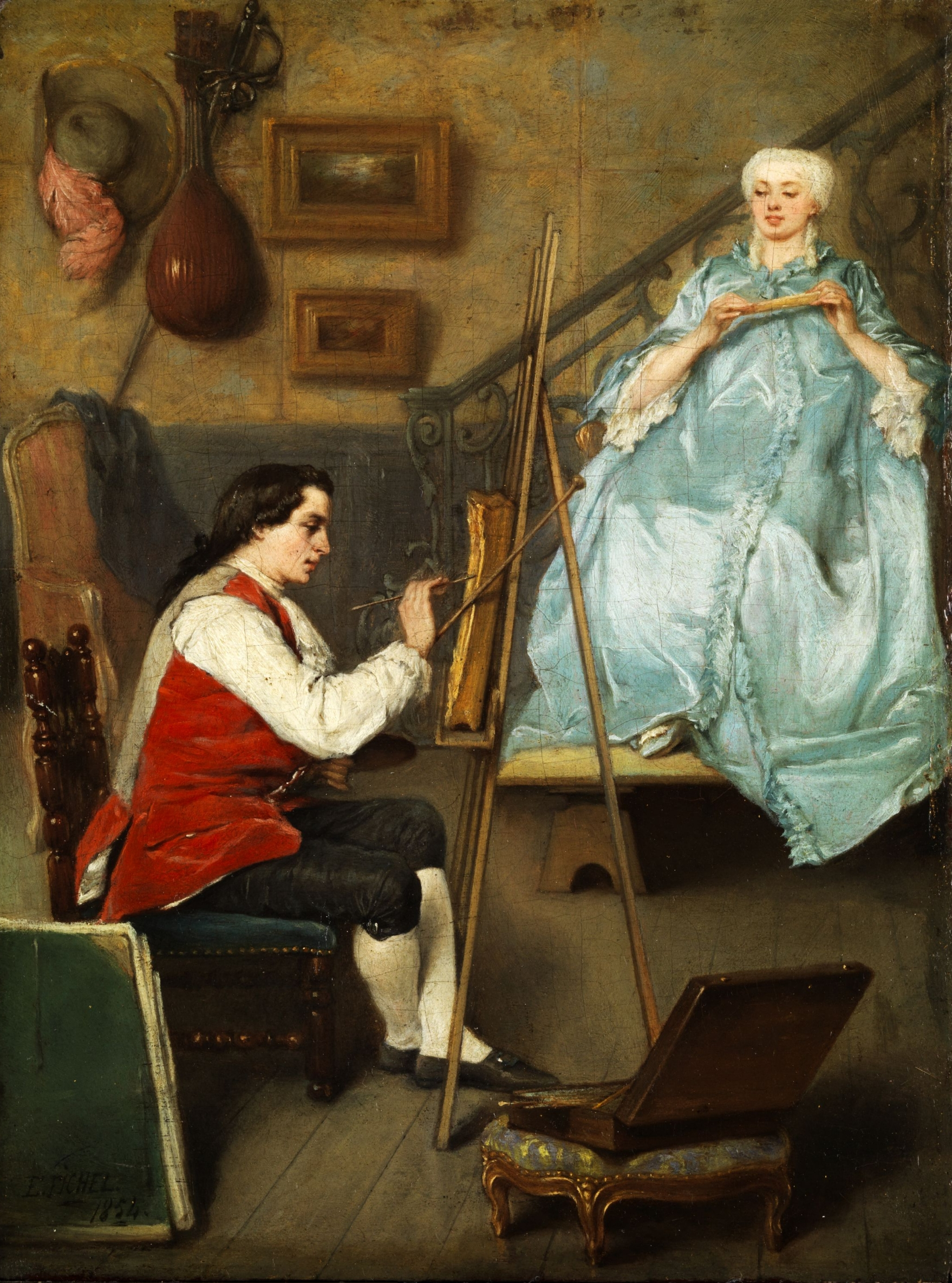
Eugène Fichel, "Painter doing a portrait of a young woman," Oil on wood, 1854

Benjamin Eugène Fichel (30 August 1826, Paris – 2 February 1895, Paris) son of Moise Mayer Fichel and Lili Abigail Sasias, was a French painter.

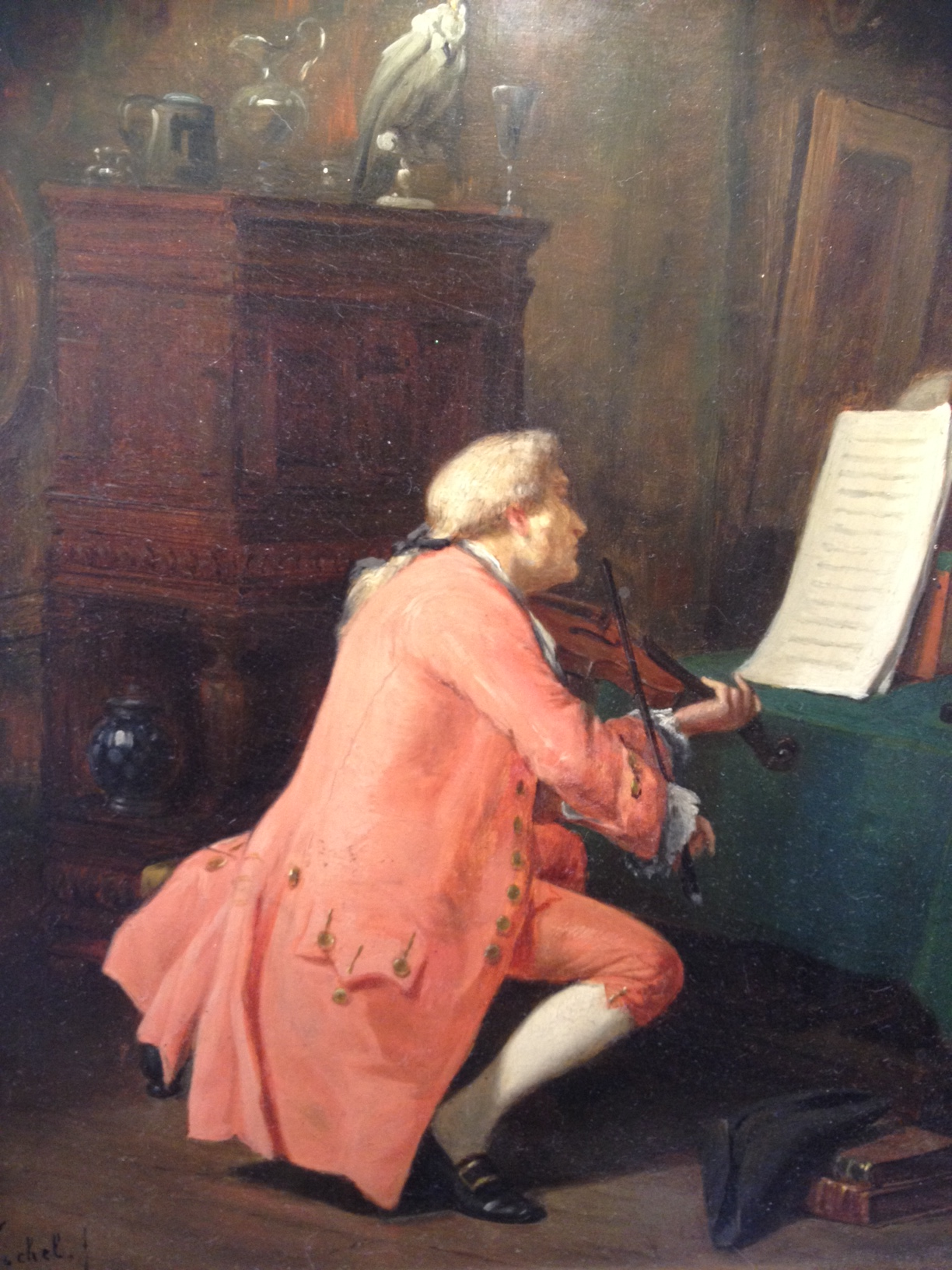
The violinist

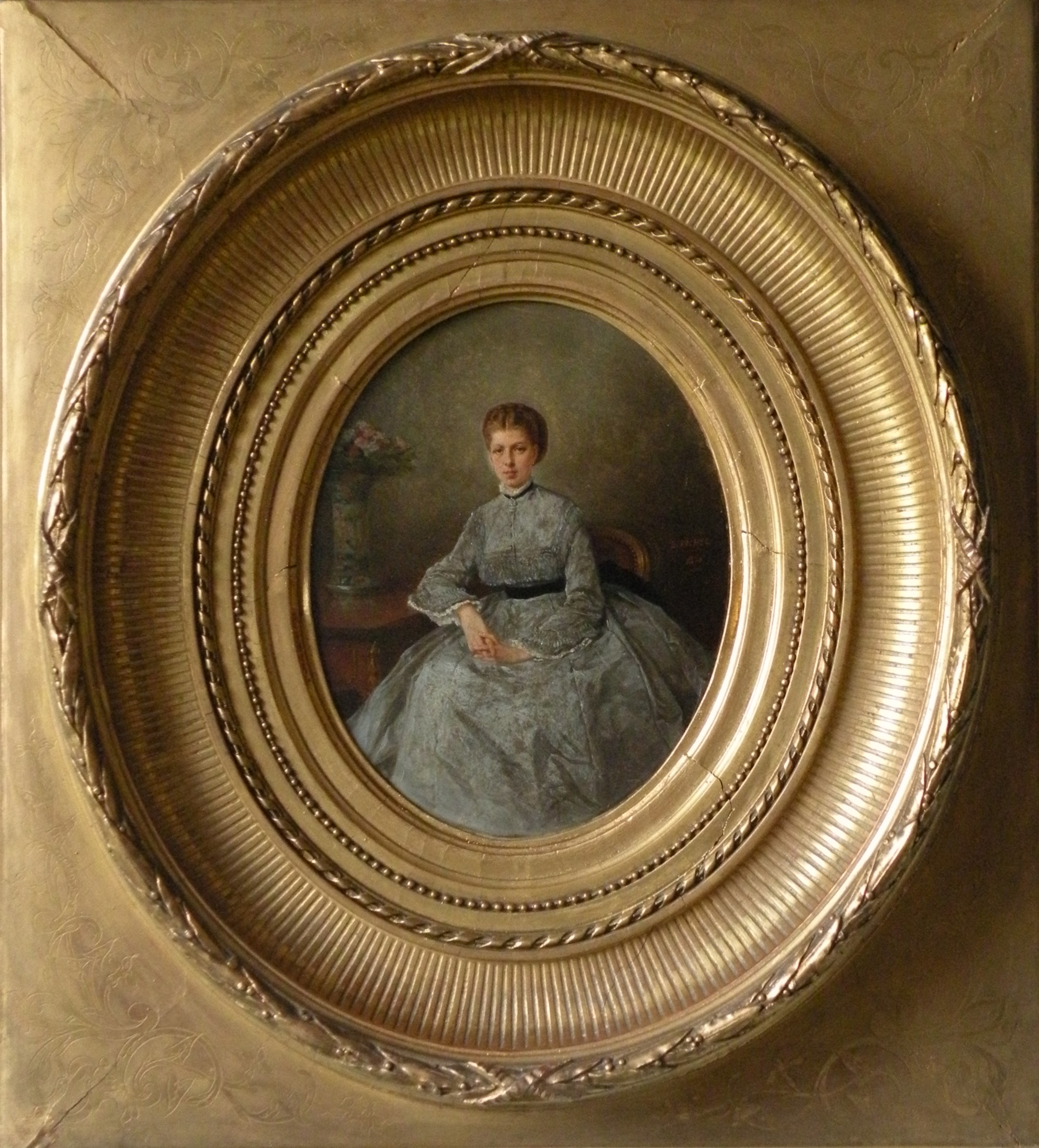
Eugène Fichel (1826-1895). Portrait de Mme. Palmyre Bordier, 1870

== Biography ==
Eugène Fichel entered the École des Beaux-Arts in 1844 and became a pupil of Hippolyte Delaroche and Michel Martin Drolling, but painted very much more under the inspiration of Jean-Louis-Ernest Meissonier, whose exquisite handling is suggested in numerous small canvases of his which by their refined technique and vivid action recall the characteristic intensity and directness of composition which belong to the painter of "Friedland." His students included Jeanne Samson, who first exhibited at the Salon in 1869, and whom he later married.

Along with great care in finish, Fichel's canvases also exhibit an archæological exactness, and a kind of delicate humor. His first work of importance was exhibited in 1849 and in 1850 he participated with "Harvey Demonstrating the Circulation of the Blood to Charles I". In 1857 he received a medal for his painting in the Paris Salon of that year and received a second medal in 1869. He exhibited a canvas every year at the Salon until 1895. He became Chevalier of the Legion of Honor in 1870.

== Works ==
The principal works of Fichel are genre paintings. These include "The End of Dinner", "A Festival in the Year 1776", "The Capture of a Spy", "The Wandering Singers", "A Morning Call", "The Arrival at the Inn", "The Council of War", "Tavern scene" and others. He also did history paintings which have the freedom and imagination of pure genre: "The Night of August 24, 1572" and "Founding of the French Academy." Society portraits include that of Mrs. Laure Caillot (1832-1918) painted in 1854, spouse of Jacques Caillot (1823-1905) who designed Art Nouveau jewellery and hair combs and of Mrs. "Palmyre Bordier" painted in 1870, spouse of painter and inspector general of fine arts Alfred Arago, son of François Arago. Many of Fichel's paintings are in galleries and private collections. "At the Tailor (1881)" is located in San Francisco. Two of his paintings, "A Violin Player," executed in 1871, and "Awaiting an Audience," painted in 1881, are in the New York Metropolitan Museum of Art.

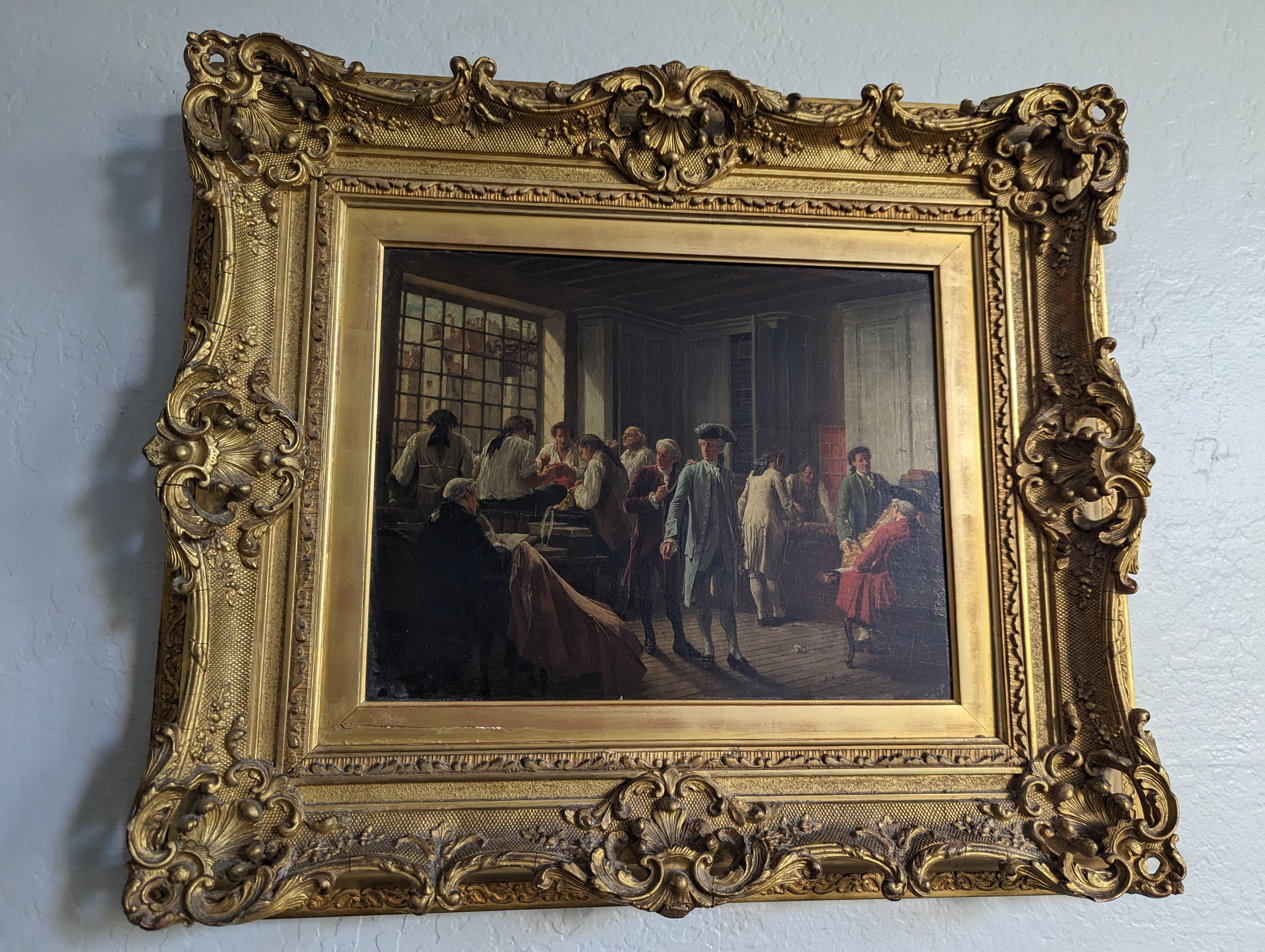
At the Tailor, (1881), Eugène Fichel, oil on wood, San Francisco, Private Collection

Works of Benjamin Eugène Fichel

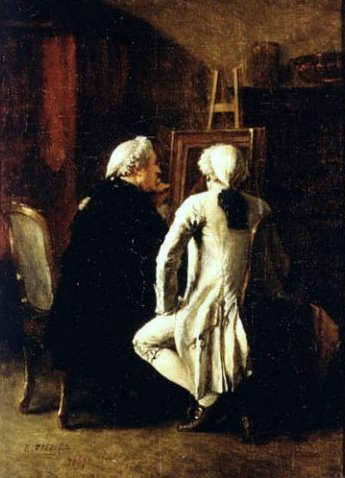
In the atelier (1857), São Paulo, Ema Gordon Klabin Cultural Foundation.

Madame P. (1857), Williamstown, Clark Art Institute.

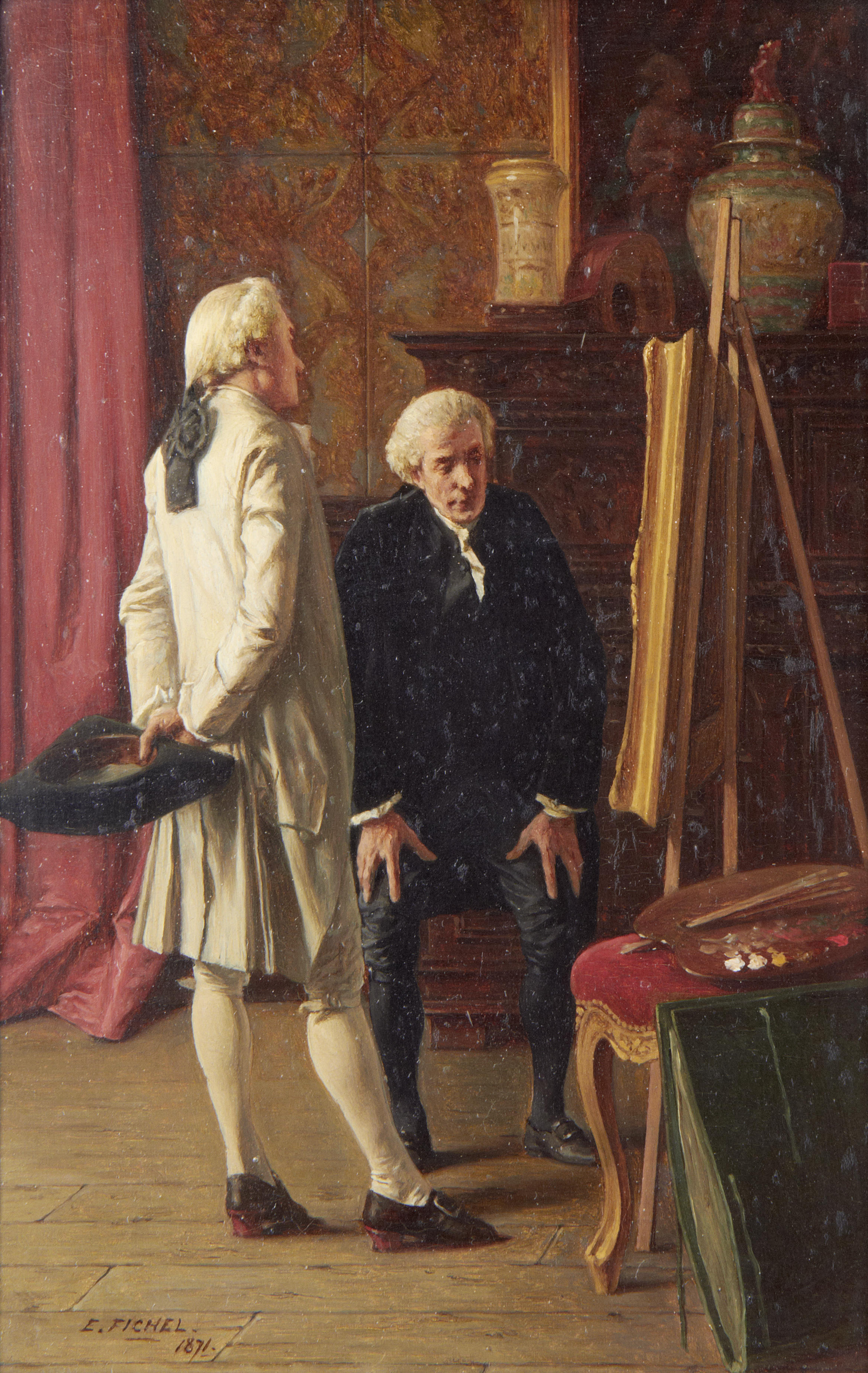
The connoisseurs (1871), Location unknown.

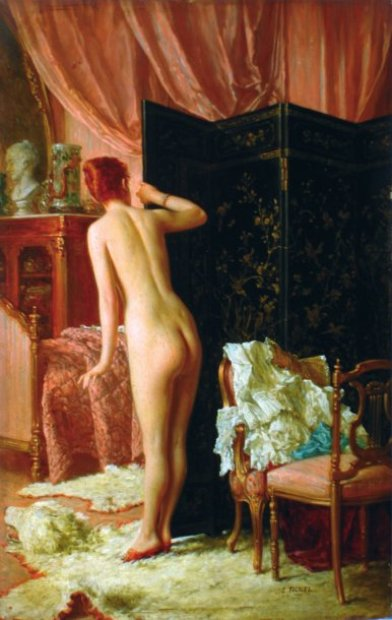
Nude behind folding screen, location unknown.
