= Jeanne Fichel =

French painter

- Born: 1849; Lyon
- Died: 1906 (aged 56–57)

Jeanne Fichel, née Samson (1849–1906) was a French genre painter.

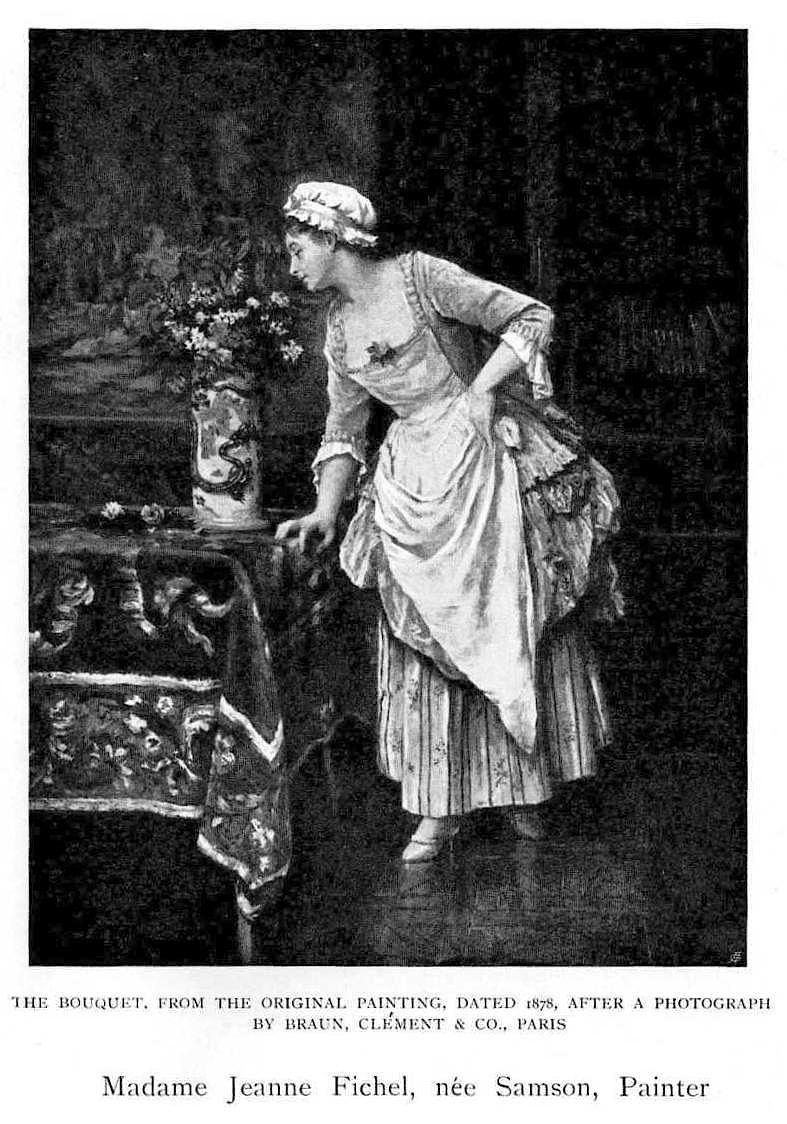
The Bouquet

Jeanne Fichel was born in Lyon and became a pupil of Eugène Fichel, whom she later married. She showed works at the Paris Salon from 1869 onwards. Her 1878 work The Bouquet was included in the book Women Painters of the World.
