= List of Belgian women artists =

This is a list of women artists who were born in Belgium or whose artworks are closely associated with that country.

== A ==
- Alix d'Anethan (1849–1921), painter
- Berthe Art (1857–1934), painter
- Amélie van Assche (1804–1880), painter
- Amélie van Assche (fl. 1812–1842), painter
- Isabelle Catherine van Assche (fl. 1812–1840), landscape painter
- Valentine Avoh (fl. 2010), fashion designer
- Evelyne Axell (1935–1972), pop painter

== B ==
- Rachel Baes (1912–1983), surrealist painter
- Josette Baujot (1920–2009), comics artist
- Maggy Baum (born 1931), fashion designer
- Euphrosine Beernaert (1831–1901), painter
- Marie de Bièvre (1856–1909), still life painter
- Anna Boch (1848–1936), painter
- Delphine Boël (born 1968), multimedia artist
- Anne Bonnet (1908–1960), painter
- Isabelle de Borchgrave (born 1946), artist, sculptor
- Virginie Bovie (1821–1888), painter
- Veronique Branquinho (born 1973), fashion designer
- Cris Brodahl (born 1963), artist
- Anna Francisca de Bruyns (1604–1675), Baroque painter

== C ==
- Cécile Cauterman (1882–1957), artist working in charcoal, pencil and pastel
- Sophie Cauvin (born 1968), painter
- Caroline Chariot-Dayez (born 1958), hyperrealistic painter
- May Claerhout (1939–2016), painter
- Marie-Lambertine Coclers (1761–after 1815), engraver, pastellist
- Claire Colinet (1880–1950), Belgian-born French sculptor
- Marie Collart (1842–1911), painter
- Diana Coomans (1861–1952), painter
- Heva Coomans (1860–1939), painter
- Kitty Crowther (born 1970), illustrator, children's writer
- Nine Culliford (1930–2016), comics artist

== D ==
- Alix d'Anethan (1848–1921), painter
- Marleen Daniels (born 1958), photographer
- Louise Danse (1867–1948), etcher, painter
- Marie Danse (1866–1942), etcher, painter
- Berlinde De Bruyckere (born 1964), painter, sculptor
- Anna Francisca de Bruyns (1604–1675), Flemish Baroque painter
- Anouk De Clercq (born 1971), multimedia artist
- Jos De Cock (1934–2010), painter, water colorist, etcher and sculptor
- Louise De Hem (1866–1922), painter
- Marie De Keyser (1815–1879), painter
- Éliane de Meuse (1899–1993), painter
- Nelly Degouy (1910–1979), painter
- Carole Dekeijser (1959–2008), figurative painter
- Edith Dekyndt (born 1960), visual artist
- Angele Delanghe (born 1971), fashion designer
- Solange Delgleize (1925–2008), painter
- Marie de Latour (1750–1834), engraver, painter
- Princess Delphine of Belgium (born 1968), painter
- Ann Demeulemeester (born 1959), fashion designer
- Gerda Dendooven (born 1962), illustrator
- Jennifer Des (born 1975), photographer
- Honorine Deschrijver (1887–1977), fashion designer
- Marthe Donas (1885–1967), abstract and cubist painter
- Cécile Douard (1866–1941), painter, sculptor
- Arpaïs Du Bois (born 1973), draughtsman, painter
- Lili Dujourie (born 1941), visual artist
- Marianne Duvivier (born 1958), comics artist

== E ==
- Anneke Eussen (born 1978), drawing, sculpture, photography and installation

== F ==
- Maria Faydherbe (1587–1643), Flemish sculptor
- Magda Francot (born 1942), painter
- Martine Franck (1938–2012), documentary and portrait photographer
- Isabella Francken (early 17th century), Flemish painter
- Alice Frey (1895–1981), painter
- Cindy Frey (born 1975), professional photographer
- Suzon Fuks (born 1959), contemporary artist and choreographer

== G ==
- Élisa de Gamond (1804–1869), painter
- Nathalie Gassel (born 1964), writer and photographer
- Fanny Geefs (1807–1883), painter
- Rosa Gilissen-Vanmarcke (born 1944), sculptor
- Ketty Gilsoul-Hoppe (1868–1939), painter
- Ingrid Godon (born 1958), illustrator
- Nicole Van Goethem (1941–2000), illustrator
- Jane Graverol (1905–1984), surrealist painter
- Marthe Guillain (1890–1974), painter

== H ==
- Jeanne Hebbelynck (1891–1959), illustrator, designer
- Catharina van Hemessen (1528–after 1587), Flemish Renaissance painter
- Désirée zu Hohenlohe-Langenburg (fl 2013), fashion designer
- Francine Holley (1919–2020), painter
- Jenny Hoppe (1870–1934), German-Belgian painter
- Jeanne Hovine (1888–1992), comics artist
- Marie Howet (1897–1984), expressionist painter

== I ==
- Ilah (born 1971), comics artist

== J ==
- Lucie Jacquart (1852–1956), painter

== K ==
- Anna Kernkamp (1868–1947), painter
- Claire Kerwin (1919–2005), visual artist
- Marie De Keyser (1815–1879), painter
- Sanam Khatibi (born 1979), contemporary artist
- Adele Kindt (1804–1884), painter
- Magda Kint (born 1936), painter
- Solange Knopf (born 1957), visual artist
- Aglaia Konrad (born 1960), fine arts photographer

== L ==
- Marie-Jo Lafontaine (born 1950), sculptor, video artist
- Mercédès Legrand (1893–1945), Spanish-born Belgian painter, sculptor, poet

== M ==
- Anna Martinowa Zarina (1907–1984), Latvian-born Belgian artist, educator
- Marthe Massin (1860–1931), painter
- Willia Menzel (1907–1995), sculptor, graphic designer
- Fernande de Mertens (1850–1924), Belgian-French painter
- Naziha Mestaoui (born 1975), environmental artist
- Georgette Meunier (1859–1951), still life painter
- Clémence Michel (1849–1925), painter
- Cécile Miguel (1921–2001), painter
- Isabel Miramontes (born 1962), Spanish-Belgian sculptor
- Jenny Montigny (1875–1937), painter
- Camille van Mulders (1868–1949), still life painter
- Betsy Muus (1891–1986), sculptor

== N ==
- May Néama (1917–2007), painter, illustrator, sculptor, graphic artist
- Viviane Nicaise (born 1952), cartoonist, colorist
- Suzanne Nijs (1902–1985), sculptor

== O ==
- Maria Jacoba Ommeganck (1760–1849), Flemish animal painter

== P ==
- Fanny Paelinck-Horgnies (1805–1887), painter
- Catharina Peeters (1615–1676), Flemish Baroque painter
- Clara Peeters (1594–c.1657), Flemish Baroque painter
- Katharina Pepijn (1619–1688), Flemish painter
- Cathy Pill (born 1981), fashion designer
- Marie-Françoise Plissart (born 1954), photographer and video artist
- Sophie Podolski (1953–1974), poet, graphic artist
- Jacqui Poncelet (born 1947), ceramist, painter, sculptor
- Marguerite Putsage (1868–1946), painter

== R ==
- Adele Renault (born 1988), visual artist, muralist
- Alice Ronner (1857–1906), painter
- Augusta Roszmann (1859–1945), painter

== S ==
- Elisabeth de Saedeleer (1902–1972), textile artist
- Ann Salens (1940–1994), fashion designer
- Yvonne Serruys (1873–1953), painter, sculptor
- Elza Severin (1913–1988), illustrator
- Marie-Elisabeth Simons, painter

== T ==
- Françoise Taylor (1920–2007), engraver
- Levina Teerlinc (1510s–1576), painter
- Jeanne Tercafs (1898–1944), sculptor
- Maria Theresa van Thielen (1640–1706), Flemish Baroque painter
- Kaat Tilley (1959–2012), fashion designer
- Ana Torfs (born 1963), contemporary artist
- Jeanne Toussaint (1887–1976), Belgian-born French jeweller
- Joëlle Tuerlinckx (born 1958), contemporary artist

== V ==
- Martha Van Coppenolle (1912–2004), illustrator
- Maria Van Humbeeck (1888–1969), painter, pastellist and graphic artist
- Myriam Van Imschoot (born 1969), contemporary artist
- Anne-Mie van Kerckhoven (born 1951), contemporary artist
- Germaine Van Parys (1893–1983), early photojournalist
- Gertruida van Veen (1602–1643), painter
- Marguerite Verboeckhoven (1865–1949), painter
- Johanna Vergouwen (1630–1714), Flemish Baroque painter
- Mayken Verhulst (1518–1599), Flemish miniaturist, watercolour painter
- Eva Vermandel (born 1974), photographer
- Katrien Vermeire (born 1979), photographer and contemporary artist
- Gabrielle Vincent (1928–2000), children's writer, illustrator

== W ==
- Monique Watteau (born 1929), painter, illustrator
- Michaelina Wautier (1617–1689), Baroque painter
- Anna De Weert (1867–1950), painter
- Elisabeth Wesmael (1861–1953), graphic artist
- Cindy Wright (born 1972), painter
- Juliette Wytsman (1866–1925), Impressionist painter

== Y ==
- Catarina Ykens (I) (1608–after 1666), Flemish still life painter
- Catarina Ykens (II) (born 1659), Flemish still life painter
