= Cauvin =

Cauvin is a surname. Notable people with the surname include:

- André Cauvin (1907–2004), Belgian documentary film director
- Gérard Cauvin (died 1531), father of Protestant Reformer John Calvin
- Jacques Cauvin (1930–2001), French archaeologist
- Patrick Cauvin (1932–2010), French writer
- Raoul Cauvin (born 1938), Belgian comics writer
- Sophie Cauvin (born 1968), Belgian painter

== See also ==
- Cauvin Bank, wholly submerged atoll structure in the Southern Part Chagos Archipelago
- John Calvin (born Jehan Cauvin in 1509–1564), French theologian
