= Christophe Plantin Prize =

Belgian civilian prize

The Christophe Plantin Prize (French: Prix Christoffel Plantin), is a Belgian civilian prize, intended to reward a Belgian citizen who resides abroad, who has made significant contributions to cultural, artistic or scientific activities.

Named after noted printer Christophe Plantin, the prize was created in 1968 on the initiative of:

- Dr. Baron Ludo van Bogaert, doctor
- Baron Roger Avermaete, writer
- Hugo van Kuyck, architect
- Maurits Naessens, banker
- OJ Van de Perre, industrialist

Funded by voluntary contributions, the prize consists of a 10,000 € fund and a medal created by Antwerp artist May Néama. On one side the medal has a portrait of Christoffel Plantin, accompanied by his statement: "I have more hope in posteriority than in the current world population." To the reverse is an old picture of Antwerp quays, with a compass and another statement of Plantin: "Labore and Constantia."

== Winners ==
Year	Winner	Art	Resides	Notes
1968	Armand HENNEUSE	Poetry	(France) Lyon	
1969	Antoon VOLLEMAERE	Mayan paleography	(Burundi) Bujumbura	
1970	Albert VAN DEN BRANDEN, S.J.	Theology	(Lebanon) Lebanese University	
1971	Pierre LEON	Music	(West Germany) Bonn Opera	
1972	Jean DEVAUX	Arts and Ballet	Guatemala	
1973	Jan YOORS	Artist	(United States) New York City	
1974	Pierre RIJCKMANS	Sinologist	(Australia) Australian National University	
1975	Robert VLIEGEN	Music	(Japan) Osaka College of Music	
1976	Paul DETIENNE, S.J.	Languages	India	Author and Bengali translator
1977	Claude ALARD	Sculptor	(France) Bourges	
1978	Mgr. Jose RUYSSCHAERT	Religion	(Vatican City) Vatican	1965 - vice-prefect, Vatican library 1971 - Honorary chaplain to Pope Paul VI
1979	Professor Dr. Karel MAERTENS	Medicine	(Zaire) University of Kinshasa	
1980	Professor Pierre van RUTTEN	Ethetics and semantics	(Canada) University of Ottawa	
1981	Henri R. LERIBAUX	Nuclear science	(United States) Texas A&M University	
1982	Professor B. HENDRICKX	History	(South Africa) University of Johannesburg	
1983	Philippe FALISSE	Music	India	traditional music of Dhrupad
1984	Charles L. SCHEPENS	Medicine	United States	
1985	Edouard VERSTEYLEN	Archeology	(Peru) Museo Nacional de Arqueología Antropología e Historia del Perú	
1986	Doctor Gabrielle WILLE	Drug addiction	(Colombia) Universidad del Norte	
1987	Luc CROEGAERT, S.J.	African studies	Africa	
1988	Nicole DACOS	Philosophy	(Italy) Academia Belgica	
1989	Doctor Ghislaine GODENNE	Medicine	(United States) University of Maryland, College Park	
1990	Willem A. Grootaers, C.I.C.M.	Dialect	(Taiwan) Fu Jen Catholic University and (Japan) Sophia University	Japanese women
1991	Jan OF YOUR	Philosophy	(Mexico) Academia of Investigaciòn Científica Mexican	
1992	Doctor Emile L. Boulpaep	Medicine	(United States) Yale University	
1993	Doctor Marc R. of LEVAL	Medicine	(United Kingdom) Great Ormond Street Hospital	
1994	Doctor Lilyan Kesteloot	Culture and litereature of Africa	(Senegal) University of Dakar	
1995	Ferdinand of TRAZEGNIES there GRANDA	Lawyer	(Peru) Ambassador	
1998	Doctor Jan Modest Quaegebuer	Medicine	(United States) Columbia University	
1999	Robert Cailliau		(Switzerland) CERN	co-creator of the World Wide Web
2000	Professor Lutgarde Buydens	Pharmacology	(Netherlands) University of Nijmegen	
2001	Robert Casteels	Performing Arts	(Singapore) LASALLE College of the Arts	
2002	Pierre De Meyts	Medicine	(Denmark) Hagedorn Research Institute	
2003	Professor Eduardo Dargent Chamot	History of Nutrition	(United States) St. Mary's University	
2004	Professor Christian Wellekens	Computer voice recognition	(France) Institut Eurécom	
2005	Professor Hervé Bourlard	Computer sciences	(Switzerland) École Polytechnique Fédérale de Lausanne	
2006	Professor Dr. Bart Willem Kempenaers		(Germany) Max Planck Institute	
2007	Dirk van Braeckel	Automotive design	(United Kingdom) Bentley Motors	Design Bentley Continental GTC
2008	Professor Patrick De Deckker	Research/Lecturer Past climates, earth's history	(Australia) Australian National University	
2009	Professor Jo Haazen	Musicus, beiaardier	Staatsuniversiteit van Sint-Petersburg, (Russia); Faculteit voor Vergelijkende Godsdienstwetenschappen, (Belgium)	
2010	Professor Jean-Pierre Danthine	Econoom	Zwitserse Nationale Bank, (Switzerland)	
2011	Catherine Geens	Bedrijfsmanager	Fundación Carlos de Amberes, (Spain)	
2012	Koen Sevenants		vzw Morning Tears, (China)	
2013	An Van Camp	Kunsthistoricus, conservator	British Museum, (United Kingdom)	
2014	Professor H. Daniel Wagner	Materiaalkundige	Weizmann Instituut van Wetenschappen, (Israel)	
2015	Bernard Kervyn	Ontwikkelingswerker	Mekong Plus, (Vietnam)	
2016	Chris Dercon	Curator en museumdirecteur	Tate Modern, (United Kingdom); Volksbühne, (Germany)	
2017	Professor Hilde De Reuse	Onderzoeker microbiologie	Institut Pasteur, (France)	
2018	Dr. Piet Noë	Oogarts	Rwanda Charity Eye Hospital,	
2019	Gilbert Deflo	Operaregisseur	wereldwijd	
2021	Veerle Sterken	Ruimtewetenschapper	ETH Zürich (Switzerland)	
2022	Christophe Cox	Sociaal ondernemer	APOPO, (Tanzania)	
