= Amélie van Assche =

Belgian painter

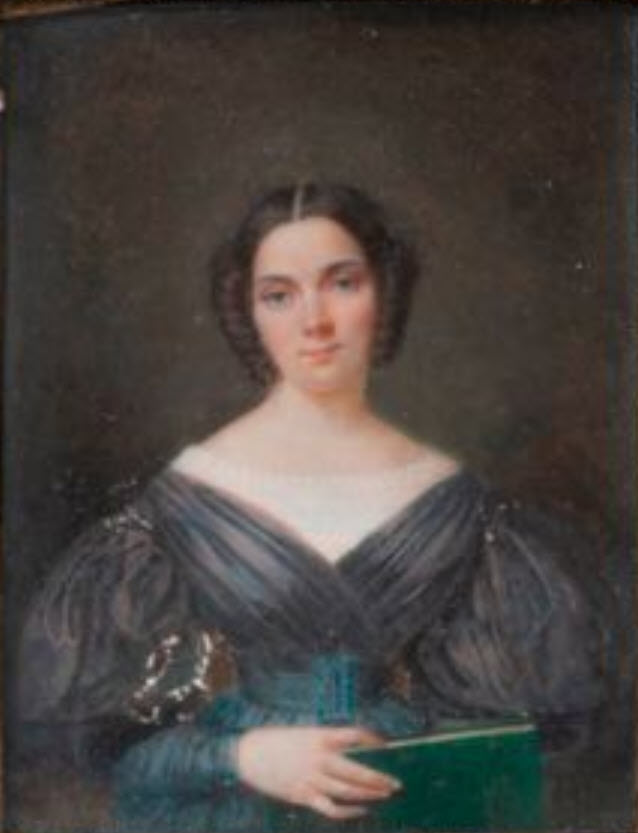
Portrait of a Young Woman (c.1840)

Amélie van Assche (1804–1880) was a Belgian painter. She was the daughter of Henri Jean van Assche, police commissaris. Her first teachers were Miss F. Lagarenine and D'Antissier. She later went to Paris, where she spent some time as a pupil of Millet. At the opening of the 19th century, the "Art of the Miniature" was cultivated—as expressed at the time—by Hortense van Baerlen, Marie-Josèphe Dargent, and Assche. She made her debut at Ghent in 1820, and in Brussels in 1821, with watercolors and pastels, and some of her miniatures figured in the various exhibitions at Brussels between 1830 and 1848, and in Ghent between 1835 and 1838. Her portraits, which are thought to be very good likenesses, are also admirable in color, drawing, and modelling; and her portrait of Leopold I., which she painted in 1839, won for her the appointment at court. She was a portrait painter and court painter to Queen Louise Marie of Belgium.

It should also be noted that, contrary to popular belief, Amélie Van Assche is not Isabelle Catherine van Assche's sister. The latter was a pupil of her uncle Henri Van Assche, a landscape painter.
