= Maximilien Lambert Gelissen =

Belgian painter

Maximilien Lambert Gelissen (27 February 1786, Brussels – 19 March 1867) was a Belgian painter. He was a pupil of a certain Rubens of Brussels for drawing, and of Henri Van Assche for painting. He painted mainly landscapes and genre paintings. His works are kept in many collections, including the Royal Museums of Fine Arts of Belgium and the Museum of Fine Arts, Ghent. In 1820 he won the prize for landscape from the Royal Academy of Science, Letters and Fine Arts of Belgium.
