= Miramontes =

Miramontes is a Spanish-language surname. People with the surname include:

- Isabel Miramontes (born 1962), Spanish-born Belgian sculptor
- Jonathan Miramontes (born 1988), Mexican professional footballer
- Luis E. Miramontes (1925–2004), Mexican chemist
- Matías Miramontes (born 1981), Argentine footballer
- David Fernández (footballer, born 1976) (David Fernández Miramontes), Spanish footballer
- Luis Suárez (footballer, born 1935) (Luis Suárez Miramontes), Spanish footballer and manager

== See also ==
- Rancho Miramontes, Mexican land grant in present-day San Mateo County, California
- Miramonte (disambiguation)
