= Kint =

Kint or KINT may refer to:

== People ==
- Cor Kint (1920–2002), Dutch backstroke swimmer
- Magda Kint (born 1936), Belgian artist
- Marcel Kint (1914–2002), Belgian road bicycle racer
- Tõnis Kint (died 1991), Estonian politician
- Roger Kint (Keyser Söze), a character in the 1995 film The Usual Suspects

== Other uses ==
- KINT-TV, a television station (channel 26) licensed to El Paso, Texas, United States
- KINT-FM, a radio station (93.9 FM) licensed to El Paso, Texas, United States
- KINT-IRGT, the Belgian Royal Institute for the Sustainable Management of Natural Resources and the Promotion of Clean Technology
- The ICAO code for Smith Reynolds Airport in Winston-Salem, North Carolina, United States
