= Masao Yamamoto =

Japanese photographer

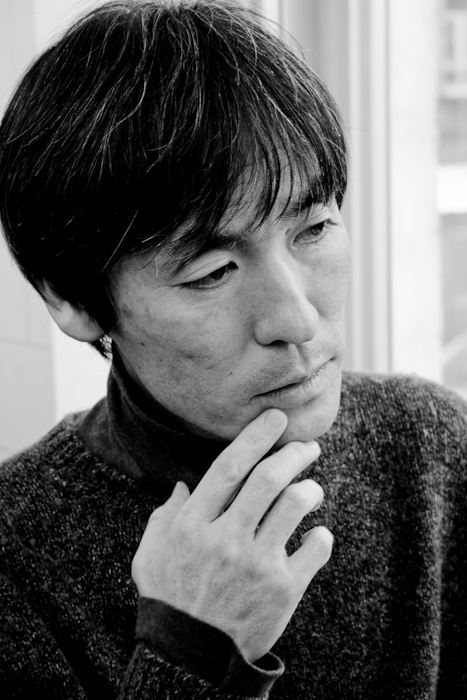
- Yamamoto in Moscow (2009)

Masao Yamamoto (山本昌男, Yamamoto Masao; born 1957) is a Japanese freelance photographer known for his small photographs, which seek to individualize the photographic prints as objects.

== Biography ==
Yamamoto was born in 1957 in Gamagori City in Aichi Prefecture, Japan. He began his art studies as a painter, studying oil painting under Goro Saito in his native city. He presently uses photography to capture images evoking memories. He blurs the border between painting and photography, by experimenting with printing surfaces. He dyes, tones (with tea), paints on, and tears his photographs. His subjects include still-lives, nudes, and landscapes. He also makes installation art with his small photographs to show how each print is part of a larger reality.

== Exhibitions ==
- é, PDX Contemporary Art, Portland, OR, 2005, Gallery Sincerite, Tyohashi, 2006; Mizuma Art Gallery, Tokyo, 2006.
- Installations, HackelBury Fine Art, London; 2006
- Nakazora, Galerie Camera Obscura, Paris, 2006; Nakazora Galerie Gabriel Rolt, Amsterdam, 2007; Quinzaine photographique Nantes, France, 2007.
- Yamamoto Masao, Galleria Carla Sozzani, Milano, 2007; PDX Contemporary Art, Portland, OR, 2007; Craig Krull Gallery, Santa Monica, January 2008.
- Kawa=Flow. Yancey Richardson Gallery, New York. September–October 2008; PDX Contemporary Art, Portland, OR, 2009; Fifty One Fine art photography, Antwerp, Belgium, 2009; Craig Krull Gallery, Santa Monica, January 2011.

== Publications ==
- A box of Ku, USA: Nazraeli Press, 1998.
- Nakazora. USA: Nazraeli Press, 2001.
- The Path of Green Leaves. One Picture Book 16. Tucson, AZ: Nazraeli Press, 2002. ISBN 9781590050484. English and Japanese.
- Santoka. Japan: Harunatsuakifuyu sousho, 2003.
- Omizuao. USA: Nazraeli Press, 2003.
- Small Things in Silence. Barcelona: RM, 2014. ISBN 9788415118831. With a text by Jacobo Siruela, "Nature's messenger = El mensajero de la naturaleza". Text in English and Spanish.
- é. USA: Nazraeli Press, 2005.
- Fujisan. One Picture Book 48. Portland, OR: Nazraeli Press, 2008. ISBN 9781590052235. Edition of 500 copies.
- Yamamoto Masao. Prism Series Book 1. Cape Cod, MA:: 21st Editions, 2011. With a Text and a poem by John Wood.
- 川KAWA=Flow. Japan: Kochuten Books, 2011.
- Where we met. Belgium: Lannoo Publishers, 2011. A collaboration with Belgian drawer and painter Arpaïs Du Bois.
