= Pierre De Meyts =

Belgian physician and biochemist

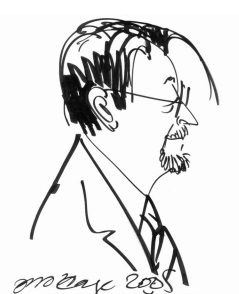
- Born: 17 November 1944; Verviers, Belgium
- Died: 7 July 2025 (aged 80); Kraainem, Belgium
- Education: University of Liège
- Known for: Diabetogenes, Negative cooperativity of the insulin receptor
- Awards: Christophe Plantin Prize, Quinquennial Joseph Maisin Scientific Prize, Belgium
- Scientific career
- Fields: Hormone-receptor interaction of peptide hormones, physiopathogenesis of diabetes
- Workplaces: Hôpital de Bavière; Vrije Universiteit Brussel, Université Catholique de Louvain; De Duve Institute, Brussels; Beckman Research Institute, California; Hagedorn Research Institute, Copenhagen; University of Copenhagen

Pierre De Meyts (1944-2025) was a Belgian physician and biochemist known for his research on fine chemical and kinetic aspects of ligand-receptor interaction, subunit assembly, and specific metabolic (as well as mitogenic) effects of hormones typically causing receptor tyrosine kinase activation such as insulin and insulin-like growth factors (IGFs). He has also studied receptor signalling for other peptide hormones such as growth hormone and relaxin, and key pathophysiological aspects of diabetes mellitus. De Meyts held professorial posts for over three decades at several European and United States institutions. After retirement, he returned to Belgium and continued as an emeritus professor in the Science Faculty at the Université Catholique de Louvain, and at the De Duve Institute in Brussels. While living in Denmark (1990-2010) he occupied executive research positions at Novo Nordisk. De Meyts (a.k.a. Chuck) was also known as a science cartoonist.

== Biography ==
De Meyts was born in Verviers (Belgium) in 1944. He attended high school at the Athénée Royal de Verviers, where he read "Humanités Anciennes" (Latin-Mathématiques). In 1969 De Meyts received his MD with honours ("Grande Distinction") from the University of Liège Medical School, and during the subsequent three years he specialized in internal medicine at the Hôpital de Bavière. Soon after he spent three years at NIH as a visiting scientist. During this NIH period, De Meyts became a prominent member of the research group led by Jesse Roth, studying insulin receptors, and authoring a dozen original papers in duly indexed journals. In 1976, after NIH, he returned to Belgium where he occupied academic positions at universities including the Vrije Universiteit Brussel and the International Institute of Cellular and Molecular Pathology (now called "de Duve Institute", Université catholique de Louvain). De Meyts then moved to California (1984-1990), where he joined the Beckman Research Institute of City of Hope, (Duarte) and also taught at the University of Southern California for a short period. Immediately after, De Meyts was recruited by Novo Nordisk where he successively became the director of research at the Hagedorn Research Institute (1990-2000), scientific director of its Receptor Systems Biology Laboratory (2000-2010), and corporate vice-president of the company. During this period in Denmark until 2011 De Meyts simultaneously held academic posts as adjunct professor of experimental endocrinology (2000-2005) and guest lecturer (2007-2011) at the University of Copenhagen Faculty of Health Sciences. Since then De Meyts returned to his home country and founded his own consulting company in Kraainem. He remained professionally active until his death; as a visiting professor at the De Duve Institute, a busy scientific editor and reviewer, and collaborator on several research projects in the USA and the UK.

== Research ==
De Meyts began his research career while a medical student at the University of Liège, collaborating with mentors such as Jean Lecomte and Annie Cession-Fossion in studies of the vascular actions of sympathomimetics. During a three-year visit to NIH starting in 1973, De Meyts got involved in what -by far- would become his major research fields: hormone-receptor interaction of peptide hormones and the study of the physiopathogenesis of diabetes. In the latter field, his article with Steven G. Gray was the first to propose the possible etiological role of epigenetic factors in diabetes. Also, De Meyts's articles first coined the term diabetogenes (1993), a new concept which has gained significant acceptance among independent peers in many countries (France, US, Japan and Denmark). Below is a list of De Meyts's most notable research topics and achievements:

- Growth hormone effects and signalling in adipocytes and IM-9 lymphocytes
- Demonstration of negative cooperativity in insulin and IGF receptors as well as other RTKs and GPCRs
- Delineation of the two receptor binding surfaces of insulin and IGFs
- Molecular basis of mitogenicity of insulin and insulin analogues
- Mathematical model of the insulin and IGF-I receptor based on bivalent crosslinking of a harmonic oscillator (with Vladislav Kiselyov)
- Diabetogenes concept of T2D pathogenesis
- Theoretical analysis of hormone-receptor based drug design in cancer and diabetes

=== Papers ===
De Meyts' most recent papers as a main author include:

- De Meyts, Pierre (2015-04). "Insulin/receptor binding: the last piece of the puzzle? What recent progress on the structure of the insulin/receptor complex tells us (or not) about negative cooperativity and activation". BioEssays: News and Reviews in Molecular, Cellular and Developmental Biology. 37 (4): 389–397. doi:10.1002/bies.201400190. ISSN 1521-1878. PMID 25630923
- De Meyts, Pierre (2016), Feingold, Kenneth R.; Anawalt, Bradley; Boyce, Alison; Chrousos, George (eds.), "The Insulin Receptor and Its Signal Transduction Network", Endotext, South Dartmouth (MA): MDText.com, Inc., PMID 27512793
- De Meyts, Pierre (2016). "Structural basis for the poisonous activity of a predator's venom insulin". Nature Structural & Molecular Biology. 23 (10): 872–874. doi:10.1038/nsmb.3304. ISSN 1545-9985. PMID 27706132
- Rostène, William; De Meyts, Pierre (2021-09-28). "Insulin: A 100-Year-Old Discovery With a Fascinating History". Endocrine Reviews. 42 (5): 503–527. doi:10.1210/endrev/bnab020. ISSN 1945-7189. PMID 34273145
- De Meyts, Pierre (2022): “The Insulin Receptor discovery is 50 years old – Review of the progress achieved” (in French). Biol Aujourd’hui 216 (1-2): 7-28.

== Editorial activity ==
De Meyts was chief specialty editor of Frontiers in Molecular and Structural Endocrinology, associate editor of Frontiers in Systems Biology, and member of the editorial board of the Journal of Biological Chemistry.

== Awards ==
- 1975, Solomon Berson Research and Development Award from the American Diabetes Association
- 1978, Alumni Prize of the "Fondation Universitaire" (Belgium)
- 1979, Diaz Cristobal Prize of the Spanish Diabetes Association (shared with Jesse Roth)
- 1981, Oskar Minkowski Prize of the European Association for the Study of Diabetes
- 1995, Quinquennial Joseph Maisin Scientific Prize for the Biomedical Sciences by the Belgian National Fund for Scientific Research
- 2002, Christophe Plantin Prize, Belgium
- 2004, Gold Medal of 75th Anniversary of "Association des Amis de l’Université de Liège"
- 2005, American Association of Clinical Endocrinologists: Frontiers in Science Award
- 2023, Gordon Research Conferences Lifetime Achievement Award for his contributions to Insulin and IGF research

== Cartoonist ==
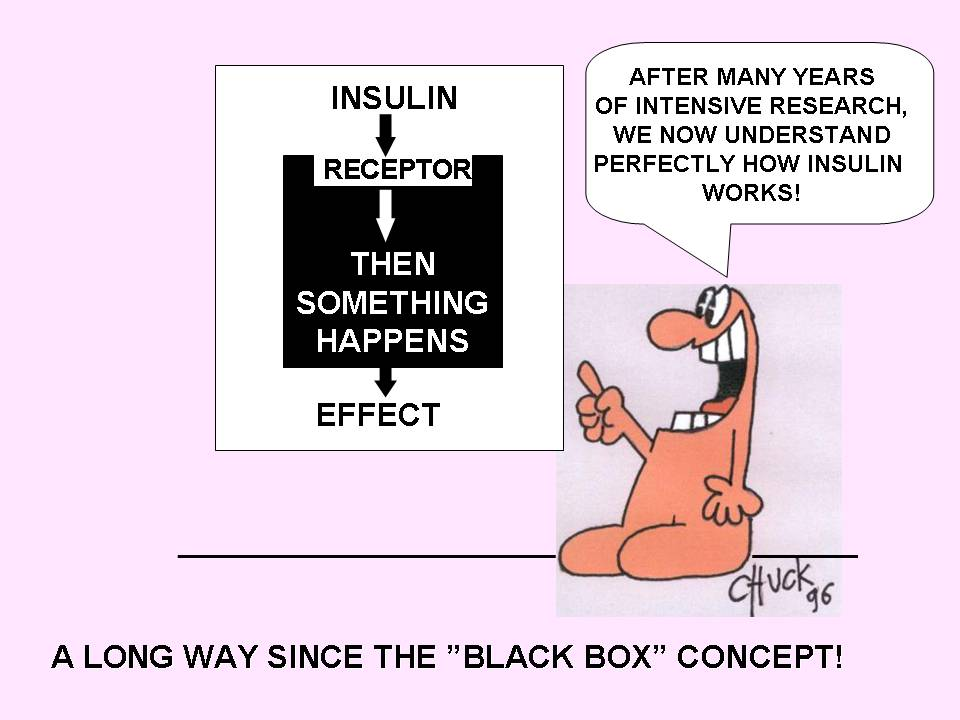
Black-Box concept of insulin action, by Chuck

De Meyts's often iconoclastic cartoons first attained notoriety among francophone readers during the student upheavals occurring in 1968–69. Many of his cartoons and posters from this period are archived and can be consulted at the Institut d’histoire ouvrière, économique et sociale in Seraing. Once a scientist, he began drawing satirical science-cartoons. Many of these have been published in mainstream journals such as Nature, Trends in Biochemical Sciences, and Trends in Pharmacological Sciences.
