= Miramonte =

Miramonte may refer to:

- Miramonte, California, in Fresno County
- Miramonte High School, in Orinda, California
- Miramonte Elementary School, an elementary school within the Los Angeles Unified School District in which child abuse scandals broke in 2012
- Miramonte Natural Area, a protected area in San Miguel County, Colorado, USA
- Iglesia Bautista Miramonte, in San Salvador, El Salvador

== See also ==
- Miramontes, a surname
