= Elza Severin =

Belgian artist

- Born: May 21, 1913; Kalmthout
- Died: May 18, 1988 (aged 74); Antwerp
- Education: Royal academy of Arts in Antwerp, Belgium; Higher institute for fine arts Antwerp
- Known for: Graphic design Wood engraving Illustrator; Interior design Cartoonist
- Spouse: Renaat Braem
- Father: Juliaan Severin

Elza Severin (21 May 1913 – 18 May 1988) was a Belgian artist.

== Early life and education ==
Severin was born on 21 May 1913 in Kalmthout, Belgium. Her father, Juliaan Severin, was a painter and graphic designer. She was surrounded by art and the visual world and so she easily made her way into the art sector. Her father was a teacher and home schooled her and her sister. The homeschooling was in the educational vision of Ovide Decroly, a Belgian doctor, pedagogue, and psychologist who developed a revolutionary education system that assumes that every child is unique, and that a school or teacher had to adapt to the child, and not the other way around. From this artistic and alternative family background, the step into the artistic was easily taken.

In highschool she went to Royal academy of Arts in Antwerp, Belgium and studied painting. Later she went to the higher institute for fine arts Antwerp. Eduard Pellens was her teacher in the woodcutting atelier and Henri van Straeten & Joris Minne were her teachers in the graphic design department. Van Straeten & Minne together with Frans Masereel, Jan-Frans Cantré, Jozef Cantré founded The Five (Les Cinq), a group of graphic artists who renewed Flemish woodcarving. The work of Van Straeten had an unmistakable influence on the style of Elza Severin's work. It's characterised by the urban modern life of the interwar period.

In 1929 she met Renaat Braem in the Academy. They both were members of the Joe English Gilde, a Flemish-humanist-oriented association consisting of art and architectural students. Bream founded it a year earlier. They held debate evenings, lectures and exhibitions. In October 1936 she married Renaat Bream. Elza accompanied him on the study trips abroad to Paris, Bologna, Florence, Rome and Venice.

In the epilogue of the biography of her husband "Het schoonste land ter wereld", Severin wrote with her sense of humor "It must have become clear that I live here with a versatile genius, with his good and less good gifts. But how annoying the world would be if everyone was perfect and always took themselves seriously." With the epilogue she gives a nice insight into the relationship between her and her husband.

In 1941 Elza and Renaat accompanied and joined the resistance movement. Therefore Elza Severin designed cartoons for the anti-nazipropaganda. After the war she officially was recognised as a 'fighter by the clandestine press'. Her cartoons were signed with the pseudonym 'SUS'.

== Career – artwork ==
While studying she worked as a designer and illustrator for various publishers such as Varior, L. Opdebeek, Regenboog, De Vlijt and Van In. She designed Illustration and book covers for children books. Elza was gifted for the use of typography. The children's magazine Zonneland, and Vlaamse Filmpjes are examples she made several illustrations for.

Elza Severin was an independent graphic designer from around 1930 till 1940. She made illustrations for children and youth books, letterheads, occasional printing, posters, advertising and a lot of ex libris. Elza signed her work often with 'Els Everin' or 'Els'.

The design for the commercial expenses formally differ greatly from the expressionist woodcuts that she performed as a free work. Her woodcarvings are often signed with the monogram 'ES'. Elza, as a graphic design artist, she tried to make her name in the art world and from 1933 till 1938 she took part in exhibitions for it. Some of them were group exhibitions but she also had solo exhibitions. In the Sint-Nicolaasplaats she once had an exhibition together with her father. Juliaan Severin was a secretary of the art circle AKOS and he arranged the exhibition place in de Sint-Nikolaasplaats. In 1933 she was selected for an international exhibition for woodcuts in Warsaw and Kraków.

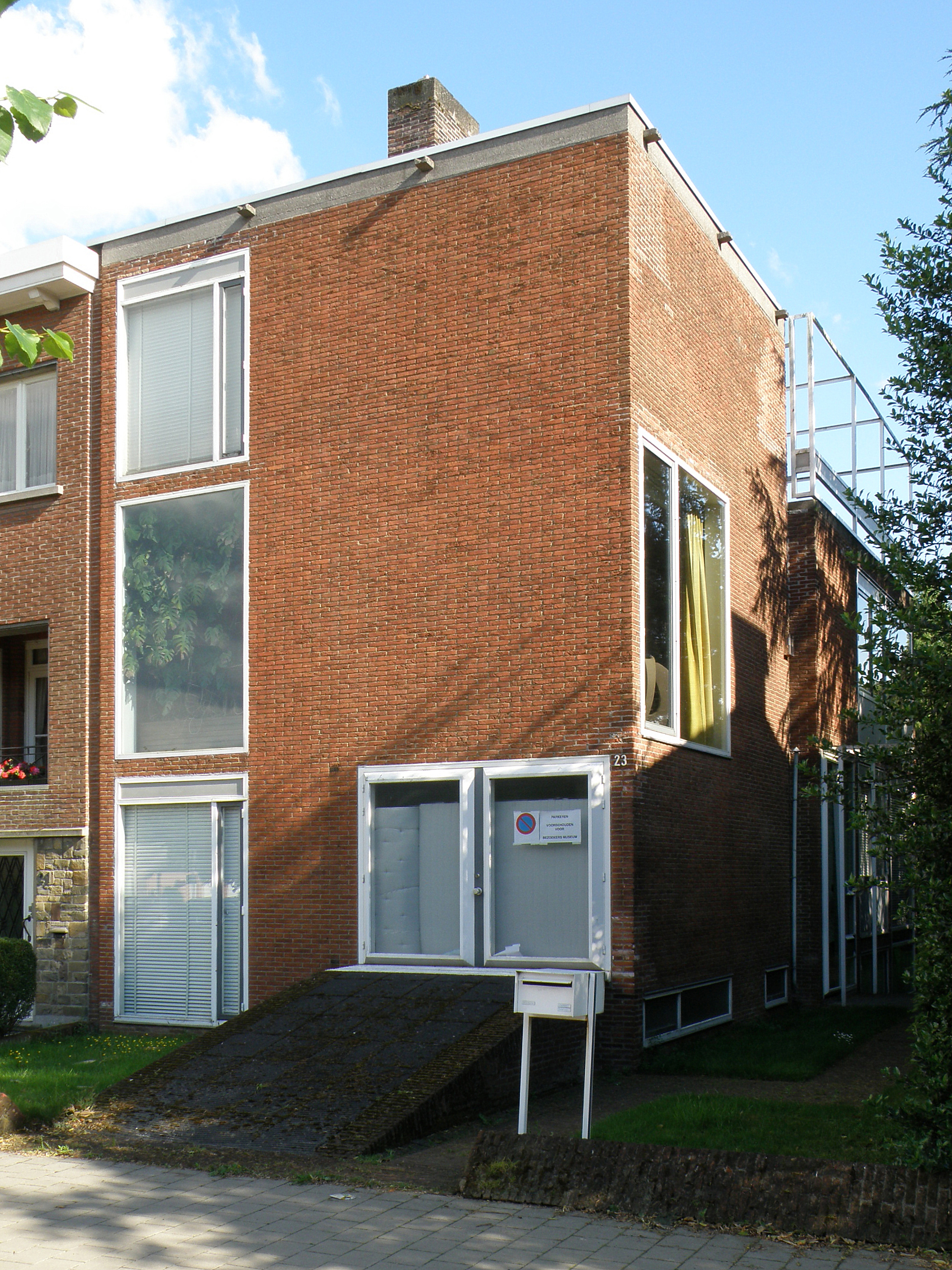
Deurne Braem-huis Menegemlei 23

From 1940 she was more and more involved in the business of her husband Renaat Bream. She did the administration of his architectural firm, but helped as well with the design of the interiour of the buildings and the decorative elements of the projects. She designed several sculptures, tiles, tapestries, and pillows for the interior.

In the youth hostel 't pannekoekhuis in Nijlen, 1950, she designed a mural. In the rectorat of the Free University of Brussels (VUB), 1976–1980, she also designed and placed a mural. This last one she needed to perform it herself because of the lack of budget. Elza collected all of her journals and notes of herself.

In 1950 Renaat Bream designed their house called "Huis Braem-Severin". Elza Severin helped with the interior design. It is located in Deurne, Antwerp, Menegemlei 23. The house can now be visited as a museum. There you find a collection of letters and wood blocks, and plaster figurines of Elza. The exterior and interior are based on the natural ratio of the golden ratio. The style of the building belongs to the modernist architecture movement. The work of Elza Severin also belongs to the modernist movement. When they bought their house Renaat was thinking about the aesthetics and Elza was thinking about practical things. "Does this window have to go open or not? Should it better be a sliding door?" she wrote in the epilogue of the biography of her husband "Het schoonste land ter wereld".

== Exhibitions ==
1930s

- 1933 International exhibition on Wood carving, Warsaw & Kraków
- 1934 Sint-Nicolaasplaats, exhibition space for young graphic designers, group exhibition 'Wit en Zwart'
- 1935 solo exhibition, Sint-Nicolaasplaats, exhibition space for young graphic designers
- 1938 exhibition with her father, Sint-Nicolaasplaats

== Sources ==
- Norbert Poulain, Illustratrices uit het interbellum: Jenny Teeuwen, Elsa Van Hagedoren, Elza Severin, In: Interbellum 28/1, Gent, 2008
- Jo Braeken (ed.), Renaat Bream 1910–2001 Architect, Vlaams Instituut voor Onroerend Erfgoed en ASA Publishers, Brussel, 2010.
