= Roger Avermaete =

Belgian writer

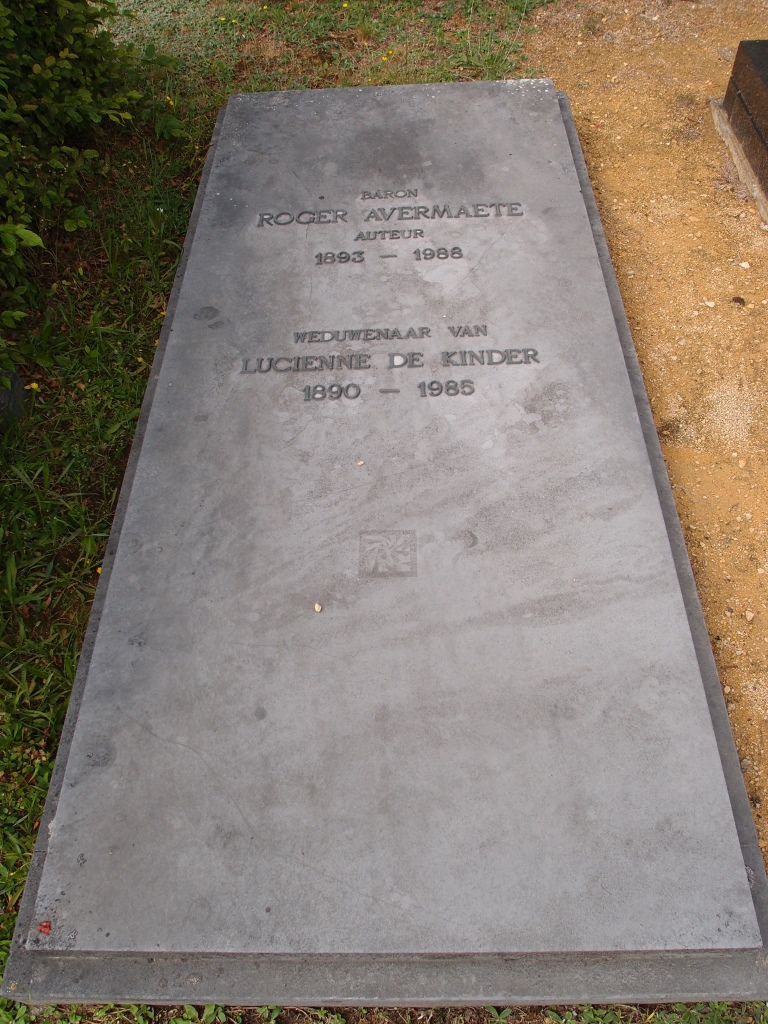
Grave of Roger Avermaete in Schoonselhof, Antwerp

Roger Avermaete (1893 in Antwerp – 1988) was a Belgian writer who wrote in Dutch and French.

In 1968, he was part of the cross-arts team which created the Christophe Plantin Prize.

== See also ==
- Belgian literature

== Sources ==
- Roger Avermaete
