= Clémence Michel =

Belgian artist

- Born: 17 November 1849; Charleroi
- Died: 16 October 1925 (aged 75); Jette
- Known for: Painting

Clémence Michel (Charleroi, 17 November 1849 - Jette, 16 October 1925) was a Belgian artist. She worked in Brussels, especially in Schaerbeek, where she had a studio at rue des Ailes no. 58.

== Personal life ==
Clémence Michel was married to symbolist painter Antoine Lacroix (Wavre, 1845 - Schaerbeek, 1896). She was also his student.

== Work ==
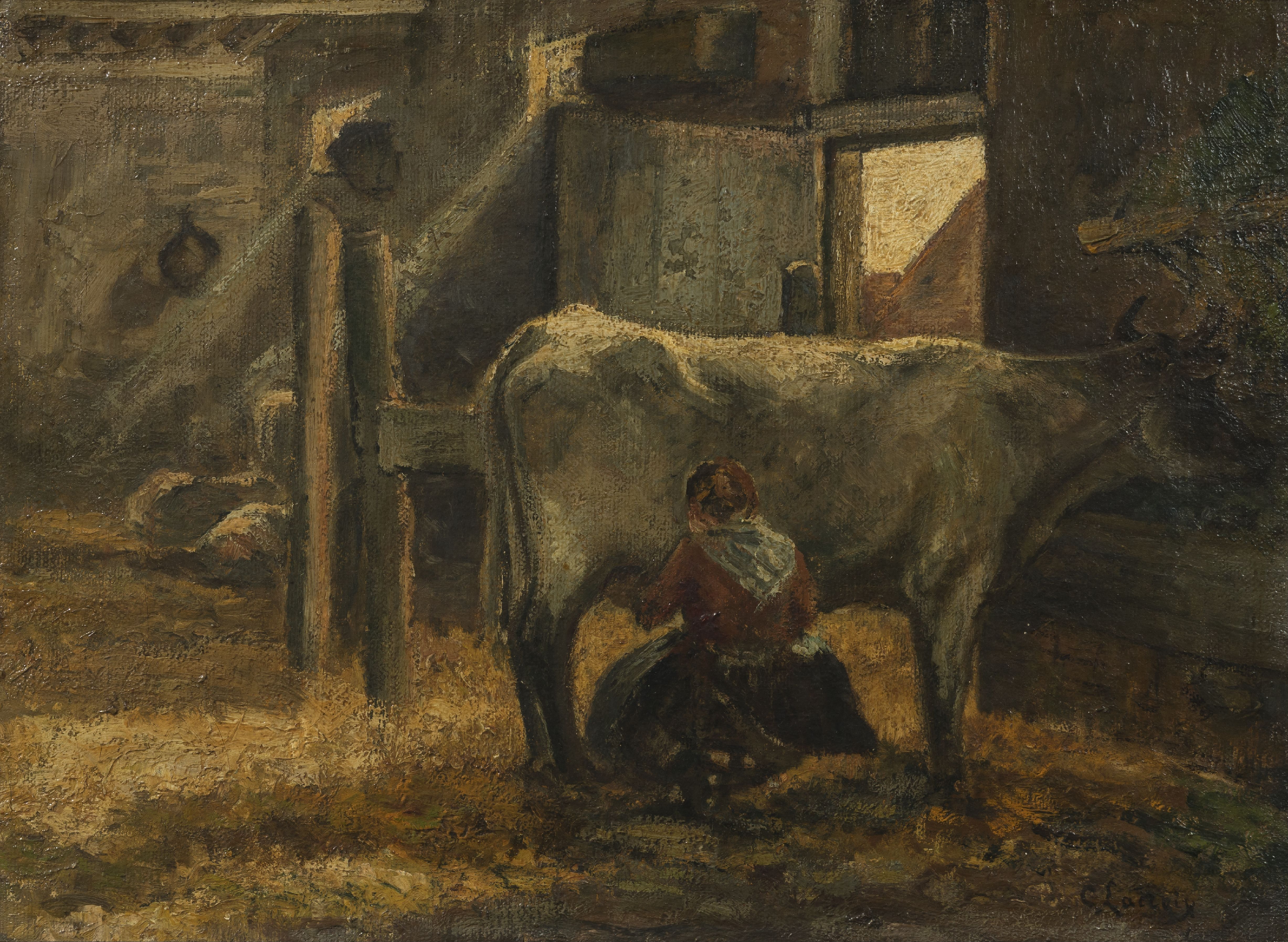
La Traite (Clémence Michel, collection: Municipality of Saint-Gilles, photographer: Barbara Felgenhauer (KIK-IRPA))

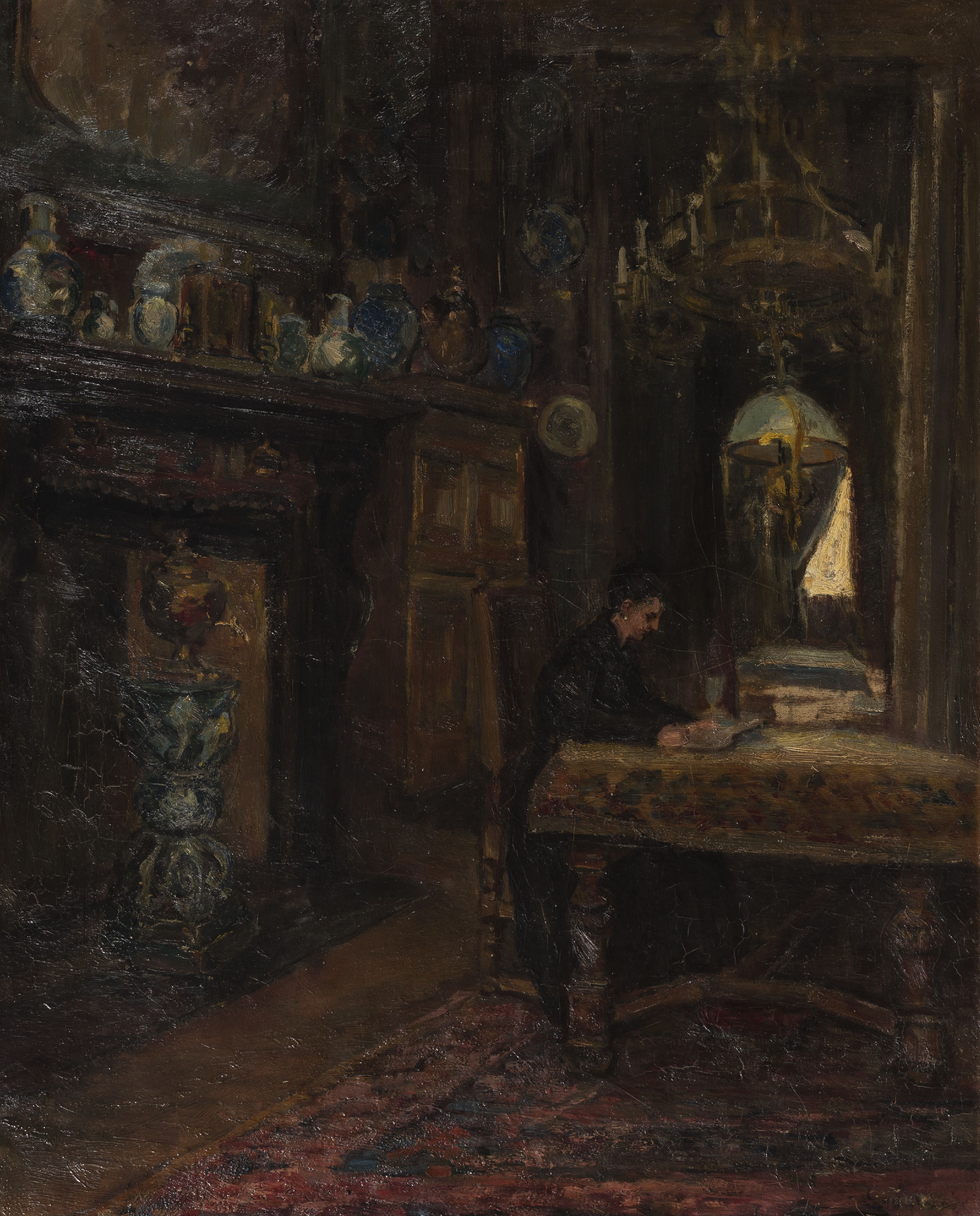
Femme mangeant dans la salle à manger du Musée Speekaert (Clémence Michel, 1916, collection: Municipality of Saint-Gilles, photographer: Barbara Felgenhauer (KIK-IRPA))

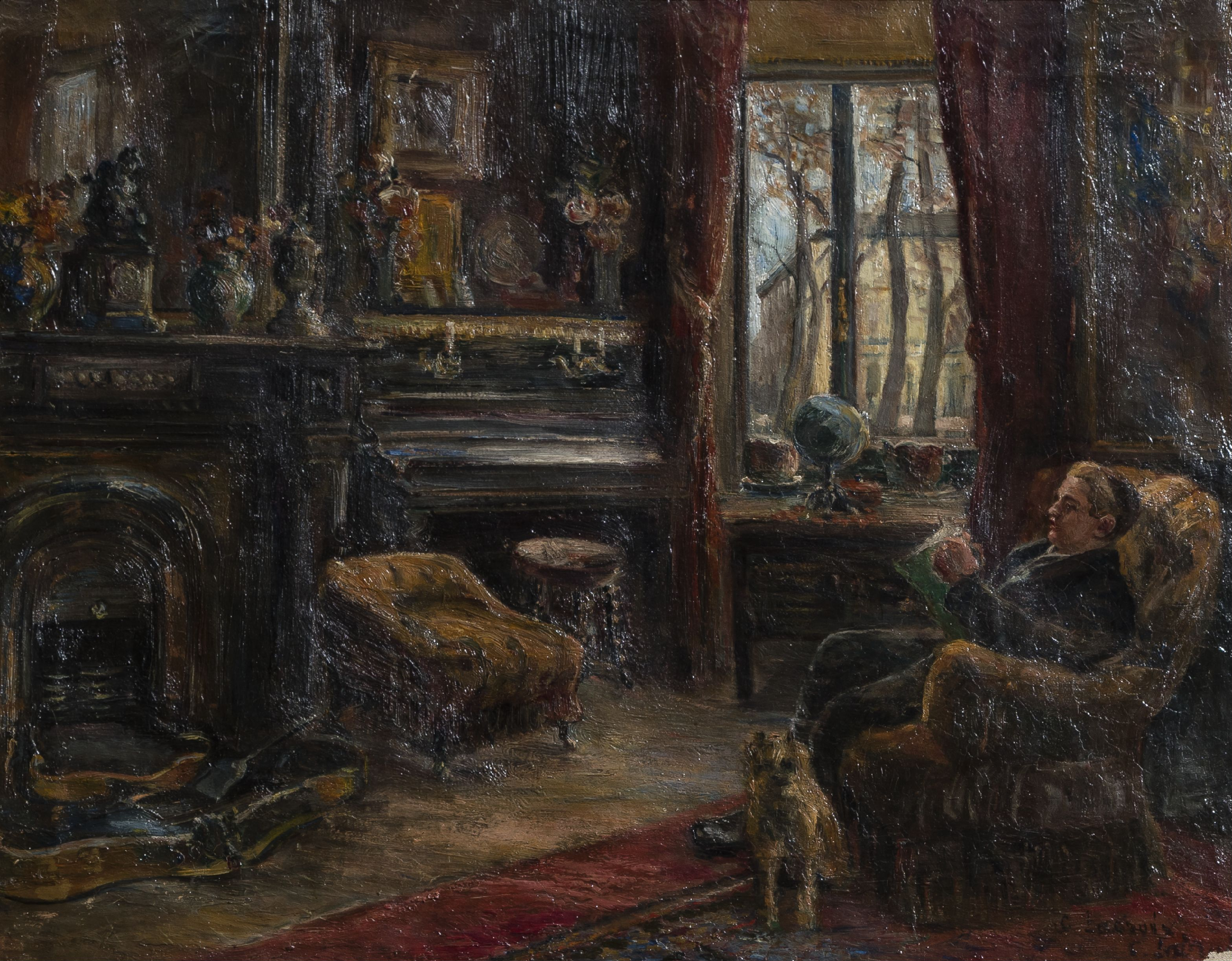
Homme lisant dans le salon du Musée Speekaert (Clémence Michel, 1916, collection: Municipality of Saint-Gilles, photographer: Barbara Felgenhauer (KIK-IRPA))

Clémence Michel is known for her painted seascapes, landscapes, farms and interiors. Her works are characterised by their (monochrome) use of colour, their free and vague style and their clever composition. She excels in portraying the turmoil of the sea using thick and vibrant brushstrokes. Clémence Michel also made several paintings of the Kattendijkdok in the port of Antwerp.

Her oeuvre includes the following paintings:

- Kattendijkdok in Antwerpen;
- La Route;
- La Traite;
- Femme mangeant dans la salle à manger du Musée Speekaert (1916);
- Homme lisant dans le salon du Musée Speekaert (1916);
- Havenzicht;
- Bassin de Kattendijck à Anvers;
- Ancienne église Saint-Servais (1905);
- Ancien château vert;
- Bois de sapins;
- Port de pêche à marée basse;
- Charleroi - Le Pays de Liège;
- Jeunes filles dans la cour de France;
- Vue de ferme.

== Artists' associations ==
Clémence Michel was active in several artists' associations: she was a member of L'Essor and a founding member of Pour l'Art.

== Exhibitions ==
For thirty years, Clémence Michel has regularly exhibited at Pour l'Art. She has participated in, among others, Pour l'Art. XVIe Exposition Annuelle in 1908, Exposition Générale des Beaux-Arts / Salon Triennale in 1914 and the twenty-fifth salon Pour l'Art in 1923. Her painting Kattendijkdok in Antwerpen was on display in, among others, the exhibition De Schelde in de schilderkunst van midden 19de tot midden 20ste eeuw (Stedelijk Museum Sint-Niklaas, 1986).

== Collections ==
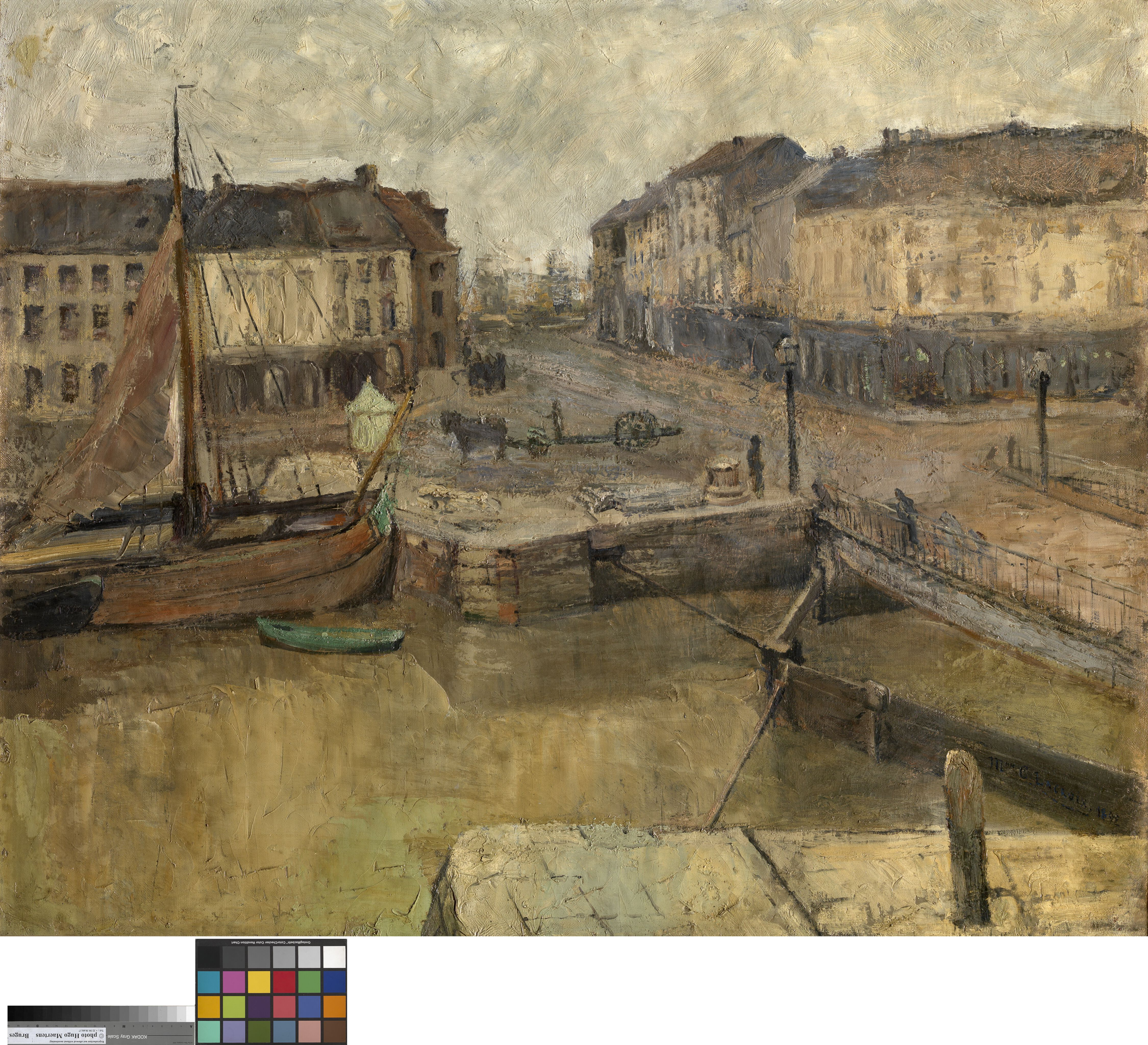
Kattendijkdok in Antwerpen (Clémence Michel, collection: KMSKA, photographer: Hugo Maertens)

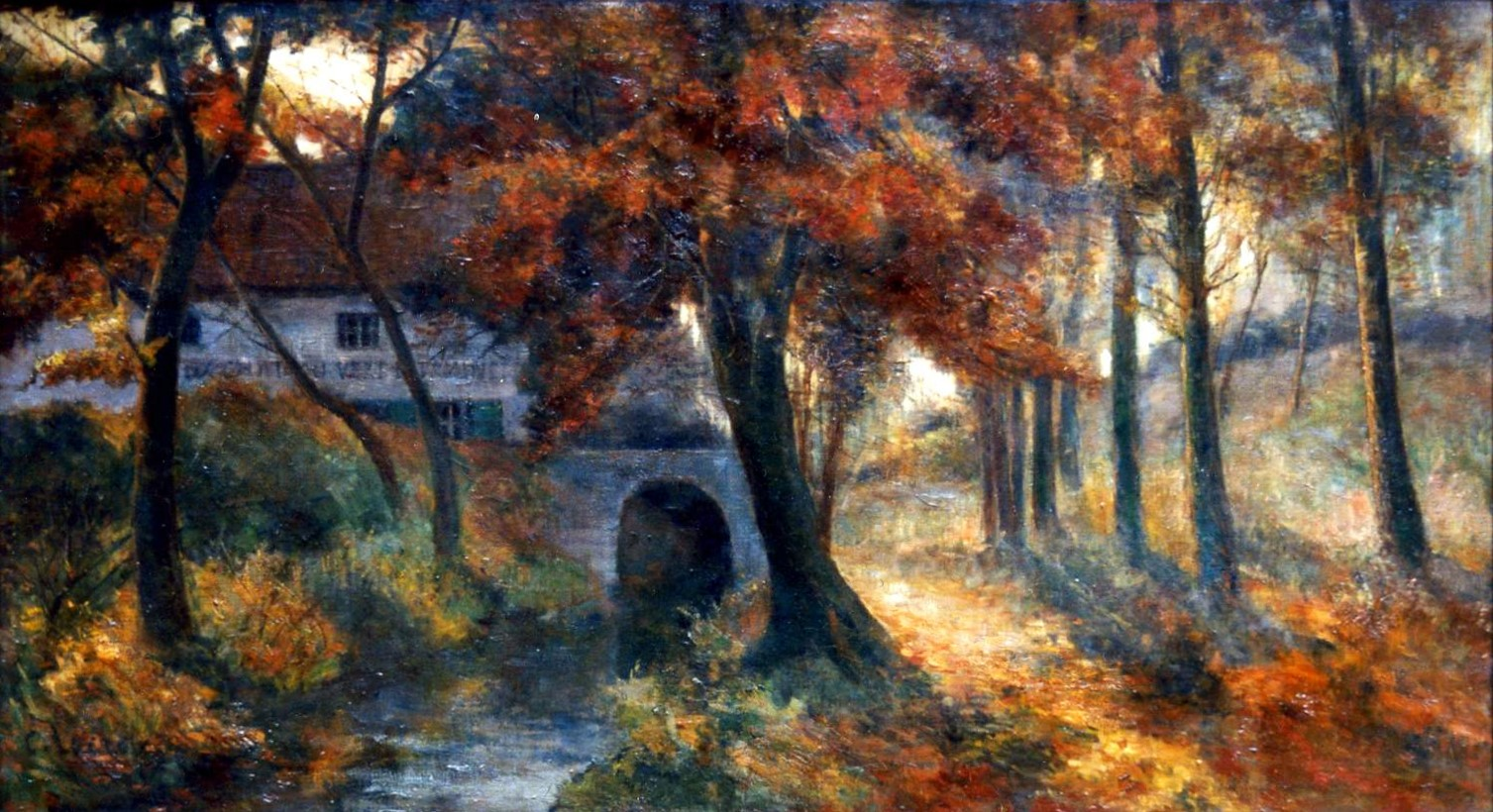
Ancien château vert (Clémence Michel, collection: Municipality of Schaerbeek)

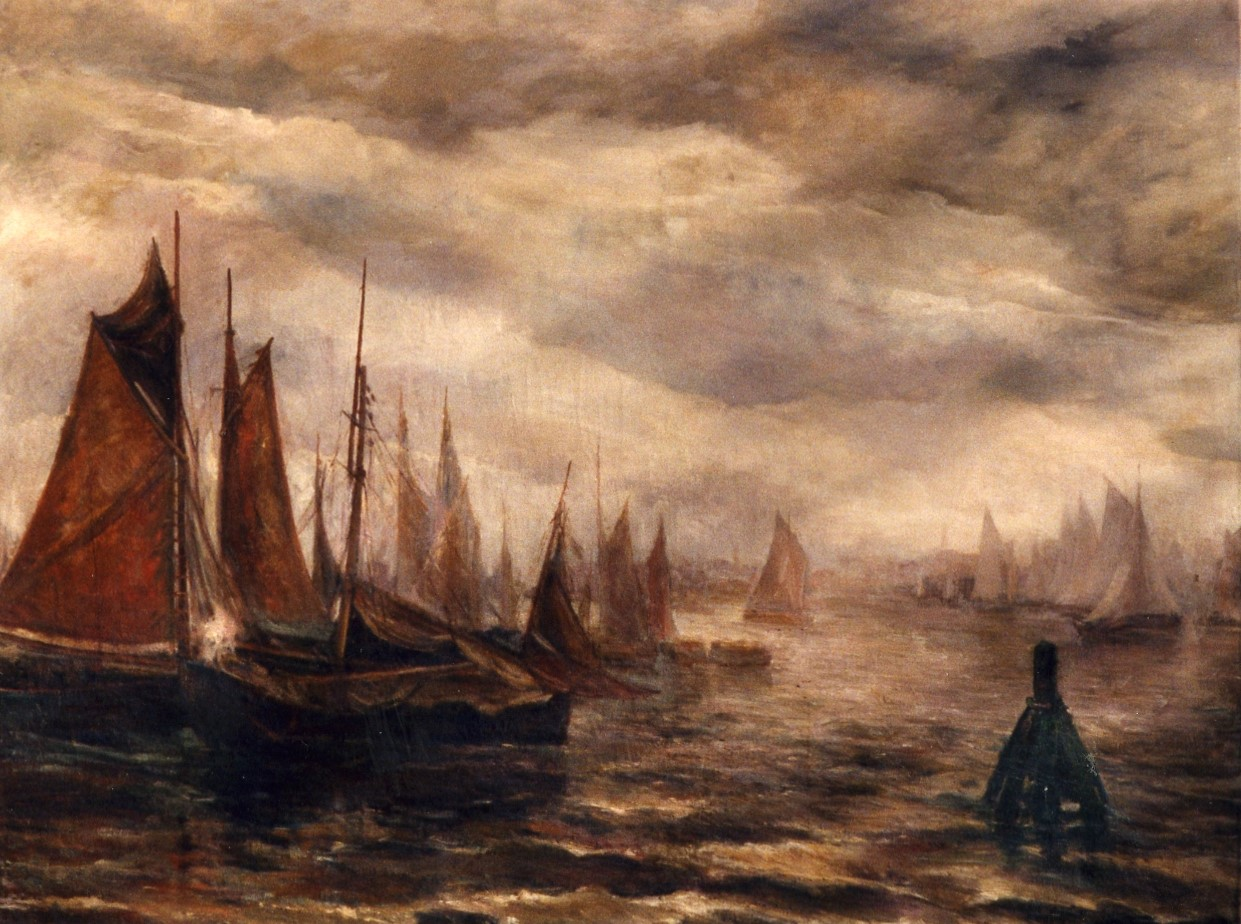
Bassin de Kattendijck à Anvers (Clémence Michel, collection: Municipality of Schaerbeek)

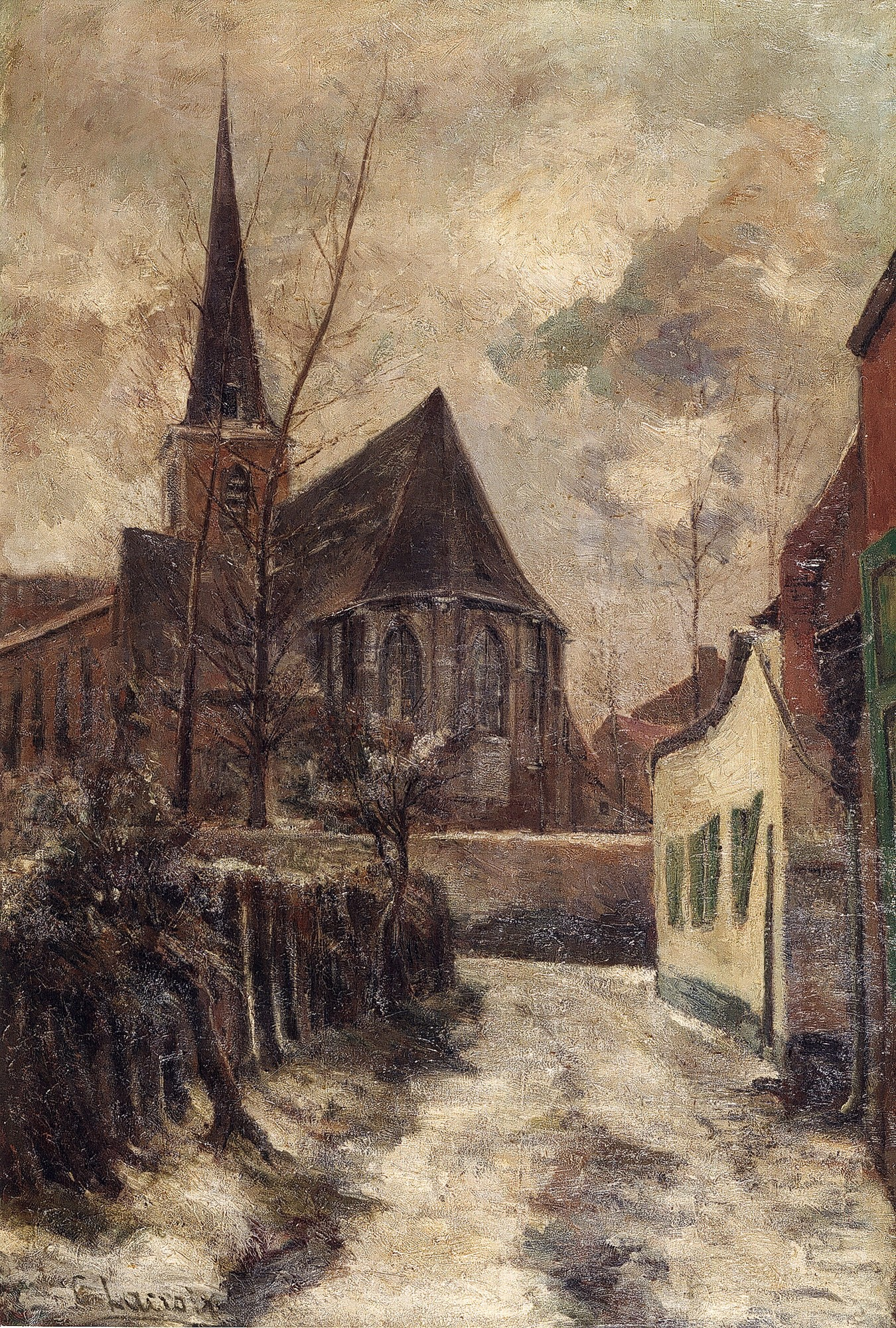
Ancienne église Saint-Servais (Clémence Michel, 1905, collection: Municipality of Schaerbeek)

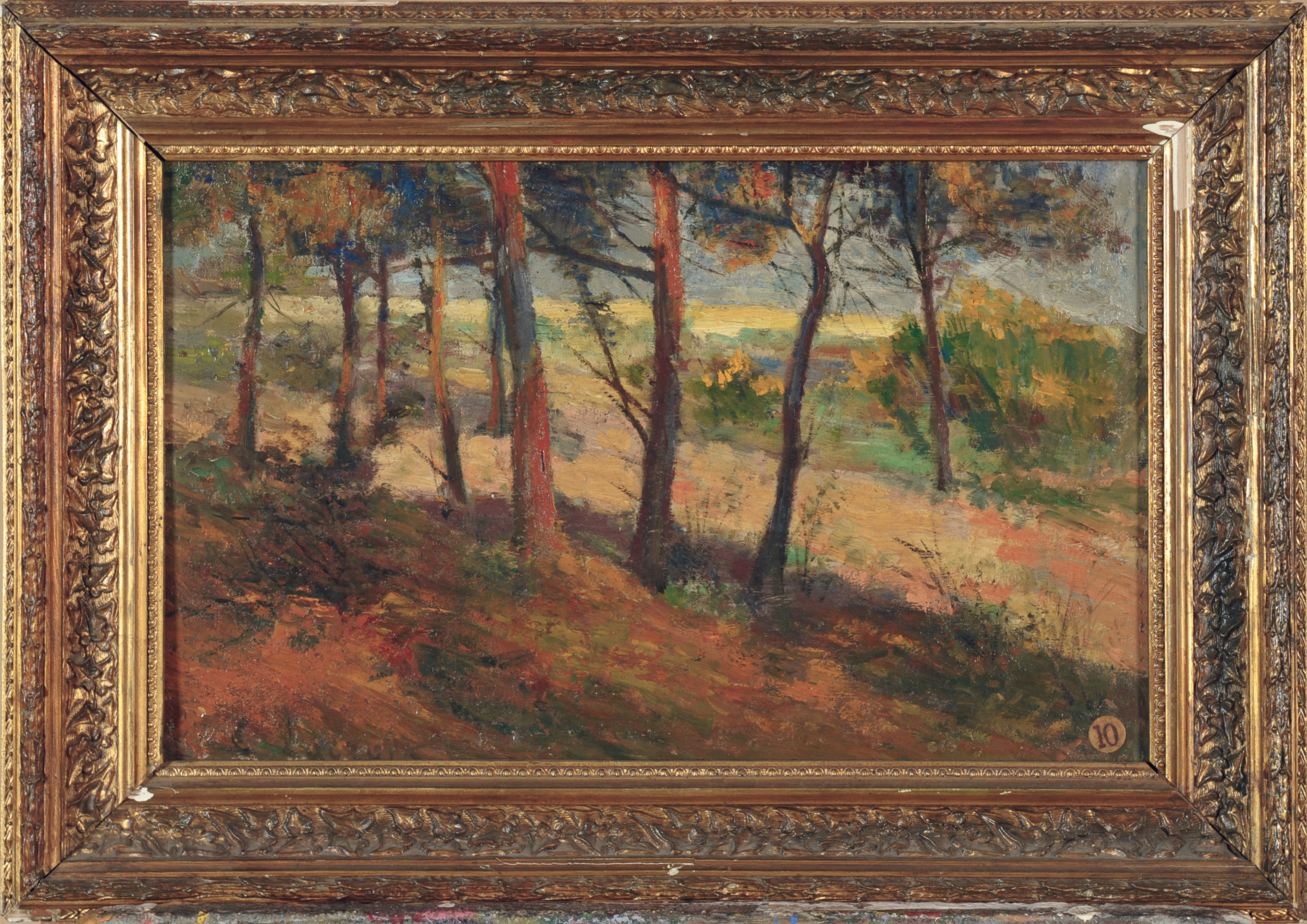
Bois de sapins (Clémence Michel, collection: MoMuse)

The paintings La Traite, Femme mangeant dans la salon à manger du Musée Speekaert (1916) and Homme lisant dans le salon du Musée Speekaert (1916) are owned by the Brussels municipality of Saint-Gilles. Bassin de Kattendijck à Anvers, Ancienne église Saint-Servais (1905) and Ancien château vert are owned by the Brussels municipality of Schaerbeek. They came into the possession of the municipality of Schaerbeek because Clémence Michel sold them after the First World War due to a dire need of money. The painting Ancien château vert was purchased for both its aesthetic and documentary value: the painting depicts a disappeared corner of Schaerbeek. The municipality of Molenbeek-Saint-Jean also owns a painting by Clémence Michel: Bois de sapins. It is located in the MoMuse museum. The seven works of the municipality of Saint-Gilles and the municipality of Schaerbeek are included in the Inventory of the Movable Heritage of the Brussels-Capital Region.

Kattendijkdok in Antwerpen is in the collection of the Royal Museum of Fine Arts Antwerp. Another work, Havenzicht, is part of the collection of the Stedelijk Museum Wuyts-Van Campen and Baron Caroly, which was merged into the City Museum Lier in 2014. En La Route, is in the Museum of Ixelles.
