= Maggy Baum =

Belgian designer and knitwear/textiles specialist (born 1931)

Maggy Baum (born 22 August 1931) was a Belgian designer, knitwear and textile specialist, whose knitwear collection was sold internationally in the 70s and 80s, leading her to be recognized as a pioneer in Belgian fashion. She also taught at La Cambre, the fashion school in Brussels, and published a textiles encyclopedia.

== Biography and career ==
Baum was born on 22 August 1931 in Verviers, a municipality located in the Belgian province of Liège known for its historic textile industry until the first half of the 20th century. Baum is retired and lives in Brussels.

=== Design and consulting ===
Baum started her career at the end of the 1950s, when she bought a knitwear production atelier in Brussels. At the time, the Belgian fashion industry consisted of small, family-owned businesses specialized in practical garments. For a woman to launch her own brand and atelier was an exception. Her technical know-how landed her various consulting positions. She worked with international fashion brands, such as Woolmark and designing for smaller confectionary labels such as Edel, Tat's, Faber en Mantex.

Baum also produced a small line of knitwear ensembles. By 1978, her "casual jersey fashion" was sold in Amsterdam, Paris, Berlin, New York and Japan. On being a woman in fashion, Maggy said: “What is important is that no one imposes a style on women anymore, they’re free to choose what they wear and how they wear it.”

Baum has been credited with inventing “demnit”, a procedure that makes it possible to knit with denim-threads.

=== Teaching and writing ===
At a later stage in her career, Baum became a teacher at Brussels fashion school La Cambre, where she taught Paris-based designer Olivier Theyskens and current head of the fashion school Tony Delcampe, among many others.

In 2008, Baum co-wrote Passepoil, Piqûres et Paillettes together with colour- and fibre specialist Chantal Boyeldieu-Duyck. The publication is an encyclopedic dictionary defining over 8.000 terms from the textile industry. It took seven years to write.
