= Marie De Keyser =

Belgian painter

Marie Isabelle (Telghuys) De Keyser
- Born: Marie Isabelle (Telghuys) De Keyser ca. 1815; Verviers, Belgium
- Died: ca. 1879; Antwerp, Belgium
- Occupation: Painter

Marie Isabelle (Telghuys) De Keyser (1815–1879) was a Belgian artist known for her painting of genre scenes and History painting. She was born in Verviers and died in Antwerp. De Keyser was taught by Nicaise De Keyser, also an artist, and married him in 1840.
