= Marleen Daniels =

Belgian photographer

Marleen Daniels (born October 4, 1958) is a Belgian photographer, who covers human interest stories about war, poverty, refugee crises, child labour and has provided work to the Gamma agency. Her professionals works have been published in such magazines as Paris Match, Newsweek, Time, El País, Max, National Geographic, New York Times, and Standard Magazine. Also she has done commissioned work for Coca-Cola, KPN, Dow, Raggs&Dept and Philips, Elle, Elegance, Glamour, DSM, Red, Vrij Nederland and La Vie En Rose.

== Biography ==
Daniels was born in Heusden-Zolder, Limburg on October 4, 1958. She received her educated in St Lucas, Hasselt and Technicum, Antwerp. In the 80th she started working as s freelance photographer, and became fully independent in 1984. Until 1989 she was working mainly for the newspaper Het Belang van Limburg.

In 1989 a year of political turmoil, she covered Lebanon, Beyrouth with journalist Marc Hoogsteyns during the last days of Michel Aoun. With the late journalist Hans Klok she traveled through South America, covering the fate of the Amazon rainforest and the elections in Chile. Later that year they covered the revolution in Romania and the fall of Nicolae Ceauşescu for Het Belang van Limburg From that period on she was attached to the French agency Gamma, regularly providing pictures from hot spots around the world. During the nineties she covered the orphans of Romania, Chernobyl 10 years later, spring in Albania, the first Iraq War, and the Jordanian and Kurdish refugee crisis.

In the summer of 1992 the war in former Yugoslavia broke out and soon after the war in Bosnia, Sarajevo became her home base for the next two years. Her war work was published in International magazines Stern, Paris Match, Time, Newsweek, New York Times Magazine, El Mundo and Belgian magazines De Standaard Magazine, De Morgen, Panorama.

Together with the Belgian writer Rudi Rotthier whom she met in Belgrade, Serbia in 1993, she photographed child labour in India, resulting in the book 'Children of the Crocodile'. Simultaneously with the upcoming Belgian fashion designers, she began a career as fashion photographer. She traveled to Milan and Paris, first _in 1989_ as commissioned photographer for '"Het Belang Van Limburg", later for the entire Belgian Press and for Designers such as Dries van Noten, Ann Demeulemeester, Dirk Bikkembergs, Raf Simons, Veronique Branquinho.

=== The Dutch Elle ===
In 1990 Daniels joined the Dutch photo agency Hollandse Hoogte and started photographing for the Dutch Elle. The co-production with fashion editor Cara Schiffelers of the Japanese fashion icon Yohji Yamamoto was the start of a successful working relationship. Her portraits and fashion reports were published in Dutch Elle, Elegance, Glamour, La vie en Rose, Vrij Nederland, De Volkskrant magazine, Hollands Diep. The Dutch National Geographic commissioned Daniels to photograph Antwerp and the diamond trade. Since 2010 she regularly photographs travel stories for the Holland Herald, the KLM inflight magazine and for DSM, the weekend supplement of De Standaard, Belgium's main Flemish newspaper. For the book Werken met woorden, 30 interviews with famous fashion designers by the Belgian fashion journalist Veerle Windels, published in 2009, Daniels provided the pictures.

== Awards ==
In 1992 she was rewarded the Belgian Fuji Press Photo Award. In 2010, Daniels was honored with the Eikenloof Award of Heusden-Zolder, the village she originates from. She is the first woman to receive this three yearly cultural reward for her career as photographer.

== Private life ==
She is married to the Welsh photographer Andrew Thomas and lives in Antwerp, Belgium.
