= Anneke Eussen =

Dutch artist (born 1978)

- Born: 1978 (age 47–48); Kerkrade (NL)
- Known for: Drawing, sculpture, photography, installation art
- Awards: Winner Young Artists On The Road Award (2003)
- Website: www.anneke-eussen.com

Anneke Eussen (born 1978) is a contemporary artist in fields of drawing, sculpture and photography and installation. Eussen was born in Netherlands 1978 and currently lives and works in Berlin.

Eussen won Young Artists On The Road Award in 2003 and was nominated with Parkstad Limburg Prijs 2004.

== Solo exhibitions ==
2017

- Vertical Horizon, Tatjana Pieters, Ghent (BE)

2015

- New Art Section, Art Rotterdam, with Galerie Tatjana Pieters, Rotterdam (NL)

2014

- Circle lines, Cruise & Callas, Berlin (DE)
- Solo, selected by Katerina Gregos, Art Brussels, with Galerie Tatjana Pieters, Brussels (BE)
- As It Is, Galerie Tatjana Pieters, Ghent (BE)

2013

- Presentation of new work & artist book, Zebrastraat, Ghent (BE)
- NEUBAU Stuck, LSD Galerie, Berlin (DE)
- Verbannter Fehlgeschmack, LSD Galerie, Berlin (DE)

2012

- Close to what's real, Highlight Gallery, San Francisco (USA) Palast, palästchen, ..., Galerie Tatjana Pieters, Ghent (BE)

2011

- the loser project invited by Rui Duarte, showroom, Berlin (DE)

2010

- Joyride, Galerie Petra Vankova, Berlin (DE)

2009

- Double De Luxe, Galerie Tatjana Pieters, Gent (BE)

2007

- Bildmuseet Umeå (SE)
- Indefinite Reflections, De Bond, Brugge (BE)
- Rise and shin,e Onetwenty, Gent (BE)

2006

- Lucky me!, Onetwenty Gallery, Gent (BE)

2003

- Threats/treats, Suermondt Ludwig Museum, Achen (DE)

== Collections ==
- Collection Dutch ministry of internal affairs (Tokyo dreaming 02 & Porcelain boy), 2008.
- Collection Dutch ministry of internal affairs (Blue boy 2006, colour pencil drawing 100x100 cm), 2007.

== Grants and prizes ==
- 2004 Nomination Parkstad Limburg Prize
- 2003 Winner Young Artists on the Road Award
