= Magda Francot =

Belgian painter

Magda Francot (born in Antwerp on 30 July 1942) is a Belgian painter who moved from an early Modernist period to a later commitment to the aims and techniques of Classical painting. She produces works in a realist style marked by strong foregrounding (in this, similar to the Pre-Raphaelites), an illustrative manner showing a determined orientation toward draughtsmanship and high-contrast lines, and in content is of Symbolist sympathies.

She is married to the architect Hug Francot, and as of 2006 was working in Antwerp and living in the Belgian town of Leuven. She runs a school for artists wishing to learn Classical techniques.
