= Marthe Guillain =

Belgian artist

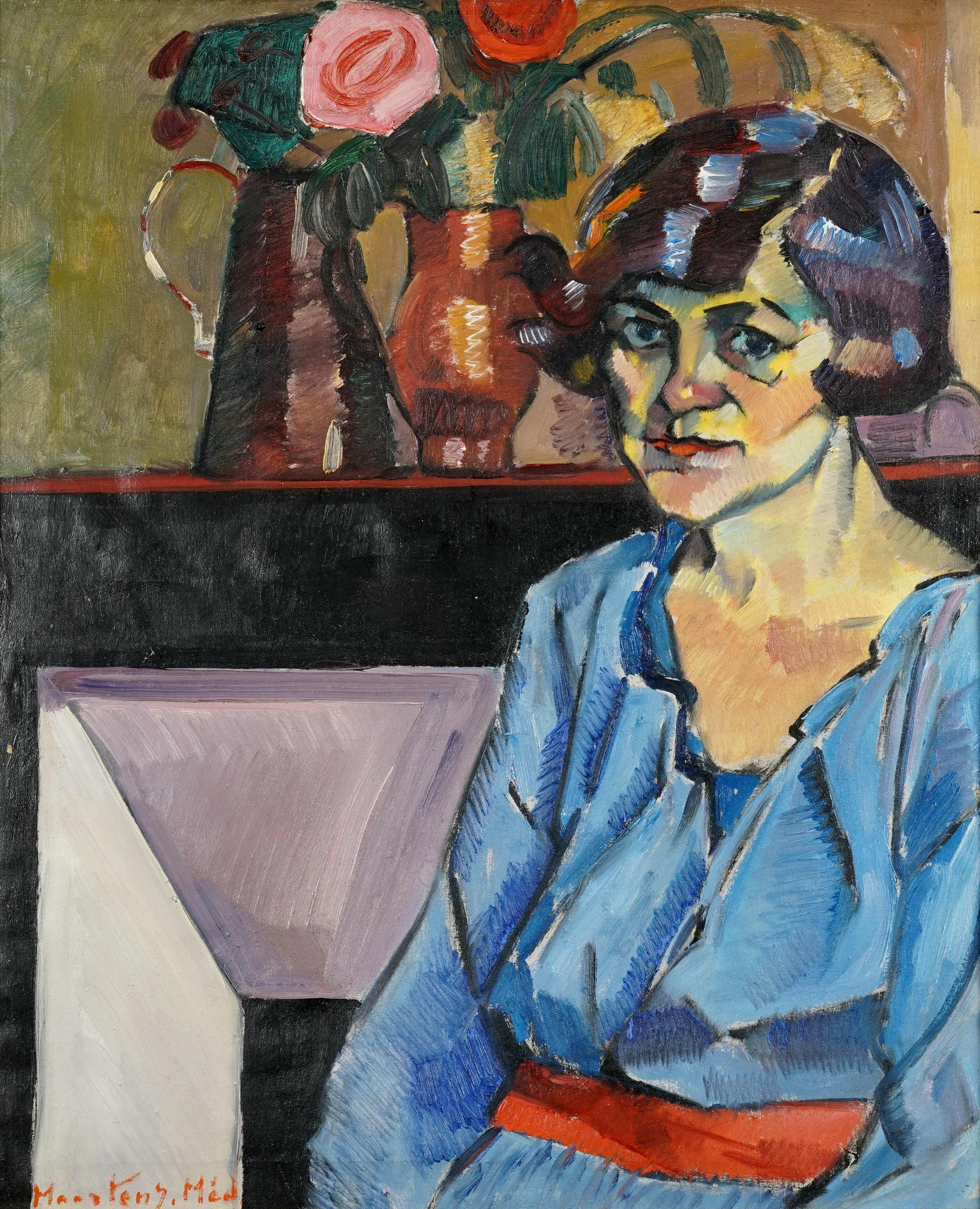
- Portrait of Marthe Guillain by Médard Maertens
- Born: 1890; Charleroi, Belgium
- Died: 1974 (aged 83–84)
- Known for: Painting
- Spouse: Médard Maertens

Marthe Guillain (1890-1974) was a Belgian painter.

== Biography ==
Guillain was born in 1890 in Charleroi, Belgium. She was a student of Henry Leonardus van den Houten. She was married to the painter Médard Maertens. She traveled to Istanbul, Paris, and the Belgian Congo. She was a member of the Salon d'Automne.

Guillain died in 1974 in Watermael-Boitsfort, Belgium. Her work in the collection of the Royal Museums of Fine Arts of Belgium.
