= Valentine Avoh =

Belgian fashion designer of Ivorian descent

- Born: February 16, 1983 (age 43); Brussels
- Education: London College of Fashion
- Occupation: Wedding Dress Designer
- Children: 1
- Website: http://valentineavoh.com

Valentine Avoh is a Belgian fashion designer of Ivorian descent. She is a wedding dress designer, writer, journalist and photographer. She started her own label in 2015 after working for fashion designers Alexander McQueen, Samantha Shaw, Alexis Mabille, Sam Andrès Milano, Spanish wedding dress label Pronovias and designer Marc Philippe Coudeyre. Following the social movement Black Lives Matter in the United States, Valentine Avoh has been published in The Coveteur and The New York Times as a young and talented European Black female bridal designer and on Brides (magazine) as one of the "20 Black Wedding Dress Designers to Know" in 2021.

== Career ==
She had her first working experience at Alexander McQueen as an intern at the design studio for two seasons until her final collaboration for the collection Spring-Summer 2010, which was the last collection done by McQueen during his life. At Alexander MQueen, Avoh discovered the importance of taking time: “I learned the importance of time, to design beautiful things you need to slow down”. This six months internship was decisive in her career: “Working at McQueen was really life-changing for me, as I was fascinated by his creative process and the patience put into each of his pieces, but more importantly, how he worked each fabric and transformed it to make it its own. As having my own business was something I’ve always wanted since childhood, the idea kept flourishing in my head until 2015, when I finally decided to launch the brand and opened my atelier in Brussels.” (The Coveteur, 2020)

In 2007, Valentine Avoh worked as a junior fashion designer for London-based wedding dress designer Samantha Shaw. Then, moving to Paris, she worked for the Haute-Couture designer Alexis Mabille in 2009. The same year Valentine started designing her first wedding dress for a friend using ostrich feathers and developed more and more interest in this field. For a few years, she kept on working for design labels while designing and sewing wedding dresses for private clients.

Following her Italian partner, she moved to Milan and worked for fashion label San Andrès. She was also shooting street style photographs for her online blog. She then developed three wedding dresses to advertise her craft and debut her own label. Back to Brussels, she worked as a seamstress for alterations for the Spanish wedding dress label Pronovias, she designed and signed her first commercial model called “Jackie” for the Brussels-based wedding dress boutique Love Sweet Etc. The design “Jackie” became very successful and confirmed her wish to evolve as a bridal designer.

In 2014, she made two dresses for Queen Mathilde of Belgium under the name of fashion designer Marc Philippe Coudeyre, she was at the time his head of atelier and developed the patterns and sewn the dresses after fitting sessions with the Queen Mathilde of Belgium. Queen Mathilde of Belgium wore her dress during the 2014 edition of the celebration of the Fête Nationale Belge during the National ball. The Queen has worn this dress several times thereafter. In 2015, Valentine Avoh founded her eponym label in Brussels and then opened her own space in 2017 called “the Atelier Valentine Avoh”.

== Atelier Valentine Avoh ==
Valentine Avoh's inspirations are often extracted from movies from the 30s to 50s when women were ultra-feminine. She is inspired by actresses like Jean Harlow, Marlene Dietrich and Dorothy Dandridge. She describes her style as minimal playing with see-through fabrics such as silk, lace, tulle and materials like feathers and delicate embroideries. “I think of my dresses as red carpet pieces, designed to make a strong impression, but more importantly, they are for all the women who wish to highlight their femininity without compromising ease.” (The New York Times)

In an article of the Coveteur by Sana F. Khan, Avoh expresses the sources of her ideas: “The Atelier Valentine Avoh came as a desire to revive my love for haute couture in Belgium, and design refined fluid, and delicately detailed wedding dresses. My label is inspired by the golden age of cinéma, jazz, and iconic women, yet my designs are for all those who wish to highlight their femininity without compromising ease. I want to create showstopping pieces which could easily be worn for a wedding or on the red carpet.”
