= Françoise Taylor =

Belgian artist

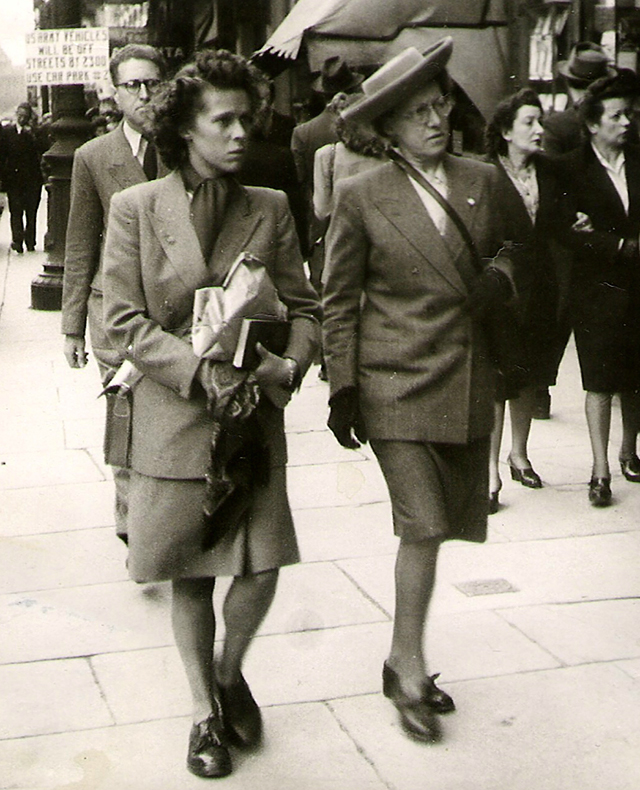
- Françoise Taylor (then Françoise Wauters, left of photo) with her mother in Brussels, 1945
- Born: 1 January 1920; Liège
- Died: 24 January 2007 (aged 87); Bolton
- Known for: Illustrating, Drawing, Painting
- Website: francoisetaylor.com

Françoise Taylor (née Wauters) was a Belgian/British artist (1 January 1920 – 24 January 2007).

== Life ==
Françoise Taylor (née Wauters) was born in Bressoux, Liège, on 1 January 1920. Her father, Charles Wauters, was Professor Emeritus at the University of Liège. During the 1930s after the Wauters family had moved to Brussels he was appointed Bulgarian Consul (representative) in Belgium. In 1937 at the age of seventeen Françoise (then Wauters) began her studies in art at the Académie Royale in Brussels and continued as a postgraduate at the l'École nationale supérieure d'Architecture et des Arts décoratifs de La Cambre. where her tutor was the Belgian engraver Joris Minne.

She moved to England in 1946 having married an Englishman, Kenneth Taylor, in Brussels that year, first to Oxford where she studied Lithography at the Ruskin School of Art then Bolton where she spent the rest of her life. From 1969 to 1982 she was Head of Art at Mount St Joseph girls' school in Bolton. She had five children. She died from pneumonia at her home in Bolton on January 24, 2007 aged 87.

== Artistic work ==
While still a teenager at the Académie Royale des Beaux-Arts Françoise Taylor (then Wauters) won First Prize for Drawing three years in succession. She left the Académie in 1941 with only the fourth prize in that year due to her increasing tendency to elongate and distort the figures in her drawings (a characteristic she retained throughout her artistic life). She had received an excellent grounding in drawing but felt there was "nothing at the Académie Royale to stimulate the imagination".

During her six years at La Cambre she specialised in engraving, book illustration and typography, for which she was awarded a Diploma with the Highest Distinction and a Mastery in Book Illustration - the first in Belgium - "avec la plus grande distinction et les félicitations du Jury".

The authors whose stories she has illustrated include Sir Thomas Malory, Lewis Carroll, William Shakespeare, Charles Baudelaire, Fyodor Dostoevsky, Samuel Taylor Coleridge, Emily Brontë, Aesop, Homer, Hans Christian Andersen, Jack London, Jean Giono, Panait Istrati, the Catholic Bible, Alain-Fournier, Graham Greene, Miguel de Cervantes, Franz Kafka, Nils Holgersson, Max Jacob, August Vermeylen, Joseph Conrad, Selma Lagerlöf, Jonathan Swift, Filip De Pillecyn and Ernest Claes. During her time in Oxford she also illustrated the book 'Oxfordshire' by Reginald Turnor.

Amongst the tales she illustrated in detail are Alice in Wonderland (Lewis Carroll), The Rime of the Ancient Mariner (Samuel Taylor Coleridge) and Morte d'Arthur (Thomas Malory).

Her experience of living throughout the German Occupation was reflected in her series of engravings 'Pointes Seches sur la Guerre'. These engravings depict the deprivations of life in Belgium during the war years, as well as the Deportations and the Allied Bombardment. Together with a number of her works, they are now in the permanent collection of the Whitworth Art Gallery, Manchester.

Moving to Bolton in the industrial North West of England her inspiration came not only from a life-long interest in fables and nursery rhymes but an environment she drew and painted with the fascinated unfamiliarity of an 'outsider': mills, railways, gasworks, coal mines, park bandstands, football scenes from Burnden Park (then the home of Bolton Wanderers) together with the people and their animals.

Françoise Taylor continued to work as an artist into the 1990s. She held exhibitions in Brussels, Liège, Manchester, Salford and Bolton and her works have been exhibited in London, Paris and other cities. A number of her engravings and etchings are in the Royal Library of Belgium in Brussels and several in the Cabinet des Estampes in Paris.
