= Cindy Frey =

Belgian photographer

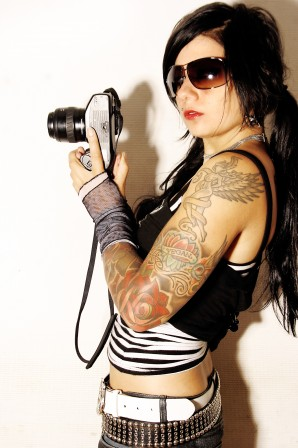
Cindy Frey

Cindy Frey, is a freelance professional photographer, who specializes in music, live photography, portraits, life style, advertisement, fashion and dark art/photomanipulations. She was born on 5 September 1975 in Neerpelt, Belgium.

== Photography ==
Frey picked up her first camera in May 2003 after doing vegan catering for punk, hardcore and metal bands. She wanted to document these moments to have them as good memories later. She became self-employed as a full-time photographer in 2007 and travels the world to take photos of bands, models, tattoos and documentary photos. She worked with many international bands such as Lacuna Coil, Alkaline Trio, Sick of It All, As I Lay Dying, Cradle of Filth, Stone Sour, Marilyn Manson, Life of Agony, Slipknot, the Haunted, In This Moment, Suicide Silence, Parkway Drive, Comeback Kid, Helloween, Flogging Molly, Street Dogs, Soulfly, Bleeding Through, The Dresden Dolls, City and Colour, Alexisonfire, Napalm Death, Walls of Jericho, H_{2}O, and many more. Frey is self-taught; she learned everything through books, internet and experimenting. Frey has done several projects and has released four calendars, posters and postcards and she has published four photobooks. She has had seven solo-exhibitions, six in Belgium and one in the Netherlands and also a group exhibition in Hamburg.

== Exhibitions ==
- Girl at the rockshow expo in Antwerp in Oct–Nov 2006
- Live evil expo in Antwerp Oct 2007
- Ink passion expo in Ostend in July 2009
- Self made expo in Brussels in March/April 2010
- Come and play with us expo in Oostend in Oct/Nov 2010
- She's got it expo in Kortrijk in Jan/Febr 2011
- Cindy Frey expo in Uden in Jan/Febr 2011

== Photobooks ==
- Girl at the rockshow Photobook: hardcover, 200 bands, 128 pages, concert photography, published by Obsessive productions, April 2005
- Live evil photobook: softcover, 40 pages, full colour, dark art and photo-manipulations, self-published, October 2008
- Ink passion photobook: softcover, Full colour, tattoo portraits, self-published, July 2009
- Come and play with us photo book: hardcover, full colour, 100 pages, creepy kids portraits, self-published, October 2010
