= Ann Salens =

Belgian fashion designer

- Born: 12 February 1940; Ostend
- Died: 7 September 1994 (aged 54); Antwerp

Ann Salens (12 February 1940 – 7 September 1994) was a Belgian fashion designer. She is considered to be the first Belgian international fashion designer. She pioneered the use of light, music, and art during her fashion shows. Her biggest success is the "fringed dress", a simple knitted dress in which long loops are crocheted. Salens was popular in hippie culture. In Belgium, the general public got to know Salens' clothing through Ann Christy, in France through Juliette Gréco.

== Life and work ==
Salens was born on 12 February 1940 in Ostend as the youngest of six children. The family moved from Ostend to Neerpelt shortly after the Second World War, and in 1958 she moved to Antwerp. She met Fluxus artist Ludo Mich and was married to him between 1965 and 1972. The couple had chronic money problems. To make ends meet, they made paintings that they sold to friends and family, witches from fabric, fabric cloths, and greeting cards. Salens bought second-hand clothing that she disassembled and made new creations to sell them for a profit.

After working for a while in the Twenty Boutique in Antwerp, she opened her own boutique in the Wijngaardstraat, which soon became the "place to be" for those looking for trendy clothes. The first dresses that Salens made were simple stitched creations in curtain fabric, mainly because she had not followed fashion training. The crocheted of her mother inspired her to make crocheted creations herself. Crocheted dresses, jackets and trouser suits in daring shades of color became Salens' trademark. Her happenings at unusual locations earned her the title of "Belgian Fashion's Bird of Paradise".

She took over the design shop "De Cirkel" in the Wolstraat in Antwerp, where her shop windows quickly became controversial and her collection became successful. The production remained artisanal: Salens almost hired her entire family in Neerpelt. After her international breakthrough – she worked in Paris together with Denise Bourillon as production could no longer keep up with demand. Salens changed from crocheted to (machine) knitting, with crocheted accents. In 1974 she made the costumes for the Belgian movie "Where the birds cough" from Frans Buyens. In the late seventies, her business started to decline.

Salens was part of the Miss Belgium jury in 1977 and the candidates wore her creations during the closing ceremony. Her clothing was successful, but she refused to cash it in commercially. Although connoisseurs agreed that Salens' designs were timeless, her style did not catch on with the 1980s fashion. She went bankrupt in 1987, the same year she was diagnosed with cancer.

In 1992 she started a new collaboration with Geert Bruloot, the man behind the Antwerp Six. She died from cancer on 7 September 1994.

== Bibliography ==
- Adriaens, Manu (1995). Ik wil niet aan deze wereld wennen: over Ann Salens, modeontwerpster (1940–1994). Berchem: EPO. ISBN 90-6445-936-3.
