= Cécile Miguel =

Belgian artist and writer

Cécile Miguel (19 March 1921 - 2001) was a Belgian artist and writer.

She was born in Gilly. Miguel received the Prix de la Jeune Peinture Française in 1950 and took part in an exhibition in Lucerne where works by Picasso and Joan Miró also appeared. In 1945, she married André Miguel. She began writing in collaboration with her husband in 1976.

== Selected works ==
- L’oeil dans la bouche, poetry (1978) with André Miguel
- Alphabet des astres, poetry (1979), with André Miguel
- Je ne sais pas ce qui, play with André Miguel
- Ça fait comme des paroles, play with André Miguel
- Sonnez et entrez, poetry (1981), with André Miguel
- Le ver de l’enfer, novel (1982), with André Miguel
- Dans l’autre scène, poetry (1984), with André Miguel
- Orée, poetry (1989), with André Miguel
- Au creu des apparences, poetry (1989)
- Facies-escargot franchissant les monts du Sommeil (1990)
- Au royaume d’ombre (1990)
