= Gérard Cauvin =

Gérard Calvin (died 26 May 1531) was the father of the Protestant Reformer John Calvin.

Calvin lived in Noyon, France, located in the province of Picardy. A man of hard and severe character, he occupied a prominent position as apostolic secretary to Charles de Hangest, bishop of Noyon. He also served as proctor in the Chapter of the diocese and as fiscal procurator of the county. He lived on intimate terms with the best families of the neighborhood.

His wife Jeanne Lefranc, the daughter of an innkeeper at Cambrai, was noted for her beauty and piety. She died after giving birth to six children, four sons (Charles, John, Anthony, a fourth son who died during childhood) and then two daughters, one of whom was named Mary. After Lefranc's death, he married a woman with whom he would have two more daughters.

Cauvin became involved in financial embarrassment and was excommunicated, perhaps on suspicion of heresy. He died on 26 (or 25) May 1531, after a long sickness. He would have been buried in unconsecrated soil but for the intercession of his oldest son, Charles, who gave security for the discharge of his father's obligations.
