= Renaat Braem =

Belgian architect

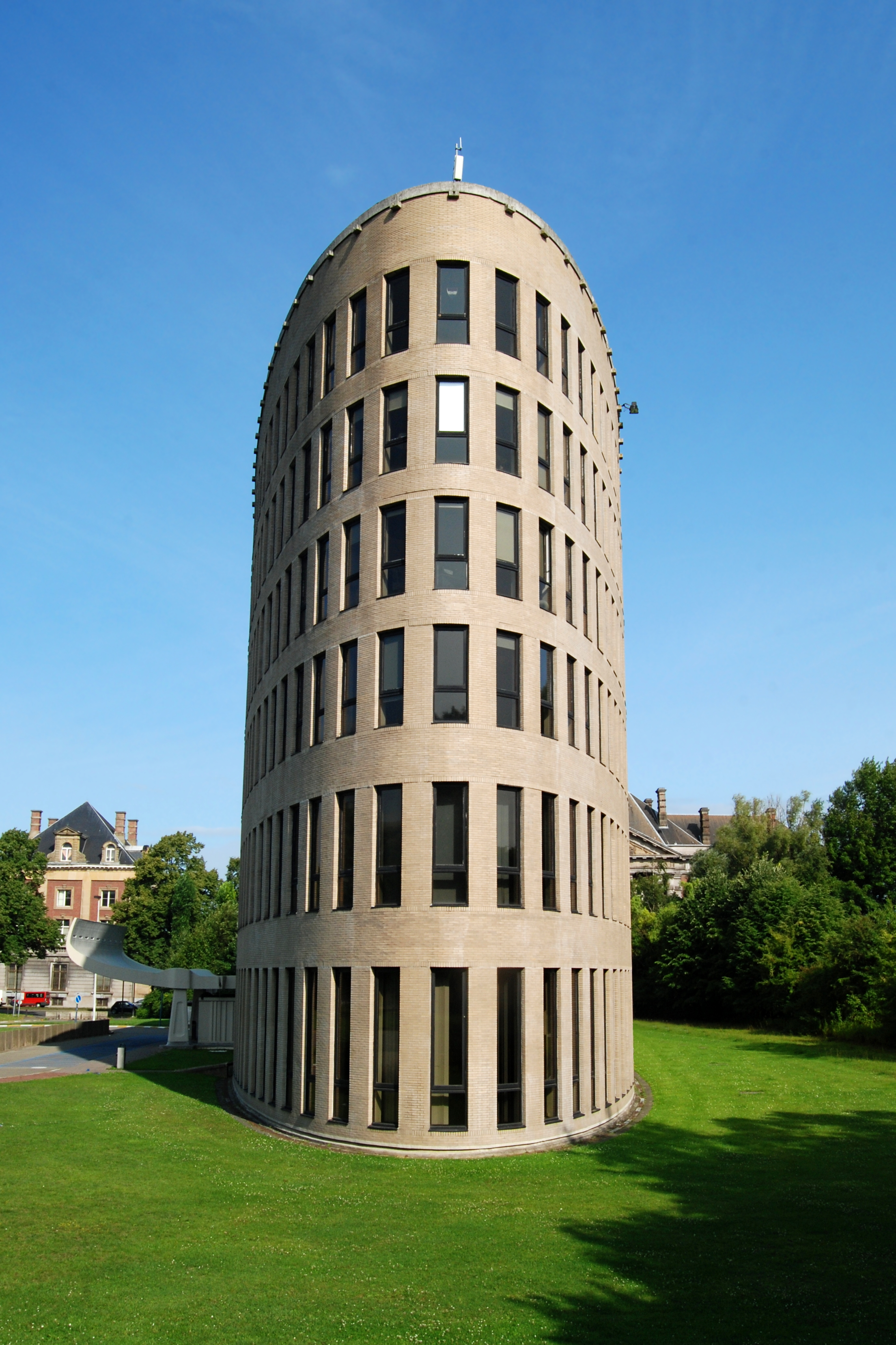
The rectorate of the Vrije Universiteit Brussel

Renaat Braem (29 August 1910 – 31 January 2001) was a leading Belgian architect and urban planner in the latter half of the twentieth century.

== Biography ==
Renaat Braem was born in Antwerp in 1910. He graduated as an architect from the Royal Academy of Fine Arts in Antwerp in 1935, with a constructivism-inspired design for a linear city between Antwerp and Liège. He received the biannual Prix Godecharle the same year.

Braem used the money of the award to study abroad, working at the studio of Le Corbusier in 1936 and 1937. He became a member of the Congrès International d'Architecture Moderne in 1937, and his first architectural realisations in these pre-war years were rooted firmly in the new "modern" style.

He became one of Belgium's most prominent architects in the early 1950s, when he received two commissions from the city council of Antwerp: the development of the Administratif Center in the heart of the city, and a social housing project in Het Kiel, a neighborhood in the suburbs. The Administratif Center was only partly realised ten years later, and the one tower that was actually built in the end became the Police Tower, the headquarters of the Antwerp police force. The social housing project though became a landmark in the history of social housing in Belgium and one of the most important architectural realisations of the 1950s.

Over the next two decades, Braem created many projects, ranging from private buildings to large scale housing complexes in Leuven, Brussels, Deurne and Boom. His work was faithful to the Athens Charter of the CIAM until the late 1960s, when his work became less rigid and more organic.

Braem was also an important figure in the study and debate of modern architecture in Belgium, cofounding important magazines like Plan, Architecture, or Bouwen en Wonen, writing articles, and being interviewed for radio, television and newspapers. He was one of the oginators of the Bouwcentrum in Antwerp, which tried to promote the industrialisation of the work of building through education and prototyping. In 1968, he wrote Het lelijkste land ter wereld ("The most ugly country in the world"), an essay against the postwar spatial planning of Belgium with an ecological warning as well.

Renaat Braem published his memoirs Het schoonste land ter wereld (The most beautiful country in the world) in 1987. He moved to a nursing home in 1997. His private home, built in 1955, and all its contents (archive, library, furniture) was legated to the Flemish Community in 1999. He died in 2001 in Essen. His house was transformed into a museum, the second of its kind in Belgium after the Horta Museum in Brussels.

An exhibition on the life and work of Renaat Braem took place in 2010, to celebrate his centenary.

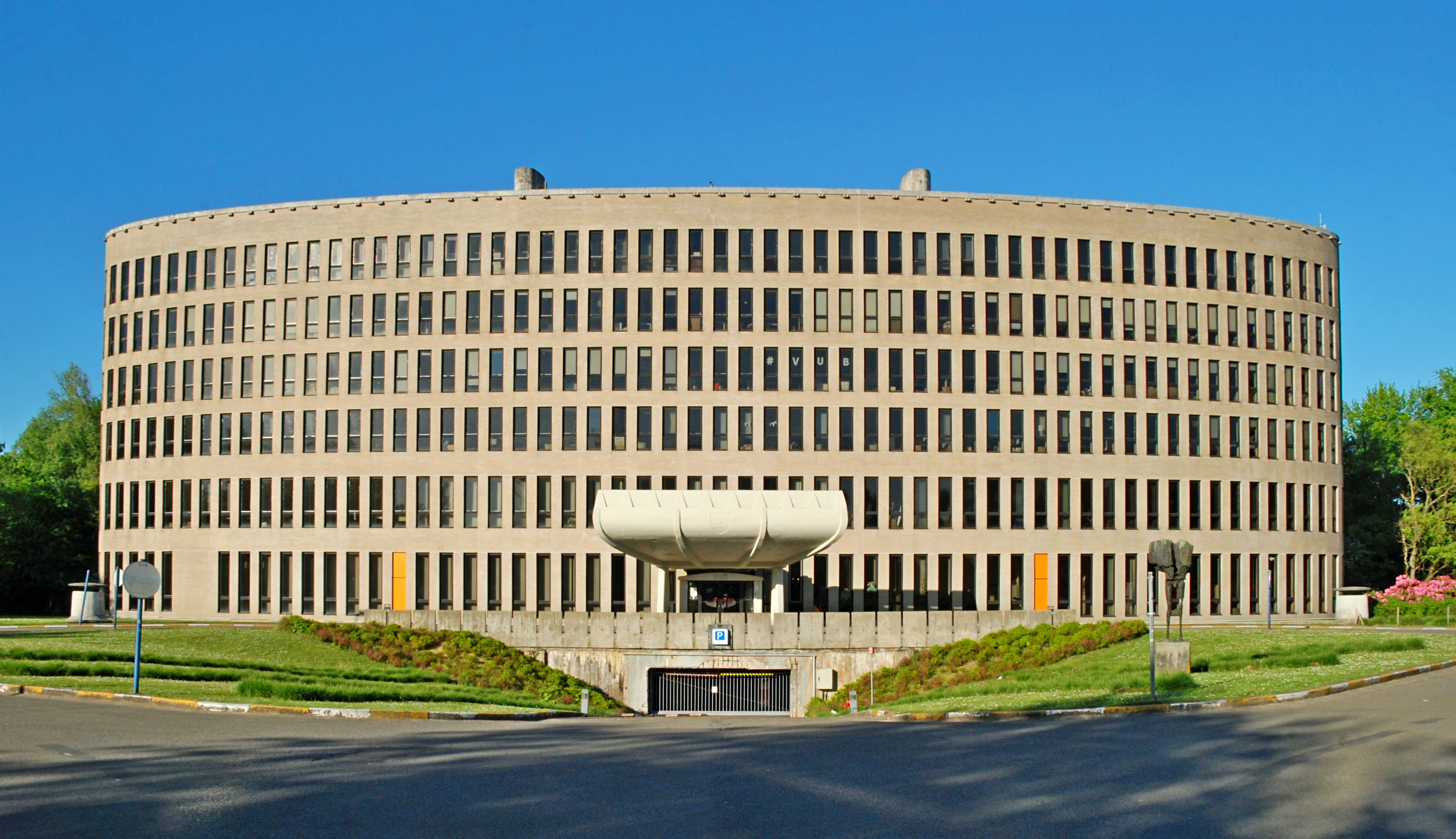
The rectorate of the Vrije Universiteit Brussel

== Major works ==
- House P. Van den Berghe (1935), Dichtersstraat 82, Antwerp
- House Janssens (1936), Van Erstenstraat 73, Antwerp, winner of the Prize Van de Ven
- Two-family house Chantraine-Vantvelt (1936), Frans Stienletlaan 33–35, Antwerp
- Two-family house (1937), Sorbenlaan 57, Antwerp
- "Handel", Art Deco highrise (1944), Van Havrelei 25, Antwerp
- Monument of the Resistance (1945), Weerstandsplein, Diest
- House (1946–1948), Hulstenweg 13, Zoersel
- House (1948), Berkenlaan 43, Kraainem
- House Georges Brewaeys and studio-house Aimé De Martelaere (1948–1950), Schotensesteenweg 301–303, Antwerp
- Youth hostel (1949), Gagelhoflaan 26, Zoersel
- Neighborhood (1951–1958), Kiel, Antwerp (800 housing units)
- House (1952), Polygoonstraat 9, Antwerp
- Administrative center (1952–1967), Oudaan 11, Antwerp
- House Rik de Roover (1954), Luchtvaartstraat 28, Antwerp
- Two-family house (1955), Auwegemvaart 106–107, Mechelen, built for graphical artist Ray Gilles
- Private house of Renaat Braem (1955), Menegemlei 23, Antwerp
- Model city (1955–1957), Heysel, Brussels (1200 houses)
- Neighborhood Kruiskenslei (1957–1977), Boom
- House Nagels (1958), Drabstraat 252, Mortsel
- House van Hellem (1959), Brusselsesteenweg 411, Asse
- Corner house (1960), Vlaamshoofdlaan 20, Antwerp
- Jan-Pieter Minckelerstraat (1960–1970), Leuven
- Sint-Maartenstraat (1960–1968), Leuven
- House Van den Branden (1962–63): Lievevrouwestraat 66, Ranst
- Kindergarten (1963), Sint-Gummarusstraat 2, Antwerp
- House Alsteens (1966–1969), Dobralaan 28, Overijse
- House (1966), Kasteelstraat 76, Overijse
- House Van Humbeeck (1967), Pastorijstraat 3, Buggenhout
- House Van de Pas (1967), Dieseghemlei 110, Mortsel
- Hoogbouwwijk, Sint-Maartensdal (1967), Leuven, prijs "Société Belge des Urbanistes et Architectes Modernistes"
- Glaverbel building (1967), Chaussée de La Hulpe - Terhulpsesteenweg 166, Watermael-Boitsfort
- Library (1968–1976), Sint-Cordulaplein 13, Schoten
- Pavilion for sculpture (Middelheim Open Air Sculpture Museum) (1968–1971), Middelheimlaan, Antwerp
- House (1968–1969), Van Amstelstraat 01 88, Antwerp
- Corner house (1969–1970), Lindelei 219, Hemiksem
- House Schellekens (1970), Loenhoutseweg 34, Hoogstraten
- Rectorate Vrije Universiteit Brussel (1971–1976), Pleinlaan 2, Elsene
- House Van Hoecke (1972–1978), Oudestraat 8, Temse
- House Moyson (1973–1974), Veldenstraat 95, Mechelen
- Windmill (1973–1975), Sint-Annastrand, Antwerp
- Middelheim hospital (1975–1978), Lindendreef 1, Antwerp
- Villa (1977–1978), Kwikstaartlaan 2, Antwerp
- Cinema "Nova", Sint-Bernardsesteenweg 318, Antwerp
- Waasdonk-Langbaanvelden (1974), a post-war park district with 303 housing units, 2100 Deurne
