= Germaine Van Parys =

Germaine Van Parys, also Van Parijs, (1893–1983) was a Belgian photojournalist. She was the first woman in Belgium to join the profession, which was very unusual to find a woman mentioned in the history of photography before 1920s. She left an extensive collection covering the people and places she photographed from 1918 to 1968, documenting key events in the country's history.

== Biography ==
Born in Brussels in 1893, Van Parys joined the profession in 1913. By the end of the First World War, she was recognized as one of Belgium's most competent photographers. In 1926, she was a founding member of the "Association des reporters photographes de presse". She first worked for Le Soir (1922), then for La Meuse (1932), also contributing to the Paris weekly L'Illustration. In addition to images of royalty, she covered national catastrophes, plane crashes and assassinations. Of particular interest are her photographs of the Namur floods in 1926. She was one of the few women photographers to be a correspondent during the Second World War, also covering the Belgian liberation.

In 1956, she created her own agency, Van Parijs Media. Van Parys died in Brussels in 1983. Van Parijs Media was merged with the Reports press agency in 2005.

In October 2011, a retrospective of Van Parys' work was presented by La Fondation Germaine Van Parys.
