= Arpaïs Du Bois =

Belgian drawer and painter

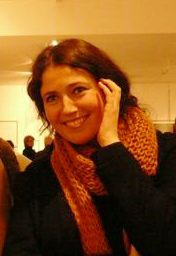
- Arpaïs Du Bois in Galerie Geukens and De Vil, Antwerp, Belgium, on 9 December 2010
- Born: 1973 (age 52–53); Gent, Belgium
- Known for: painting, drawing
- Website: arpais.com

Arpaïs Du Bois (born 1973) is a Belgian drawer and painter. She lives and works in Antwerp, Belgium.

== Work ==
Her works on paper in diary-like books form a significant portion of her artwork. Utilizing word and image associations are characteristic of Du Bois's work, as is the use of language. These diaries, consisting of refined forms and scattered phrases, carefully positioned on otherwise empty grounds, have designated her public output, generally providing the content for her exhibitions in the form of pages torn from the notebooks arranged in novel constellations. These constellations have a high level of poetic strength as well as a striking fragility.

The individual documents information that is frequently overlooked and provides commentary through a combination of images and text. This process involves observing and commenting on both local environments and broader global contexts.

She has three published books by Toohcsmi, Uitgevers, two books with Lannoo Publishers: one collaboration book with Japanese photographer Masao Yamamoto and one pure textual book.

She started a new collaboration with Hannibal Publishing in 2016. Arpaïs Du Bois has been working on a daily blog since 2008 called "Instant de jour et dessin d'un soir", which is a daily posted photograph combined with a daily drawing.

=== Reception ===
Concerning Du Bois's artwork, Roger Pierre Turine has stated, "Between dreams, pains, fears and passing euphoria, they are witness drawings and crutches to the artist whenever she doubts." Anne-Marie Poels remarked, "Du Bois sees, thinks, feels, hears and lets the result of this flow onto paper".

=== Bibliography ===
- Bundel Lichamen, Toohcsmi, 2001
- Histoire, Imschoot, 2004
- Des illusions virgule, Toohcsmi, 2005
- Where We Met, Lannoo Publishers, 2011, (ISBN 978-90-209-5788-4)
- Petit livre qui ne tient pas debout, Lannoo Publishers, 2013, (ISBN 978-94-014-1102-8)
- Tout droit vers la fin en sifflotant, Hannibal Publishing, 2016, (ISBN 978-94-9208-156-8)
- Ma belle saison chez Vincent, gallery 51, 2017, (ISBN 978-90-8177-256-3)

== See also ==
- List of Belgian painters
