= May Néama =

Artist (b. 1917, d. 2007)

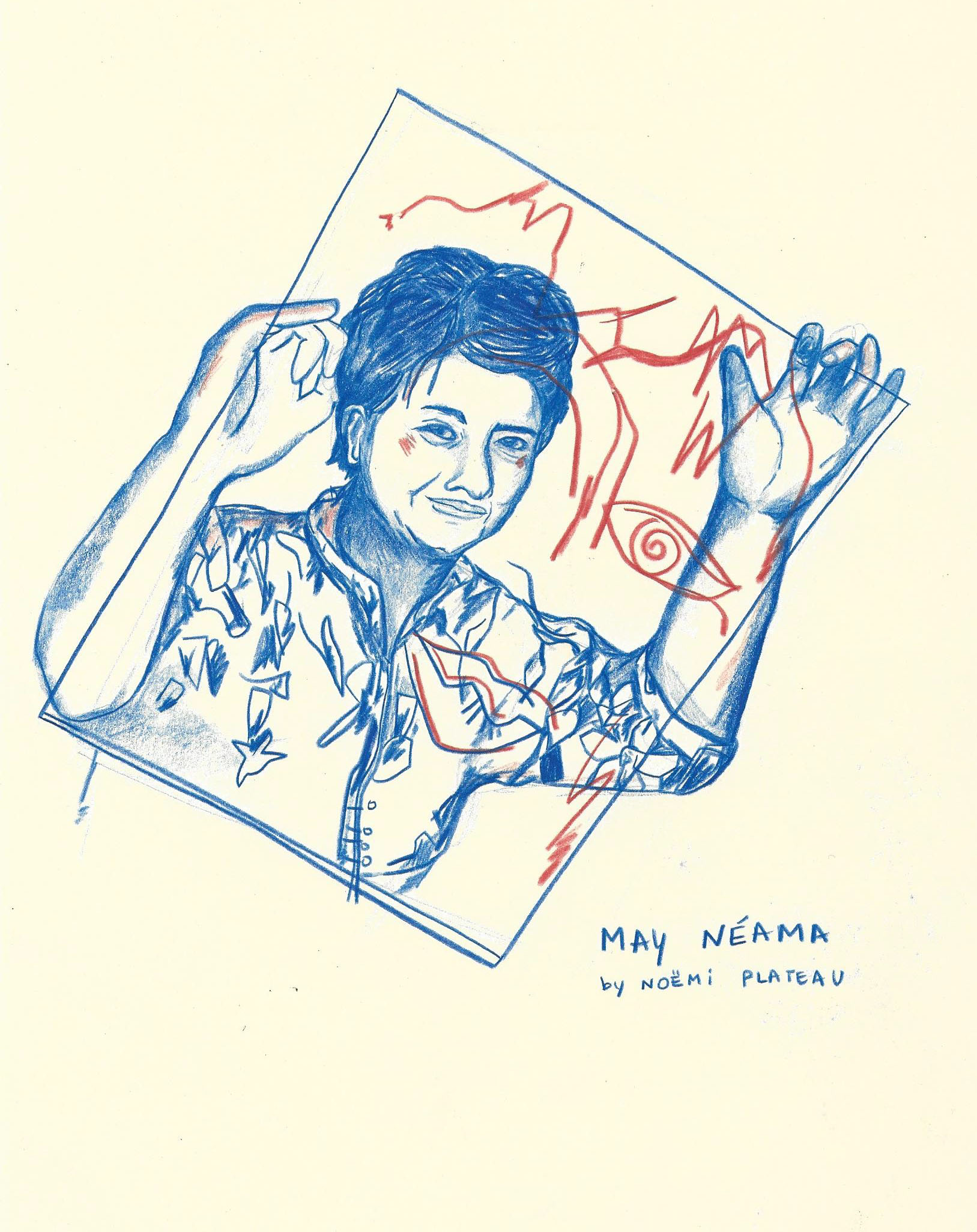
- Portret of May Néama - by Noëmi
- Born: 13 March 1917; Vienna, Austria
- Died: 25 November 2007 (aged 90); Antwerp, Belgium

May Néama (Vienna, 1917 – Antwerp, 2007) was an Antwerp artist. She was most known as a painter, illustrator, sculptor and graphic artist. She designed posters, decorations for the interior, illustrations for children’s book, stage sets and costumes, stamps, banknotes, advertising and packaging, playing cards. Néama was also member of the ‘Formes Nouvelles’ and won several prizes, including the “Prize Deauville” (1961), the “Biennial Prize of the Province of Antwerp” (1965), the Prize of the National Bank (1973) and the Golden Palm in Monaco (1974). She died on 25 November 2007 at the age of 90. Her ashes were scattered into nature in Antwerp, Belgium.

== Education ==
May Néama was born on 13 March 1917 in Vienna, Austria, as a descendant of a Spanish family. From 1932 to 1939 she studied at the Vocational School for Artists’ Crafts in Antwerp, Belgium, which was founded on 15 May 1926. The school was given this name on 15 September 1928. Before that it was called ‘De Vrije Acadamie’. Avermaete and Minne also were her main teachers that period.

In 1960 the school changed her name again to ‘Municipal Academy of Art Crafts ‘Roger Avermaete’. Néamas main teachers continued to be Joris Minne and Roger Avermaete. Néama graduated with the jury’s congratulations with her project ‘the greatest fruit’. Roger Avermaete became her husband after they married in 1946. Beside this, Avermaete played another role in her life as a writer and art critic. From 1946 she became a teacher herself at that school in courses as decoration and window art. In 1966 she taught advertising art at that same school, and two years she also taught in the stage of technology.

== Career ==
In 1937 Néama made an exhibition of set and costume designs in the Belgian Pavilion for Education at the World Fair 1973 in Paris. Two years later, on behalf of the Belgian government, she arranged the decoration of the cinema of the Belgian pavilion at the World Fair in New York City. She also decorated the stands for private companies. She also designed for large pharmaceutical companies including Roche, advertising and packaging.

May Néama produced posters and designed the decorations for the large Belgian passenger ships. She illustrated a huge number of books, preferably children's books, including for The Limited Editions Club of New York, The International Bode Guild of Lausanne, the Folio Society of London. She also illustrated books published by Ibis in Paris, Lumière in Brussels, The Folio Society of London and La Guilde international du Livre in Lausanne. Néama designed various series of Belgian stamps, including the stamp of the Queen Elisabeth Competition (n ° 2176) and César Franck (n ° 2175) for the European Year of Music. Yes, and even banknotes.

In 1940 Néama created the set and costumes for the opera ‘Le Pauvre Matelot’ by Jean Cocteau and Darius Milhaud, which was established on 8 February 1940 by the Royal Art Association of Antwerp. From 1937 Néama created more than 80 stage productions for which she designed the costumes and sets. She designed the scénographies for various theatres and dance groups as: the National Theatres of Brussel, Gent and Antwerp, the dance group of Jeanna and Jos Brabants, the one of Lea Daan, the Ballet of the twentieth century, the ballet of Wallonia and the Royal National Opera and the Royal Flemish Opera in Antwerp.

Stamp made by May Néama for the Ethnographic Museum of Antwerp in 1988

Since 1952 she had a continuous collaboration with Produits Roche in Brussels until 1974 for which she delivered dozens of designs. Néama was the first artist whose applied graphic work was included in the Print Room of the Royal Albert I Library in Brussels. In 1974 she was commissioned by the Province of Limburg to create and realise the museological design of the Masereel House in Bokrijk “De Drie Mollen”. She created and executed the designs. 10 years later, Néama is asked to design two stamps. In 1976 she designed for the ‘Club français de la Médaille de Médaille’ for Christophe Plantin.

May Néama was a pioneer in the renewal of the Belgian medal. She was asked by the Monnaie de Paris to design medals and received several commissions from Antwerp authorities in which she resolutely breaks with the traditional round shape. For one of her first medals she chose the two-dimensional line engraving (flat engraving). Technically she sought the cooperation of master engraver Paul Huybrechts (Belgium's most productive engraver). He made sure she could complement her ability. Her big problem was the combination of two-dimensional and three-dimensional engraving work. In her medal for “Imalso” (1983) you can see these two techniques. Front and reverse merge accurately and the depicted buildings provide simplicity. For the other medals she used the modelling technique. A technique that she also fully mastered. Another characteristic of her work is that she portrays the sitter in front view, which only few medallists can handle, because it is too difficult. When asked how she designs a medal, she answered the following:

First and foremost, I do as much research as possible on the subject or person. I want to know as much as possible to be able to depict as little as possible. I particularly like to use clay because I should be able to read a medal with the tips of my fingers as if I were blind. She liked to quote the words of the French philosopher Jean Guitton: The art medal is a miracle of unity between the minimum and the maximum: limit the extension but also create a cosmos in miniature.

== Works ==
In 1969 Néama created already more than 75 creations as sets and costumes for:

- The National Theatre in Brussels
- Royal Dutch Theatre (Antwerp) and Royal Dutch Theatre (Ghent)
- The National Dance Festival in Antwerp
- Flemish Opera
- De Gezusters Brabants in Antwerp
- The Dance school of Lea Daan in Antwerpen
- Maurice Béjart's Ballet of the XXth Century
- The Festival of Flanders with the Ballet André Leclair

Other works she has performed:

- Wall decorations for the ships: Baudouinville, Moliro, Rubens, Van Dijck, Jordaens and Bruegel
- Relief of several pages for the Golden Book of Public Welfare in Antwerp
- Participation in the Annual Exhibition of stage sets in the Doge's Palace (Venice)
- Personal and collective exhibitions in Antwerp, Brussels, Deauville, Florence, Geneva, Lille, London, Monte-Carlo, New York, Ostend, Paris, Porto, Ronquières and Venice

She illustrated many books for publishers:

- L.H.S, Ibis, Rombaldi, Gründ and Seghers in Paris
- Lumière in Brussels
- Colibri and Standaard Boekhandel in Antwerp
- The Folio Society in London
- Guilde international du Livre in Lausanne
- Casterman in Tournai
- Brepols in Turnhout

== Prizes and awards ==
After World War II, Néama was repeatedly awarded, including by the Province of Antwerp for the Grand Prix International de Deauville.

- 1961: Deauville Prize
- 1965: Biennial prize of the Province of Antwerp
- 1973: Prize for Ideas Competition of the National Bank of Belgium
- 1974: Golden Palm, Monaco
- 1979: Laureate of the International Medals Competition in Lisbon

== Sources ==
- "Collectiebeschrijvingen" [Collection of May Néama]. anet.be (in Dutch). Hendrik Conscience Heritage Library.
- Luc Vandamme, ‘May Néama (1917-2007). Medals, stamps and banknotes’. Published by Limburg Commission for Numismatics, 2019 (library VAi).
- Vandamme. L.& Van Laere R., Multiple Choice - ZES VROUWELIJKE MEDAILLEURS, Hasselt, 2020
- "Letterenhuis" [The Archive of May Néama in the Letterenhuis in Antwerp]. Letterenhuis (in Dutch). Letterenhuis.
- Andriesw (2010-03-08). "Grafiek uit De Antwerpse School: Neama May (1917 - 2007 )". Grafiek uit De Antwerpse School.
- Dewilde, J. "FORUM+ | Decorontwerpen van May Néama" [Decor designs by May Néama]. www.forum-online.be (in Dutch). Koninklijk conservatorium, Antwerpen.
