= Isabelle Catherine van Assche =

Belgian painter

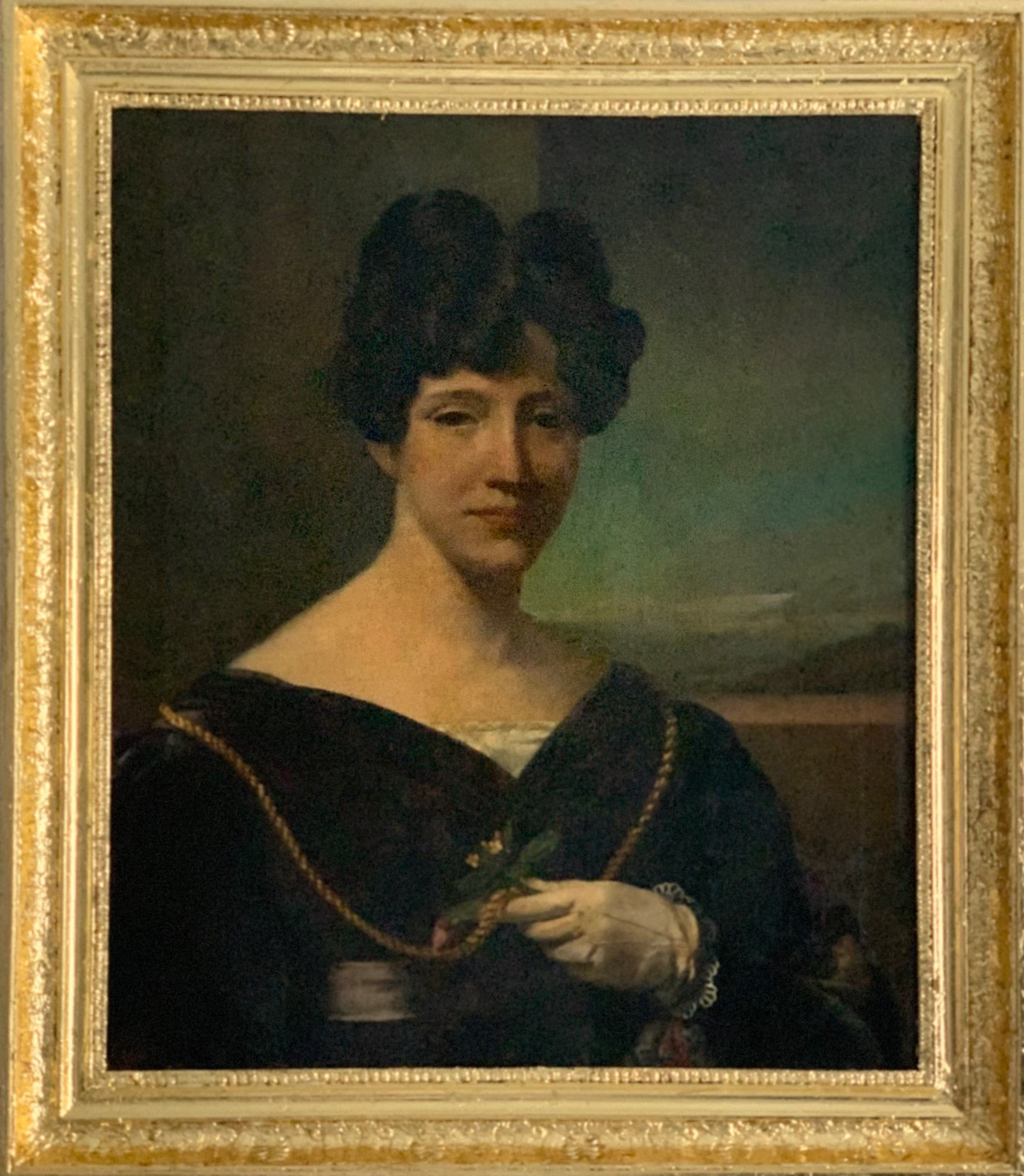
- Born: 23 November 1794; City of Brussels
- Died: 15 February 1878 (aged 83); Ixelles
- Occupation: Painter

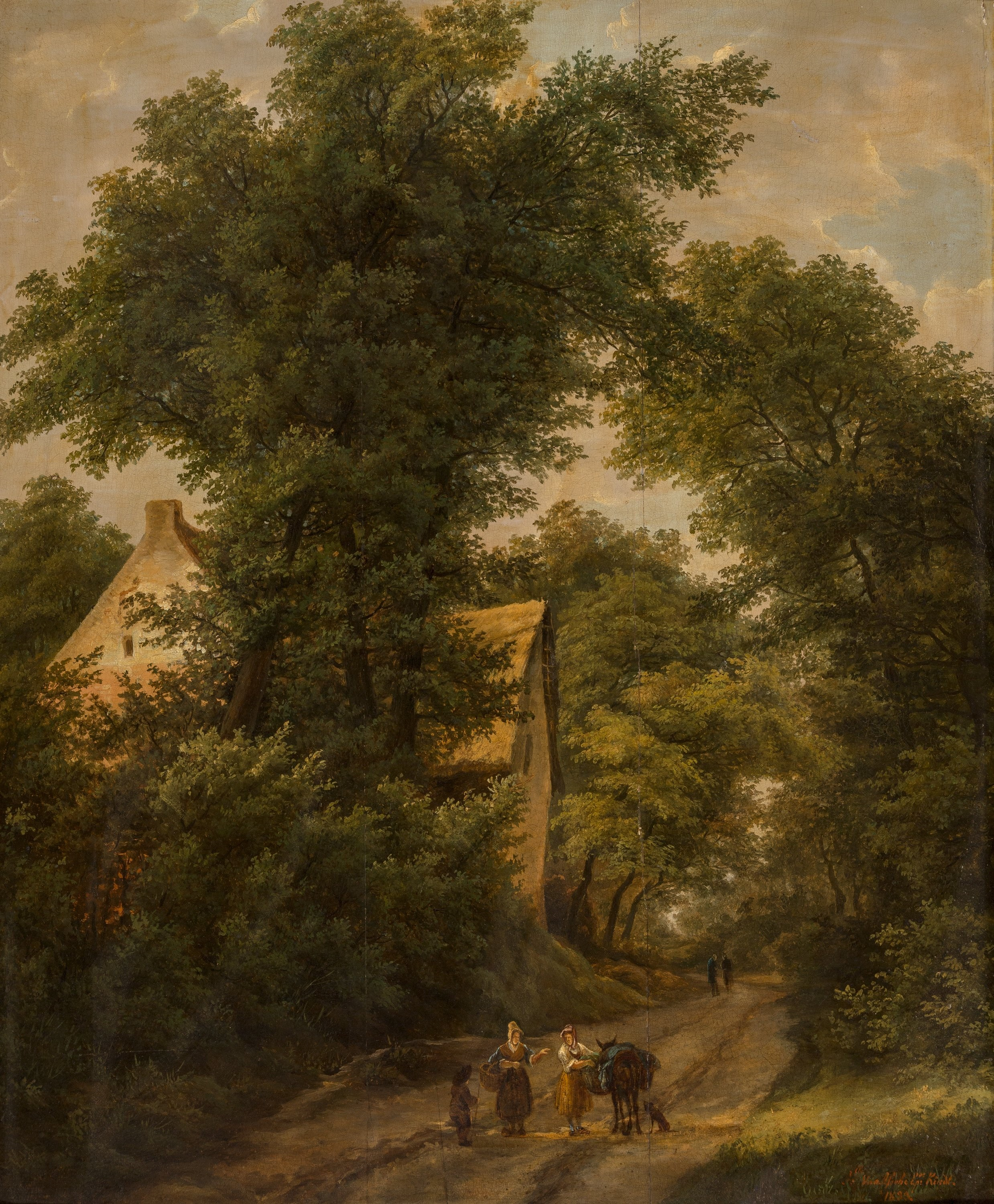
A Long Way Home (1833)

Isabelle Cathérine Kindt-van Assche (Note: Also spelt as Isabel, or Isabella. Surname from husband after marriage comes before maiden name in Dutch.) (23 November 1794 – 15 February 1878) was a Belgian landscape painter from Brussels.

She was a pupil of her uncle, Henri Van Assche. In 1828, she married Charles-Léon Kindt. Her subjects were all taken from the neighbourhood of Brussels.

As early as 1812 and 1813, two of her watercolours were displayed in Ghent and Brussels. She was represented in the exhibitions at Ghent in 1826, 1829 (where she took first prize) and 1835; at Brussels in 1827 and 1842; at Antwerp in 1834, 1837 and 1840; and at Liège in 1836. One of her paintings belongs to the collection in the Haarlem Paviljoen Welgelegen.
