= Isabel Miramontes =

- Born: 1962 (age 63–64); Santiago de Compostela
- Style: Abstract art Surrealism

Isabel Miramontes (born 1962) is a Spanish-born Belgian sculptor. She is known for disproportionate bronze sculptures of the human figure.

== Biography ==
Miramontes was born in Santiago de Compostela. She obtained a diploma in fine arts at Institut Sainte Marie in Brussels. She continued her studies at the Fine Arts Academy of Saint-Gilles.

== Work ==
Miramontes generally uses bronze as a medium in sculpture. She exhibits the human body's motion and splits it into strips, spirals and twisted forms, and this fluidity is contrasted by the face which is of blank expression. A sense of drama and tension is implied with this juxtaposition. Miramontes aims to convey not just the physical activity but also the emotional one — representing the psyche’s ambiguous power and fragility, dreams and successes, or desire for isolation and freedom.

Space is an important aspect in Miramontes’ works. She creates abstract and surrealist sculptures that plays with perspective and proportion, as evident with its exaggerated movements and elongated bodies.

== Selected works ==
- Siesta
- Seaside
- Tango
- Primavera
- Entasis
- Amor
- Corps Accord
- Songe
- Fauteuil
- Arobase
- My Way
