= Henri Van Assche =

Belgian painter

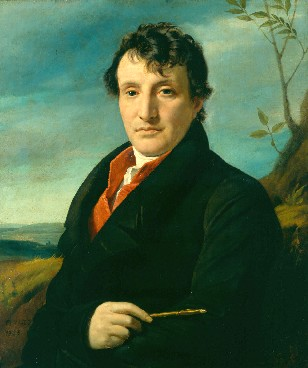
Henri van Assche; portrait by François-Joseph Navez (1823)

Henri Van Assche (30 August 1774, Brussels - 10 April 1841, Brussels) was a Belgian painter; primarily of landscapes. He was especially well-known for his depictions of waterfalls and water mills. Some of his scenes contain animals painted by Balthasar Paul Ommeganck.

== Biography ==
His father, Joseph François Van Assche, was a master brewer who served as Dean of the "Corporation of Brewers" in 1771 and 1794. When he began showing a talent for drawing, he was given lessons in design and perspective by his father, who was also an amateur artist, then received formal training from Jean-Baptiste De Roy. After that, he made study trips through Switzerland and Italy, which developed his predilection for landscapes. Later, he became known as "The Painter of Waterfalls".

He held his first exhibits at the Ghent Salon, and was a member of the Société de peinture, sculpture et architecture de Bruxelles. His other memberships included the Royal Academy of Fine Arts (Antwerp), and the Royal Academy of Visual Arts in Amsterdam. Many of his works may be seen in public and private collections in Brussels, Ghent, Lille, and Haarlem.

He died in Brussels and was buried in Neder-Over-Heembeek.

One of his nieces and a nephew were also painters : Isabelle Catherine van Assche, who was one of his students, and François De Marneffe, the son of Pierre-Joseph De Marneffe, his brother-in-law, who was an art dealer.
