= Sophie Cauvin =

Belgian painter

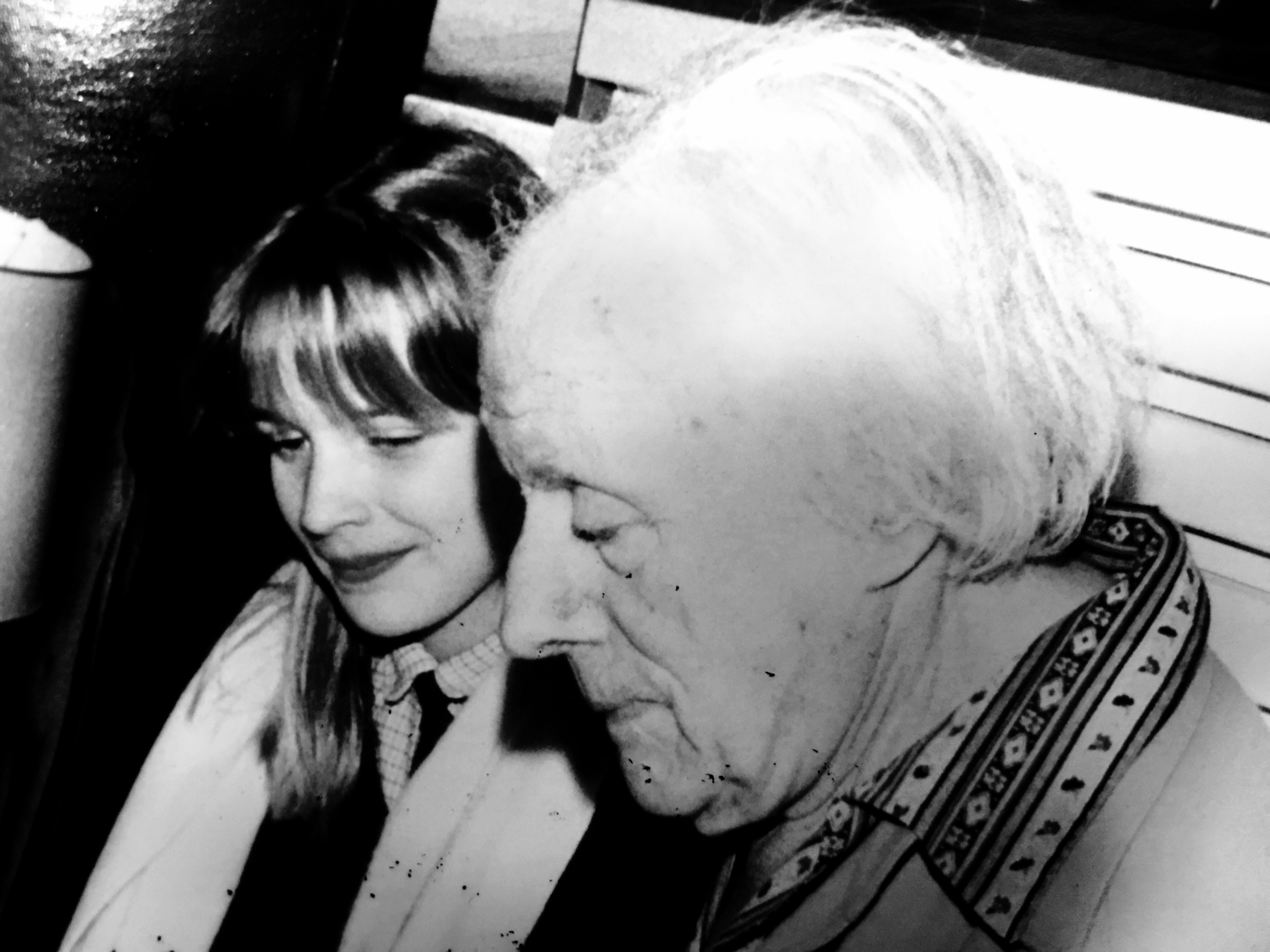
- Cauvin (left) and Paul Delvaux in October 1985
- Born: 2 April 1968 (age 58); Braine-l'Alleud, Belgium
- Education: The Royal Academies for Science and the Arts of Belgium.
- Known for: Painting

Sophie Cauvin (born 2 April 1968 in Braine-l'Alleud) is a Belgian painter.

== Personal background ==
Sophie Cauvin was born on 2 April 1968 in Braine-l'Alleud, Walloon Brabant, Belgium. She studied at The Royal Academies for Science and the Arts of Belgium.

== Exhibitions ==
- 2004: 5 Bruxelloises Art and Advice at Hasselt Gallery
- 2004: Galerie Sans Nom, Brussels
- 2005: Personal exhibition at Lucca Gallery New York City
- 2006: Galerie Grard Neuchâtel, Switzerland
- 2007: Personal exhibition at Gaudaen Galerij, Grimbergen
- 2009: Women Art Show, Brussels
- 2010: Guy Pieters Gallery Knokke Belgique

== Films ==
- 2024: On Melting Snow (2024) as herself. The documentary directed and produced by Mojtaba Bahadori follows Cauvin and explores her artistic philosophy and the connection between art and nature. The film won 2024 United Nations Prize, COP29 at Dokubaku International Film Festival, Azerbaijan.
