= Magda Kint =

Belgian artist

Magda Kint (born 1936) is a Belgian artist.

She was born in Ninove. Kint was self-taught. She lived in central Africa from 1954 to 1960; there she developed a love of nature that manifested itself in her art. She worked in oil and watercolor.

Kint was awarded the prize of the city of Leuven in 1970 and was a winner in the National Drawing Contest (Nationale Tekenwedstrijd) at Kortenberg in 1971. Her work is held in the national collection of Belgium.
