= Danse =

Danse (French for Dance) may refer to:

== Music ==
- Danse (Satie), a short 1890 instrumental piece by Erik Satie
- "Danse" (song), a 2010 song by Grégoire

== People ==
- Auguste Danse (1829–1929), Belgian engraver and etcher
- Louise Danse (1867–1948), Belgian painter
- Marie Danse (1866–1942), Belgian painter and etcher

== See also ==
- La Danse (disambiguation)
- Dance (disambiguation)
