= Wesmael =

Wesmael is a surname. Notable people with the surname include:

- Alfred Wesmael (1832–1905), Belgian botanist
- Elisabeth Wesmael (1861–1953), Belgian graphic artist
- Constantin Wesmael (1798–1872), Belgian entomologist
