= Bruno Destrée =

Benedictine monk, French-language poet and Belgian literary critic

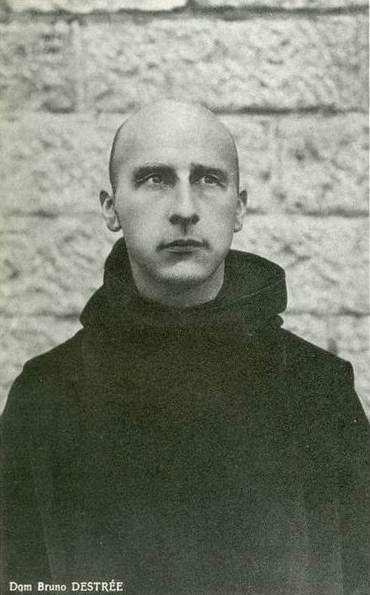
Bruno Destrée

Bruno Destrée (1867-1919) was a Benedictine monk, a French-language poet, and a Belgian literary critic. He was the brother of the politician Jules Destrée.

Bruno Destrée was a monk at Maredsous Abbey and later at Keizersberg Abbey in Leuven. He was interested in the Pre-Raphaelite Brotherhood.

== Biography ==
Georges Destrée was born in Marcinelle on 10 August 1867. He was the younger brother of the politician Jules Destrée.

Like his elder brother, he studied law at the Université libre de Bruxelles. It was then that he started putting his father's first name, Olivier, before his own. He collaborated as an art columnist in the magazine La Jeune Belgique, where he met Max Waller, Albert Giraud and Iwan Gilkin.

Anglophile, he was really enthusiastic about Pre-Raphaelite painting: in 1894, he published Les Préraphaélites : notes sur l’art décoratif et la peinture en Angleterre, the very first essay on this movement in French. In the Revue générale of October 1895, he gave a nearly complete translation of "La Lampe de la mémoire", the sixth chapter of The Seven Lamps of Architecture; a few years later, Marcel Proust’s reading of that text would be decisive in his own business of translating John Ruskin’s work.

He then collaborated with the Catholic magazine Durendal. He gradually got closer to Catholicism and decided in October 1898 to enter the Order of St. Benedict. He took the name of Dom Bruno and later left Maredsous Abbey to enter Keizersberg Abbey in Leuven. He was ordained a priest in 1903.

In 1911, he collaborated with his brother to organise the exhibition Les Arts anciens du Hainaut.

He died of peritonitis on 30 October 1919 in Leuven.

== Works ==
- 1891 – Journal des Destrée
- 1894 – Poèmes sans rimes, available on Internet Archive
- 1894 – Les Préraphaélites : notes sur l’art décoratif et la peinture en Angleterre, available on Internet Archive
- 1895 – The Renaissance of Sculpture in Belgium, available on Internet Archive
- 1897 – Les Mages
- 1898 – Trois Poèmes : Sainte Dorothée de Cappadoce; Sainte Rose de Viterbe; Saint Jean Gualbert
- 1904 – La Mère Jeanne de Saint-Mathieu Deleloë : une mystique inconnue du xviie siècle
- 1908 – Au milieu du chemin de notre vie
- 1910 – Les Bénédictins
- 1911 – L'Âme du Nord
- 1913 – Impressions et Souvenirs
- 1913 – L’Orfèvrerie religieuse : l’œuvre de Jan Brom, available on Internet Archive

== Bibliography ==
- Laurence Brogniez, "Georges-Olivier Destrée et la religion de l’art : de l’esthète au converti", in Alain Dierkens (ed.), Problèmes d’histoire des religions : Dimensions du sacré dans les littératures profanes, vol. 10, Brussels, Éditions de l’université de Bruxelles, 1999, pp 33–42
- Henry Carton de Wiart, La Vocation d’Olivier-Georges Destrée, Paris, Flammarion, coll. "Notre clergé", 1931, 248 p.
- Geneviève De Grave, Dom Bruno Destrée : l’esthète, le converti, le moine, Liège, La Pensée catholique, coll. "Études religieuses", 1942, 22 p.
- René Dethier, Les Écrivains de chez nous : Dom Bruno Destrée (Olivier-Georges), vol. VI, Charleroi, Éditions de la Jeune Wallonie, s.d., 12 p.
- Arnold Goffin, "Olivier-Georges Destrée", Durendal, no. 12, 1898, pp. 991–1000.
- Pierre Nothomb, Une conversion esthétique : Olivier-Georges Destrée, Brussels, Action catholique, coll. " Science et foi ", 1913, 51 p.
- Gladys Turquet-Milnes, "The Destrée Brothers: The Neo-Catholic Movement and Socialist Movement", in Some Modern Belgian Writers: A Critical Study, New York, Robert M. McBride & Co., 1917, pp. 129–149.
- Idesbald Van Houtryve, " Destrée (Georges of Olivier-Georges) ", in Biographie Nationale de Belgique, vol. XXXIII, Brussels, Établissements Émile Bruylant, 1965, col. 247-251.
