= Elisabeth Wesmael =

Belgian painter

- Born: 1863
- Died: 1953 (aged 89–90)

Elisabeth Wesmael (1863–1953) was a Belgian graphic artist.

== Life ==
Wesmael studied at the Academie van Bergen under Auguste Danse from 1883 till 1884, where she learned to draw and make etchings by copying pictures such as "Sparrenbos in de Kempen" by Joseph Coosemans (1828–1904) and "Het uitgaan van de Vespers" by Franz Courtens (1854–1943), both in the collection of the museum in Brussels. Later she switched to landscapes, mostly of the Ardennes ("De Samber te Thuin", "Thuin. La ville basse", "Touët de Beuil", "De Ourthe te Esneux"...). Her etching Sunset in the Campine after Coosemans, was included in the 1905 book Women Painters of the World. Her drawings also consist mostly of landscapes : "A corner of Léon Souguenet's garden", "Plateau de l'Ourthe"...

Wesmael was a member of the artist societies L'Estampe and Société des Aquafortistes Belges.

She married the writer Maurice des Ombiaux (1868–1943) and was friends with Louise Danse, her teacher Auguste Danse's daughter, who was also a graphic artist.

== Exhibitions ==
- 1907, Brussel, Salon 1907
- 1910, Brussel, L'Estampe. 4de Salon
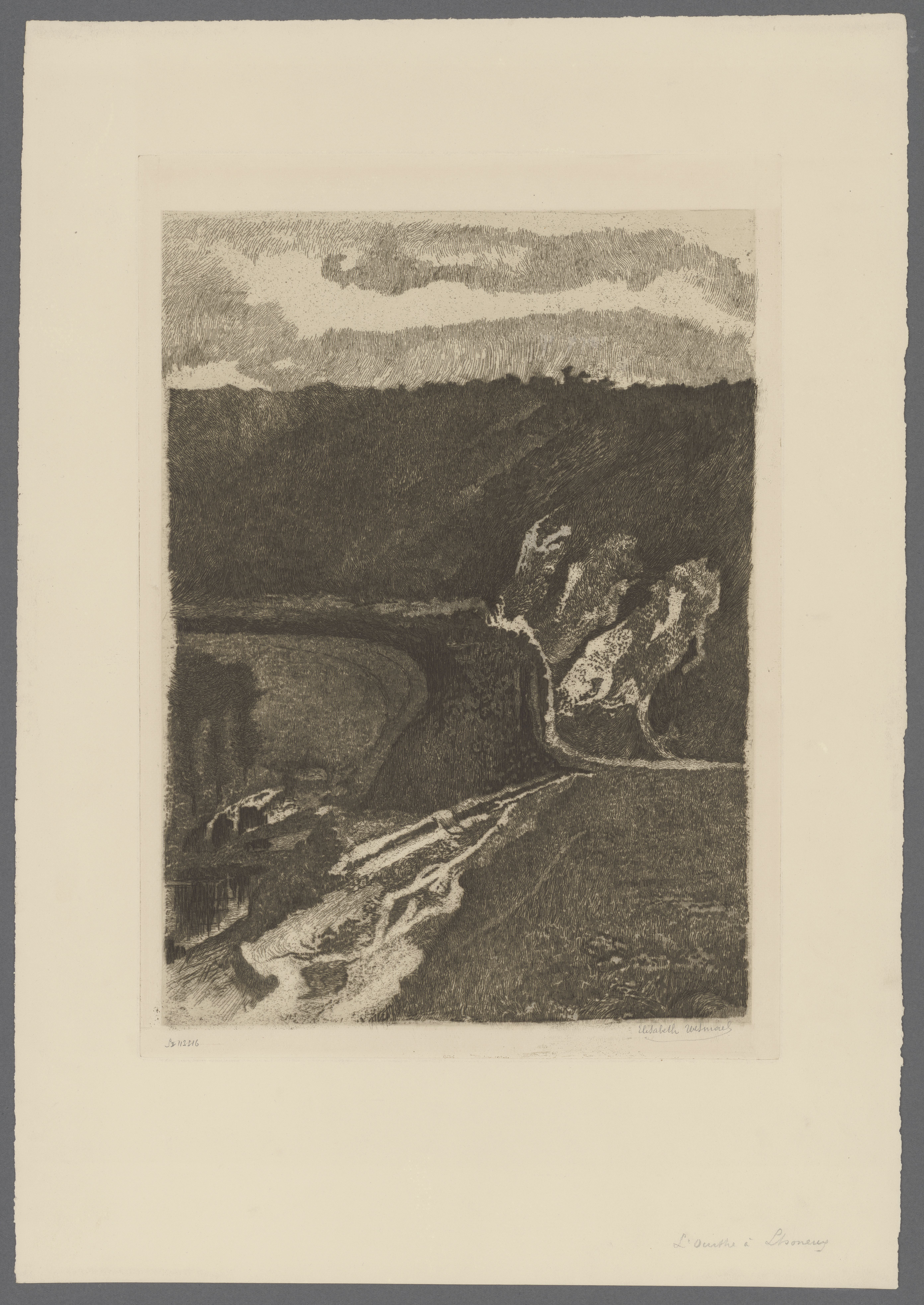
L'Ourthe at Lhoneux

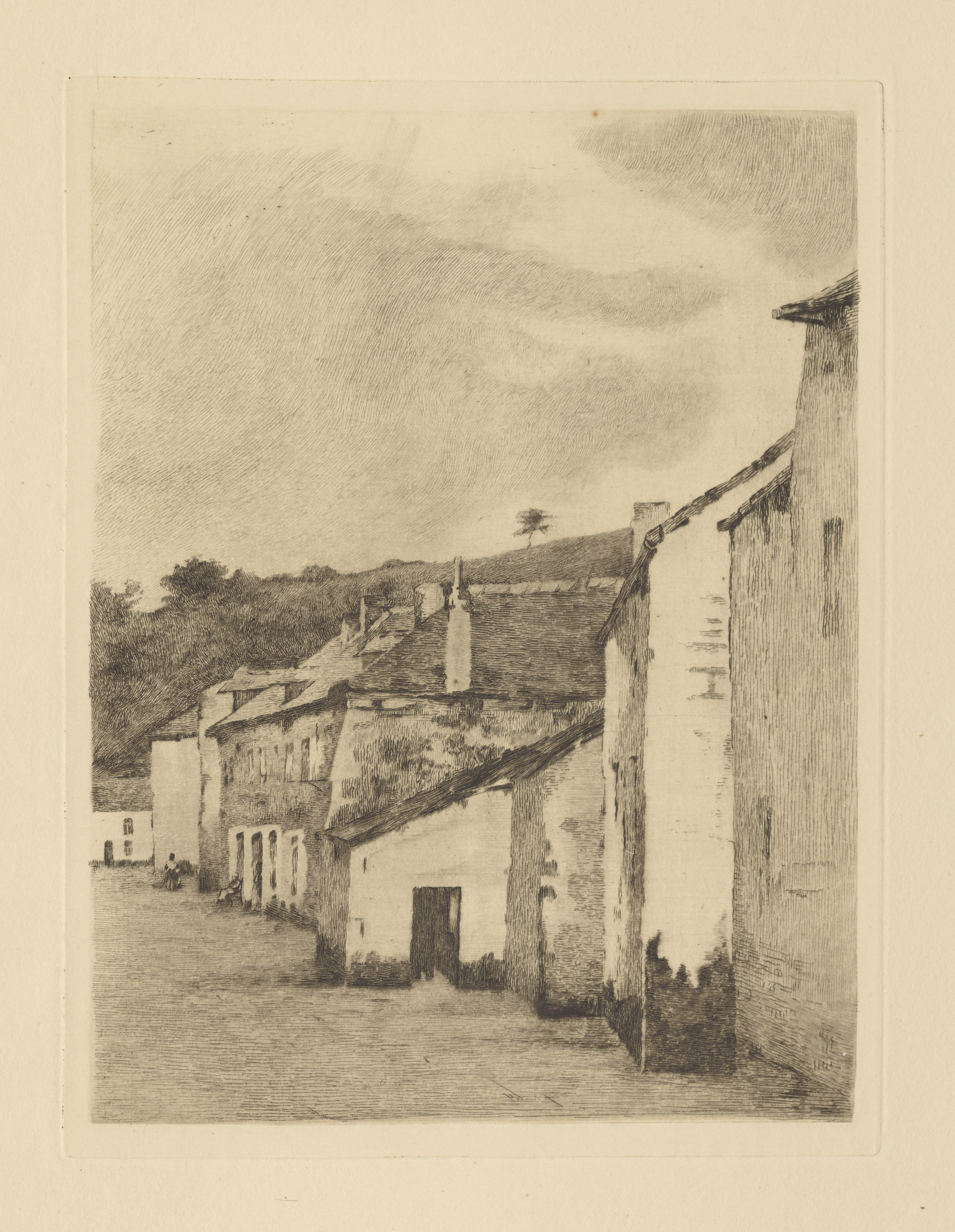
Grue a thuin

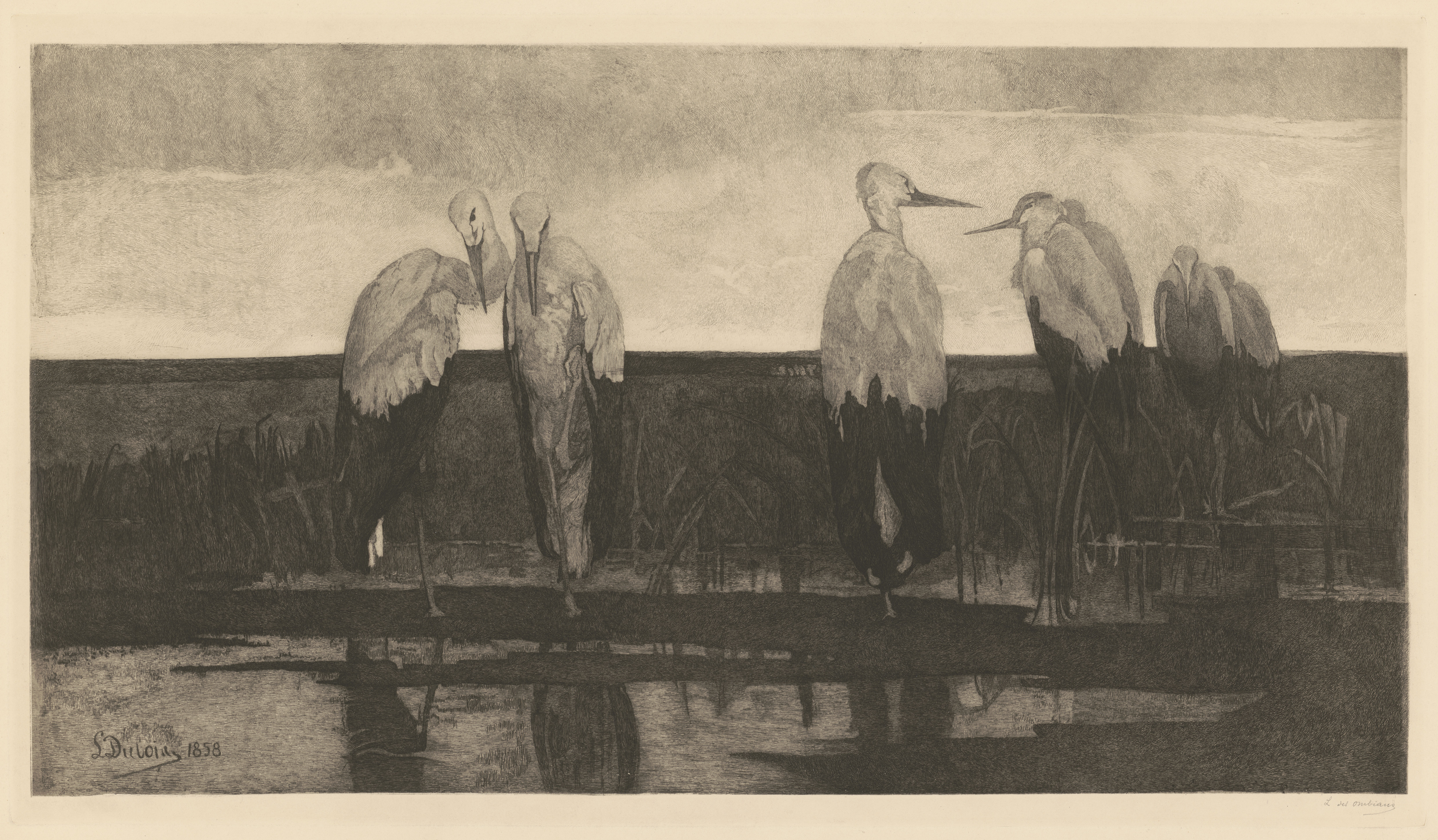
Storks

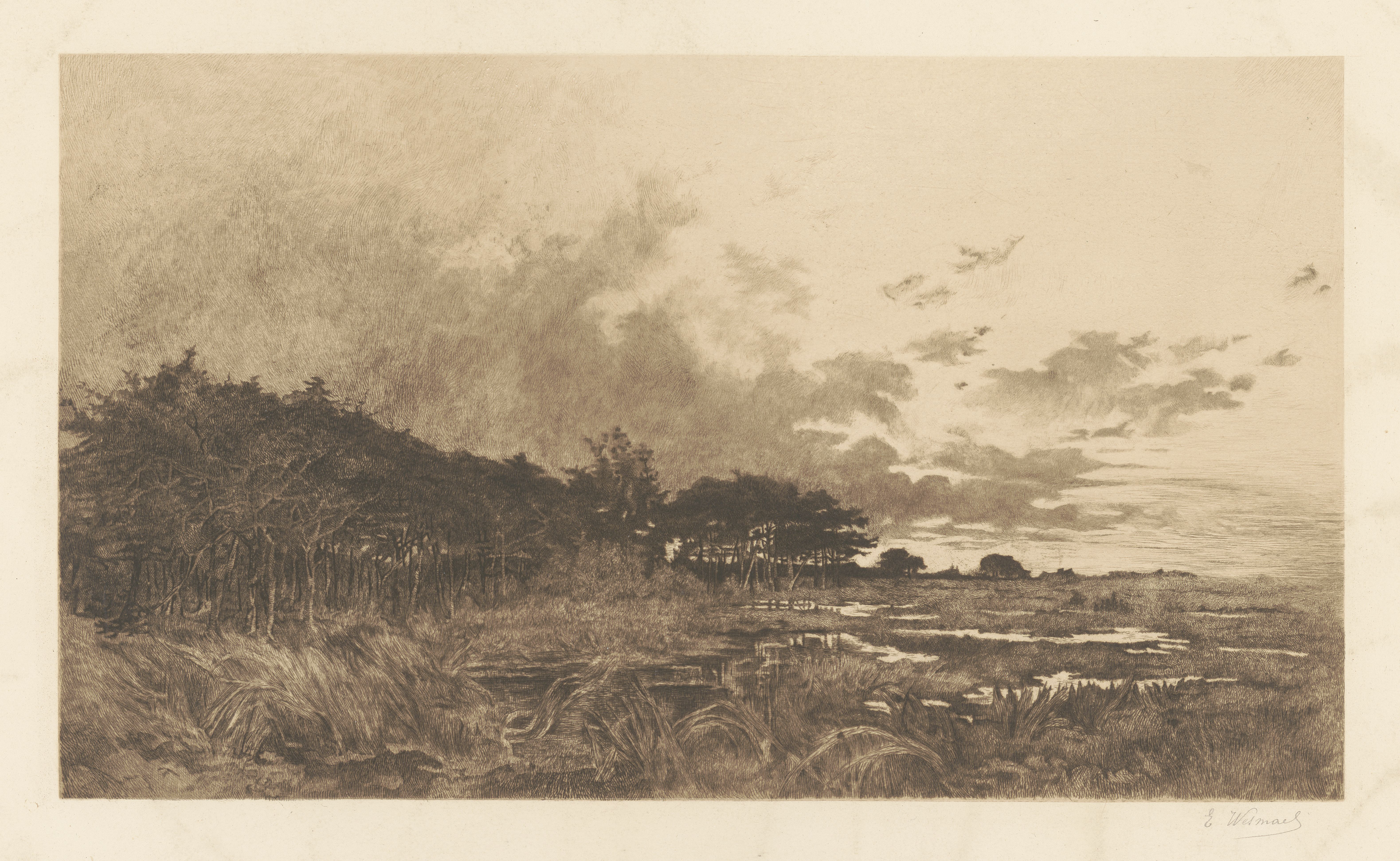
Pinetrees in the Kempen

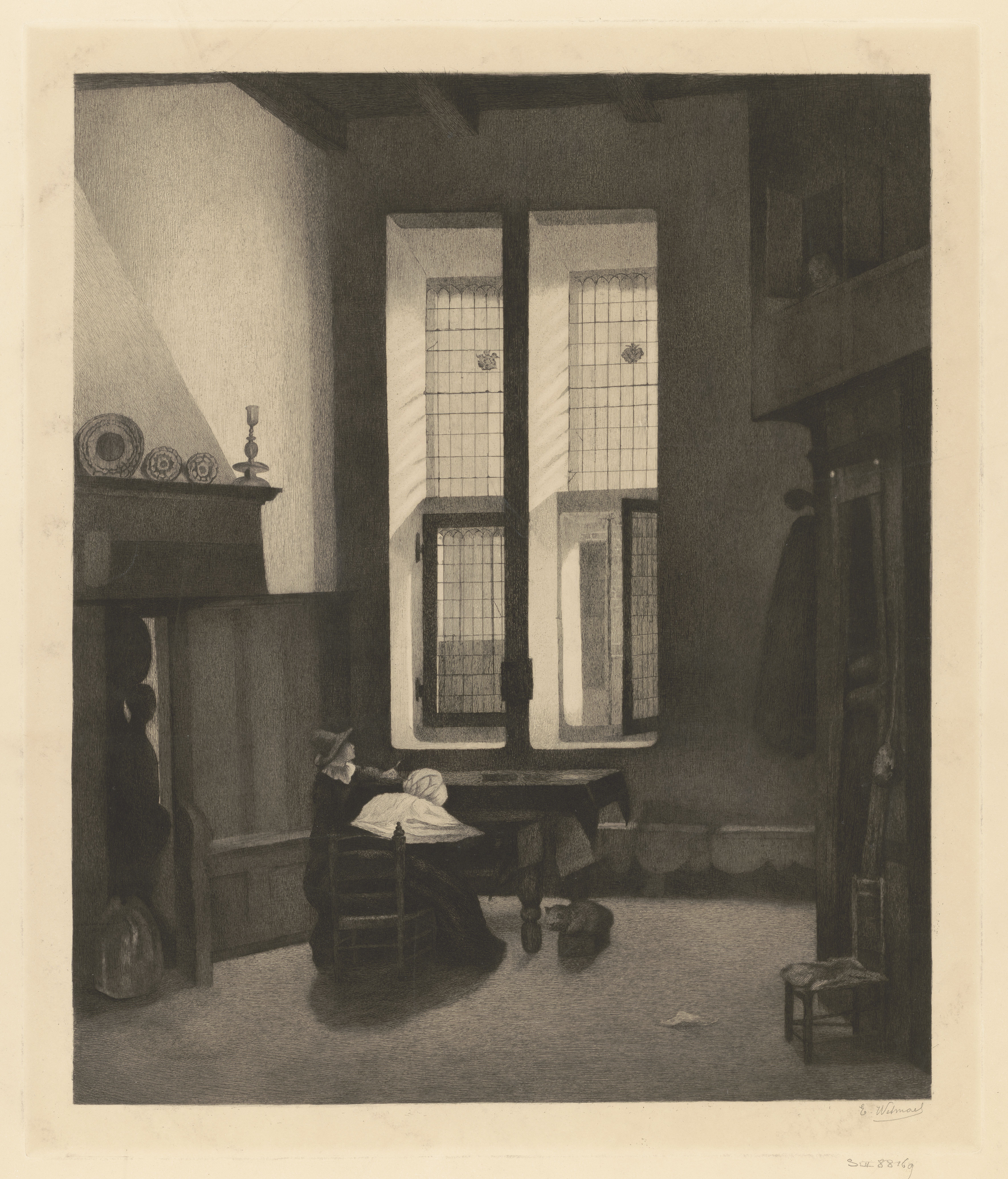
Interior, Brussels Museum

== Literature ==
- J. Ensor (ed. X. Tricot), Lettres, Brussel (Labor), 1999.
- E. Gubin (e.a.), Dictionnaire des femmes belges XIXe et XXe siècles, Brussel, 2006.
