= Paul Craps =

Belgian painter (1877–1939)

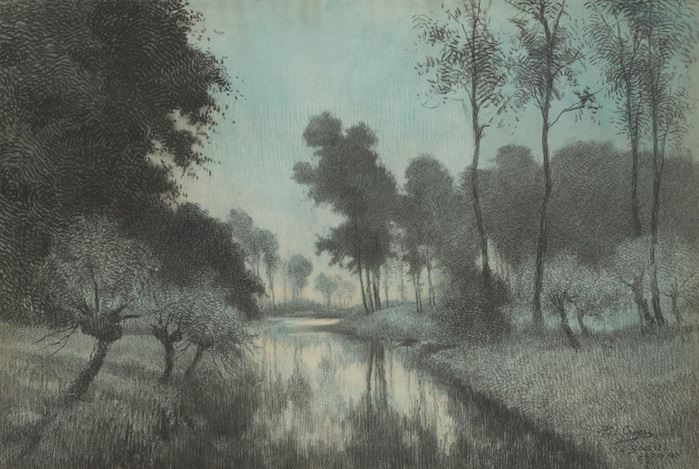
The River Senne, near Beersel.

Jean Félix Paul Craps, or Pol Craps (16 November 1877, Uccle – 27 April 1939, Drogenbos) was a Belgian painter and graphic artist.

== Biography ==
His talent for art emerged at an early age and was encouraged by his family. From 1894 to 1897, he was a student at the Royal Academy of Fine Arts, Brussels. His primary instructor there was Auguste Danse, who introduced him to various graphic techniques and had a lasting influence on his style. During this time, he published several albums of aquatints with the Société des Aquafortistes.

In 1902, he married Marie Van Elewyck, a school teacher, and settled in Drogenbos. They had seven children.

At the fourth salon held by “L’Estampe” (1910), he exhibited several etchings and monotypes that were well received. He was an active member of the "Cercle d'art d'Uccle"; helping to organize their annual exhibitions. His other memberships covered a wide range of activities, from an amateur choir to the pigeon fanciers.

Many of his portraits are of average people, but include some celebrities, such as the nurse, Edith Cavell, and his fellow artist, Emile Wauters. His landscapes are among his most familiar works. They consist largely of scenes from within a short distance of Drogenbos. A few are from as far away as the coast.

He occasionally took students. The best known was Felix De Boeck, who worked with him from 1909 to 1915. Nicolas de Staël, a neighbor, took a few lessons from him in 1934.

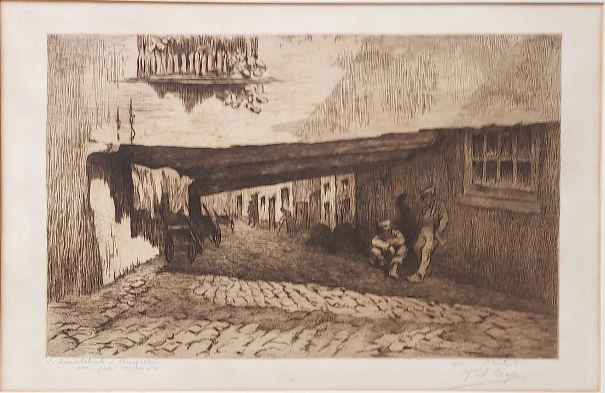
The "Devil's Corner", a poor industrial workers' neighborhood in Brussels; named after a popular pub.

Around 1935, his artistic activity diminished, and he began construction of an exhibition space in his garden. He held two showings there; upon its completion in 1937 and again in the latter part of 1938. He died early the following year.
