= Jules Destrée =

Belgian politician and cultural critic active in the Walloon Movement

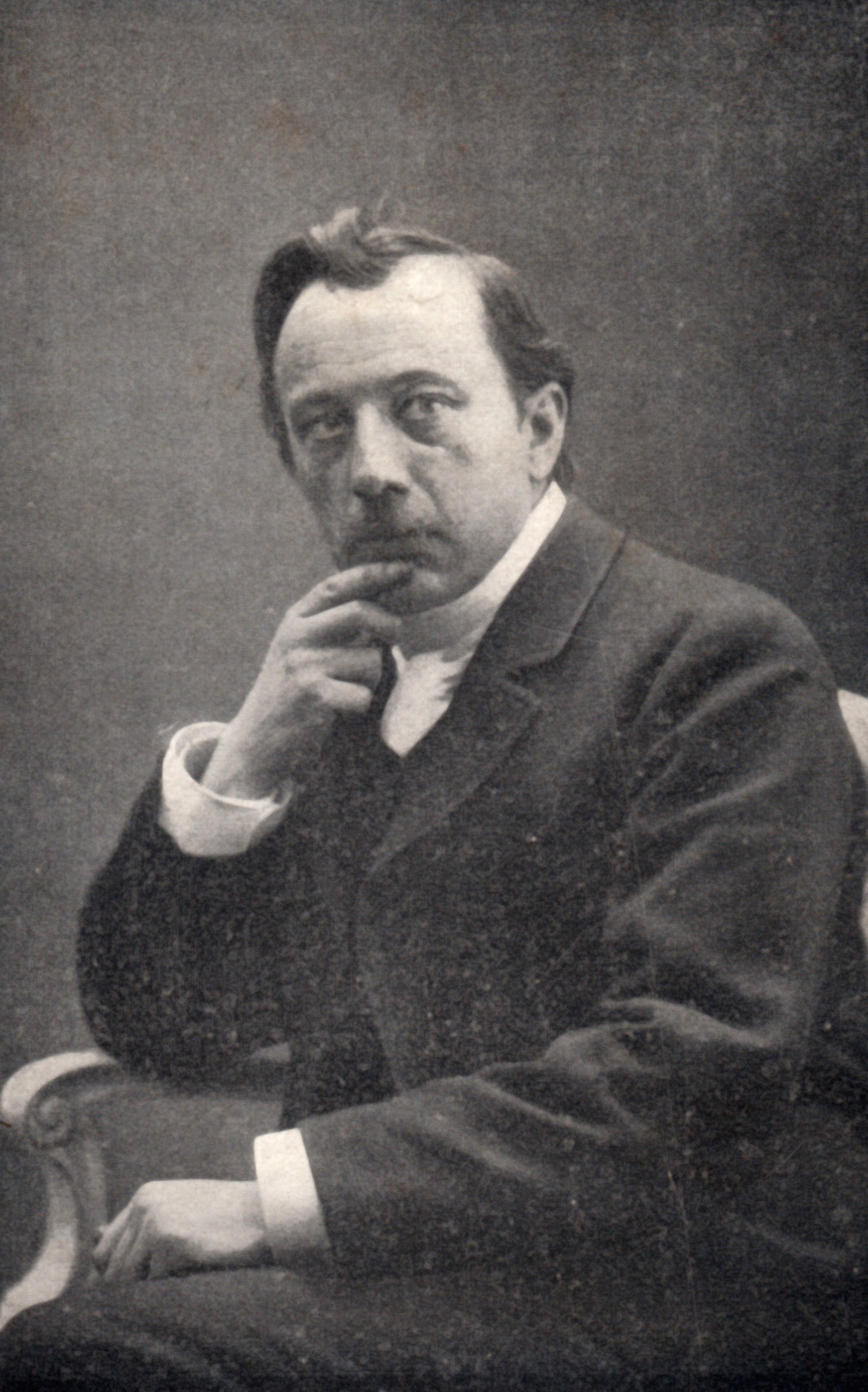
- Destrée, pictured in 1913

Personal details
- Born: 21 August 1863 Marcinelle, Hainault Province, Belgium
- Died: 3 January 1936 (aged 72) Brussels, Belgium
- Party: Belgian Labour Party

Jules Destrée (French: [dɛstʁe]; Marcinelle, 21 August 1863 – Brussels, 3 January 1936) was a Belgian lawyer, cultural critic and socialist politician from the Belgian Labour Party. Destrée is most notable for his Letter to the King in 1912, which is seen as the founding declaration of the Walloon movement.

Destrée's text argued that the creation of a Belgian nation had not broken down fundamental ethnic, linguistic, or cultural differences between Flanders and Wallonia, while pleading for some kind of federal state.

== Biography ==
His father was an engineer in the chemical industry in Marcinelle and Couillet and later became a professor. Jules himself was a gifted student, getting his PhD in Law from the Free University of Brussels at the age of 20. His younger brother, Olivier Georges, became a monk, first in the Maredsous Abbey, later in the Keizersberg Abbey in Leuven, under the name Bruno Destrée.

Besides his judicial work, he liked circulating among the artistic and literary circles of his time. There, he met etcher Auguste Danse, whose daughter Marie, a niece of Constantin Meunier, he married in 1889.

In 1892, together with Paul Pastur, he founded the Democratic Federation. He started a political career with the socialist Belgian Labour Party (Parti Ouvrier Belge, POB), and was elected as a member of the Chamber of Representatives in 1894, where he continued to work until his death.

He wrote many and diverse publications; prose, political and social works, and studies on artists (like Odilon Redon and Rogier van der Weyden).

In 1911, during an exhibition of ancient arts of the Hainaut, Jules Destrée realised that Wallonia had many specific characteristics. From then on, he advocated for an autonomous Wallonia. In November, he gave a talk in front of Jeune Barreau de Bruxelles. During this conference, he attacked what he perceived as the marginalisation of the Walloon people, saying, "We are defeated ones and defeated ones governed against our mentality.

In the context of an increasingly assertive Flemish movement, Destrée wrote his open letter in 1912 to King Albert I. The letter was published in the Revue de Belgique (15 August 1912) and in the Journal de Charleroi (24 August 1912). The largest newspapers, including la Gazette de Charleroi, l'Express and la Meuse, published the letter later on. And, in foreign countries, for instance, The New York Times published a short article about this letter.

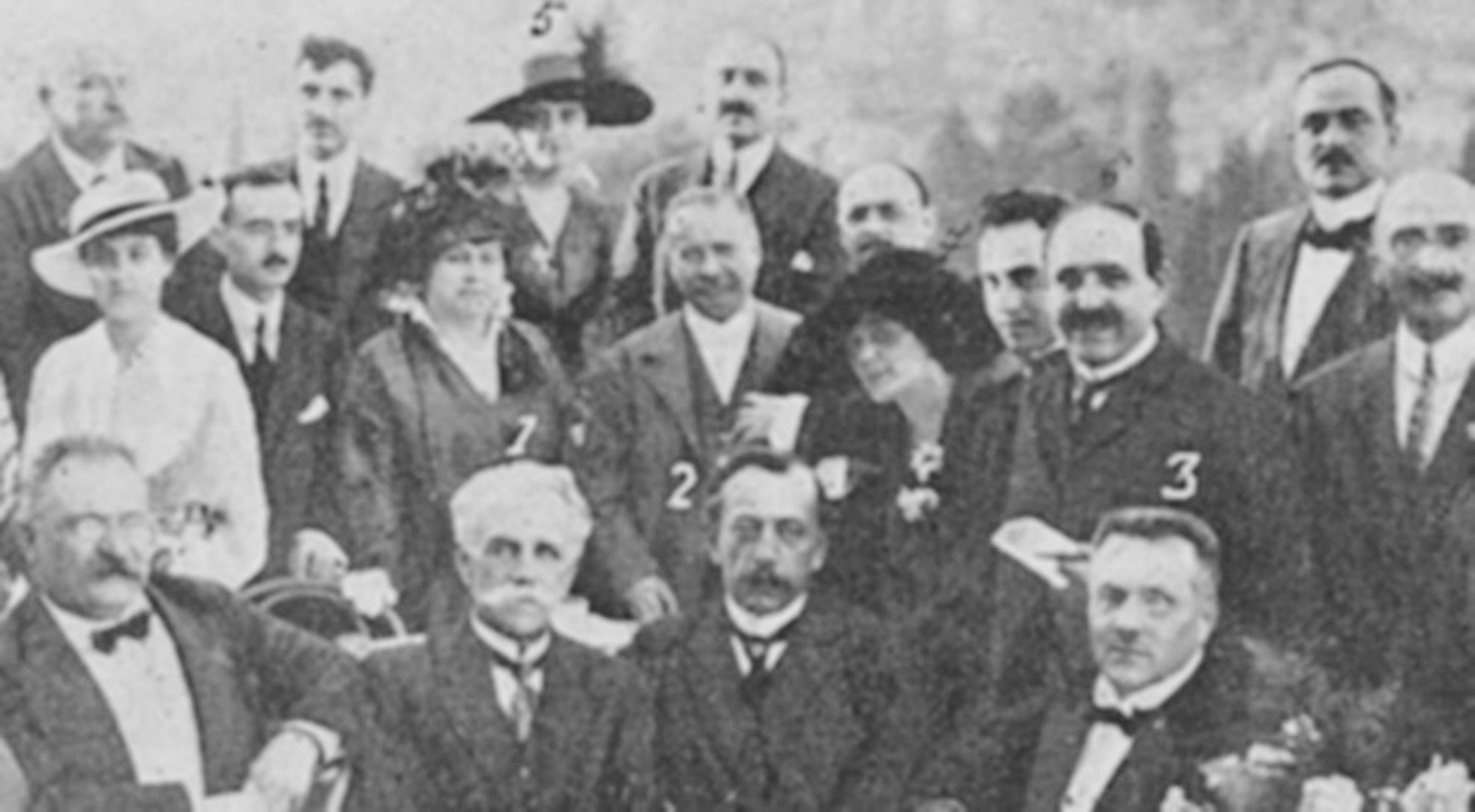
Sebastião de Magalhães Lima (1) and Destrée (2), in July 1916, at the launch in Italy of the Latina Gens society. Romanian writer Elena Bacaloglu, Latina Gens founder, is back row, marked 5.

After the German invasion of Belgium in 1914, Jules Destrée went into exile in France at the request of the Belgian government, pleading for the Belgian cause in London, Paris and Rome. He also went on diplomatic missions to the Russian Empire and China in 1918.

From 1919 to 1921, he was Minister of Arts and Sciences. He installed a "Fonds des mieux doués", a fund for the education of gifted children from poor families. In 1920, he started the Academy of French Language and Literature of Belgium (Académie de Langue et de Littérature françaises de Belgique).

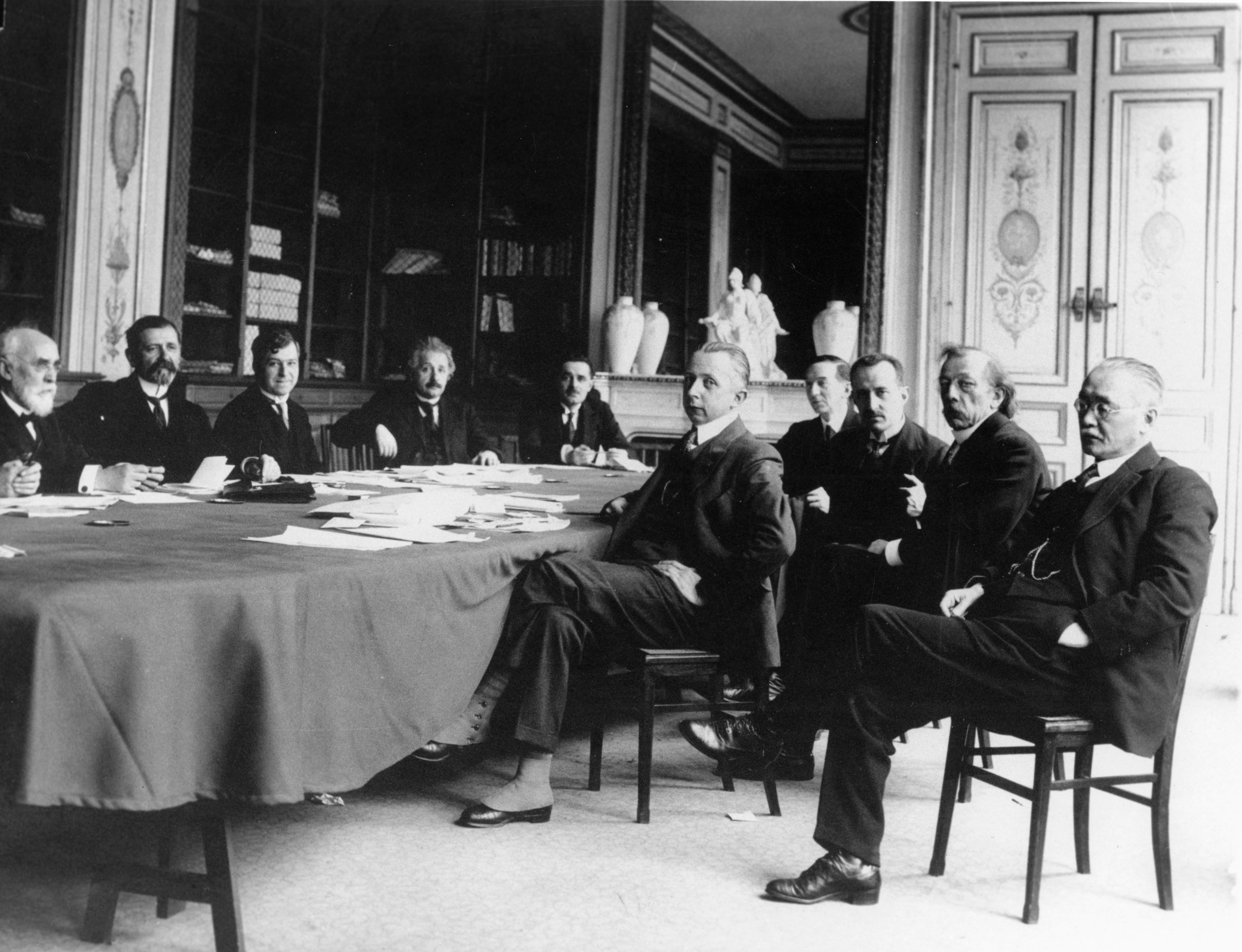
Destrée (second from the right) at a session of the International Committee on Intellectual Cooperation.

Until his death, he would continue to work on improving the political situation of Wallonia. In 1923, he left the "Assemblée wallonne" (the Walloon Assembly), which he co-founded in 1912, because it had not paid enough attention to the Walloon working class. In 1929, he signed, together with Camille Huysmans, the "Compromis des Belges" (Compromise of the Belgians). This document judged separatism, accepted the cultural autonomy of Flanders and Wallonia, and suggested a greater autonomy for municipalities and provinces. It foresaw a bilingual Flanders and a unilingual Wallonia (this was before Brabant was split and the Brussels-Capital Region was created as a separate entity).

Because of his engagement in the League of Nations' Committee on Intellectual Cooperation (between 1022 and 1932), Destrée was appointed head of the International Office of Museums (IOM), a unit of the International Institute of Intellectual Cooperation (IIIC), with Euripide Foundoukidis as secretary. In 1938, the Institut Jules Destrée was founded to promote the regional development of Wallonia. With his heritage, a museum was founded in the attic of the Town Hall of Charleroi (Musée Jules Destrée), which opened in 1988.

== Thoughts ==
According to Destrée, Belgium was composed of two separate entities, Flanders and Wallonia, and a feeling of Belgian nationalism was not possible, illustrated in his 1906 work "Une idée qui meurt: la patrie" (An idea that is dying: the fatherland). In the "Revue de Belgique" of 15 August 1912, he articulates this in his famous and notorious "Lettre au roi sur la séparation de la Wallonie et de la Flandre" (Letter to the king on the separation of Wallonia and Flanders), where he wrote:

Il y a en Belgique des Wallons et des Flamands. Il n'y a pas de Belges.
In Belgium there are Walloons and Flemings. There are no Belgians.

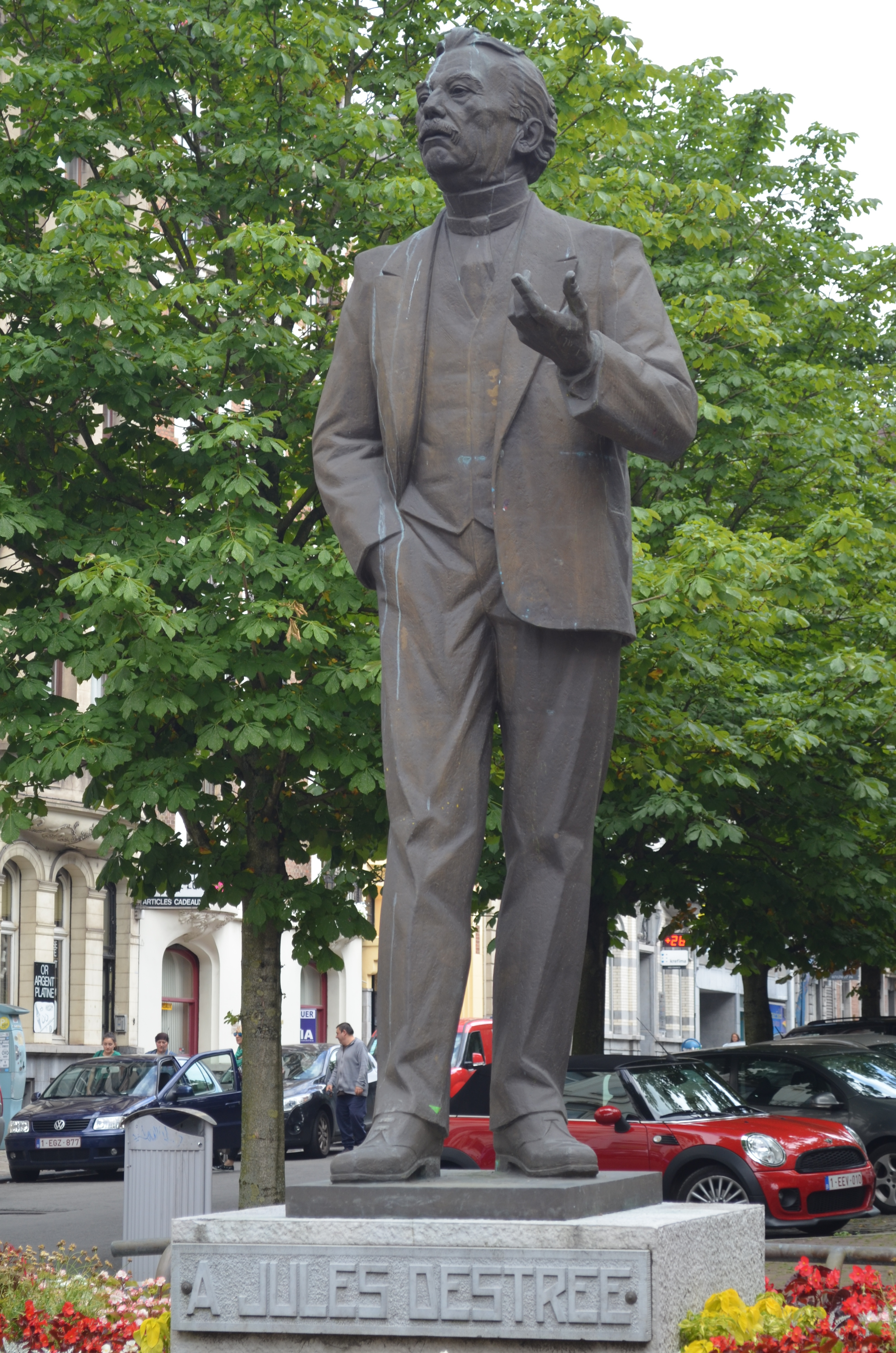
Monument to Jules Destrée in Charleroi

The King agreed secretly with the Destrée's view but not to his proposal of a kind of "Home Rule" and wrote to his counsellor: "I read the letter of Destrée, which, without uncertainty, is some literature of great talent. All that he said is absolutely true, but it is not less true that administrative separation would be an evil with more disadvantages and dangers than any aspect of the current situation." Contrary to what the title of his letter might suggest, he pleaded not for the separation of Belgium but for some kind of federal state.

Une Belgique faite de l'union de deux peuples indépendants et libres, accordés précisément à cause de cette indépendance réciproque, ne serait-elle pas un État infiniment plus robuste qu'une Belgique dont la moitié se croirait opprimée par l'autre moitié?
A Belgium made of the union of two independent and free peoples, made precisely because of this reciprocal independence, would not that be an infinitely more robust State than a Belgium in which one half would consider itself oppressed by the other half?

Destrée was concerned that Flanders, being more densely populated, would dominate a unitary Belgian state to the detriment of Wallonia. Later, Gaston Eyskens modified his quote, saying "Sire, il n'y a plus de Belges" (Sire, there are no more Belgians), after the first steps were taken to transform Belgian into a federal state.

== See also ==
- Institut Jules-Destrée
