= Auguste Danse =

Belgian artist (1829–1929)

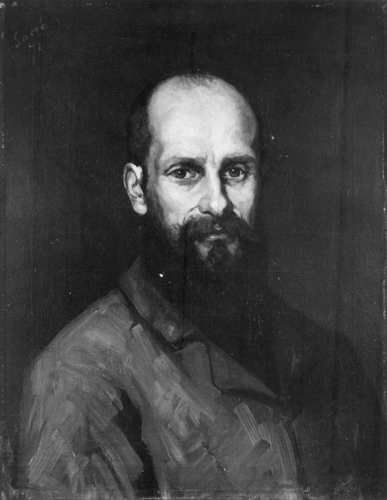
Auguste Danse, portrait by Émile Sacré (1871)

Auguste Michel Danse (13 July 1829, Brussels – 2 August 1929, Uccle) was a Belgian engraver, painter and etcher.

== Biography ==
His father, Mathieu-Joseph Danse, was a merchant. While still very young, he enrolled at the Royal Academy of Fine Arts, where he studied painting with François-Joseph Navez. He then studied engraving with Luigi Calamatta, who would be a major influence. After graduating, he was employed by Jacob Wiener and engraved medals. In 1851, he received a major commission from the Royal Academy of Science, Letters and Fine Arts to produce portraits for a series of biographies.

For many years, he earned his living from commercial work; designing stained glass windows and playing cards, and working in a textile factory, engraving the copper printing cylinders. He lost the latter position when the American Civil War made cotton difficult to obtain. From that point on, he devoted himself entirely to engraving; producing copies of the old Dutch Masters.

In 1871, he became a drawing teacher at the art academy in Mons He retained that position until his retirement in 1897, and helped create an engraving school there in 1882. At the Exposition Universelle (1889) and the Exposition Universelle (1900), he was awarded silver medals.

Beginning in the early twentieth-century, his attention turned more to painting; primarily maritime scenes and landscapes. In 1903, he produced a series of portraits for the Belgian royal family. Two years later, he became a member of the Royal Academy. He remained active until 1911. Retrospectives of his work were held that year and in 1920.

He died shortly after his hundredth birthday. A street in Uccle was named after him. The Royal Library of Belgium has a collection of his original engravings. His notable students included Paul Craps and Elisabeth Wesmael.

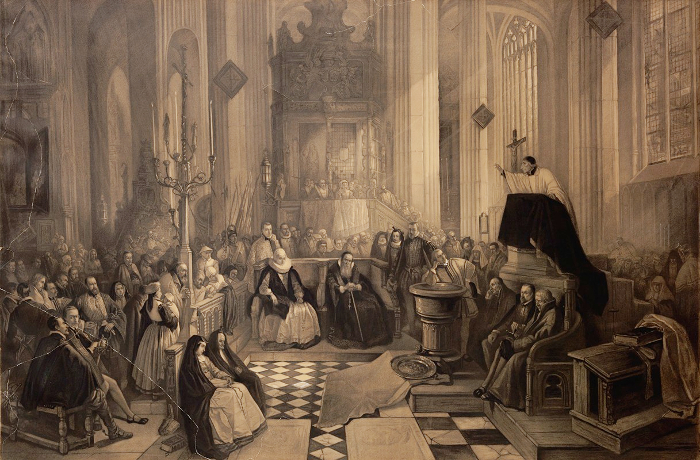
The restoration of worship at Antwerp Cathedral, following the beeldenstorm of 1566

His wife, Adèle, was the sister of Jean-Baptiste Meunier (1821–1900), a graphic artist. Their daughters, Marie and Louise, both became engravers. Marie would marry the controversial politician, Jules Destrée.
