= Marie Danse =

Belgian artist

- Marie-Charlotte Danse
- Born: February 19, 1866; Brussels
- Died: May 31, 1942 (aged 76); Brussels
- Resting place: Marcinelle
- Known for: Painting; Etching
- Spouse: Jules Destrée

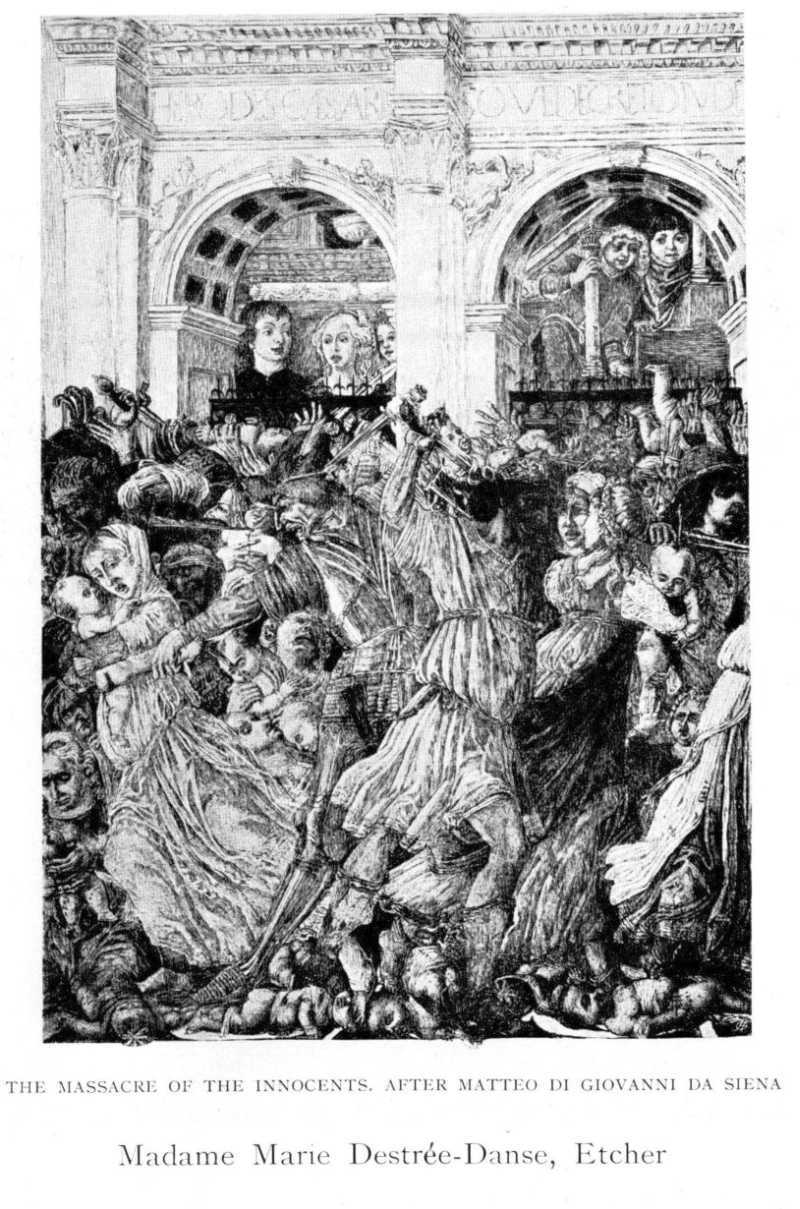
Massacre of the Innocents after Matteo di Giovanni da Siena

Marie Danse or Marie Destrée-Danse (February 19, 1866 – May 31, 1942) was a Belgian painter-etcher and the wife of the art historian and politician Jules Destrée.

== Life and work ==
Danse was born in Brussels as the daughter of the painter-etcher Auguste Danse who was her first teacher. Her sister Louise Danse was also a painter-etcher who later became known for her etchings.

Marie's etching Massacre of the Innocents after Matteo di Giovanni da Siena, was included in the 1905 book Women Painters of the World.

She became a founding member of the Brussels graphic artist collective L’Estampe in 1906, along with her sister Louise. After her husband's death in 1936 she was instrumental in founding the Institut Jules Destrée in 1938 to promote the regional development of Wallonia. With their heritage, a museum was founded in the attic of the Town Hall of Charleroi called Musée Jules Destrée, which opened in 1988.

== Bibliography ==
- Piette, Valérie; Rassart-Debergh, Marguerite (2006). "Danse, Marie". In Gubin, Éliane (ed.). Dictionnaire des femmes belges: XIXe et XXe siècles [Dictionary of Belgian women: nineteenth and twentieth centuries] (in French). Brussels: Éditions Racine. pp. 134–136. ISBN 2-87386-434-6.
