= Louise Danse =

Belgian painter (1867–1948)

- Marie-Louise Danse
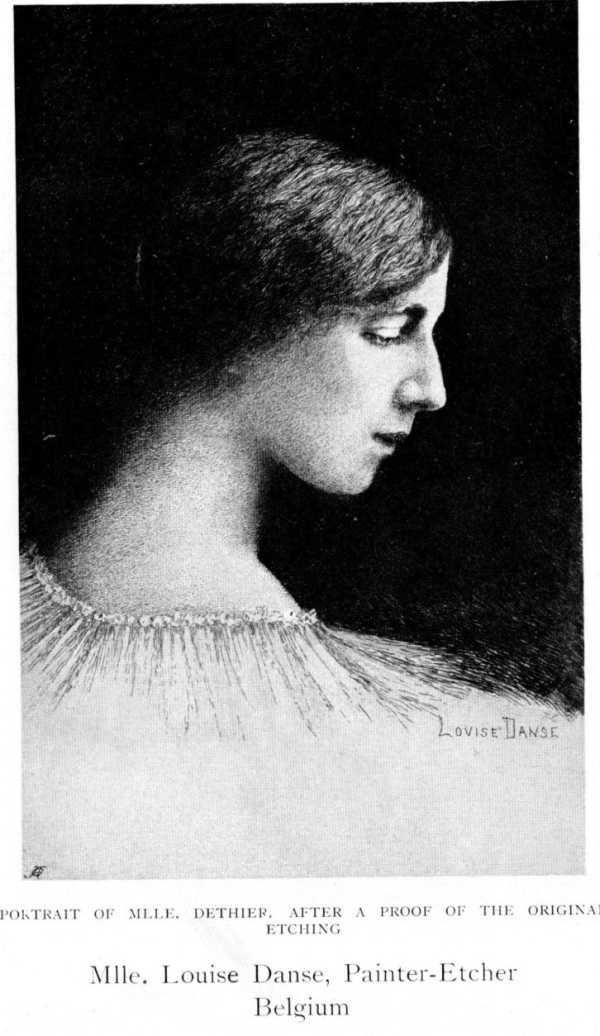
- Born: 2 April 1867; Saint-Gilles, Belgium
- Died: 25 May 1948 (aged 81); Saint-Gilles
- Known for: Painting, etching
- Spouse: Robert Sand

Louise Danse (1867 – 1948) was a Belgian painter.

== Life and work ==
She was the daughter of the engraver Auguste Danse who was her first teacher. Her sister Marie Danse was also a painter. Her mother was the sister of the painter Constantin Meunier. Louise was a painter but is better known for her etchings, which were published by her husband, the publisher Robert Sand (1876-1936).

Her etching Portrait of Mlle. Dethier, was included in the 1905 book Women Painters of the World.

She became a founding member of the Brussels graphic artist collective L’Estampe in 1906, along with her sister Marie and her husband, who became the group's secretary.

== Gallery ==
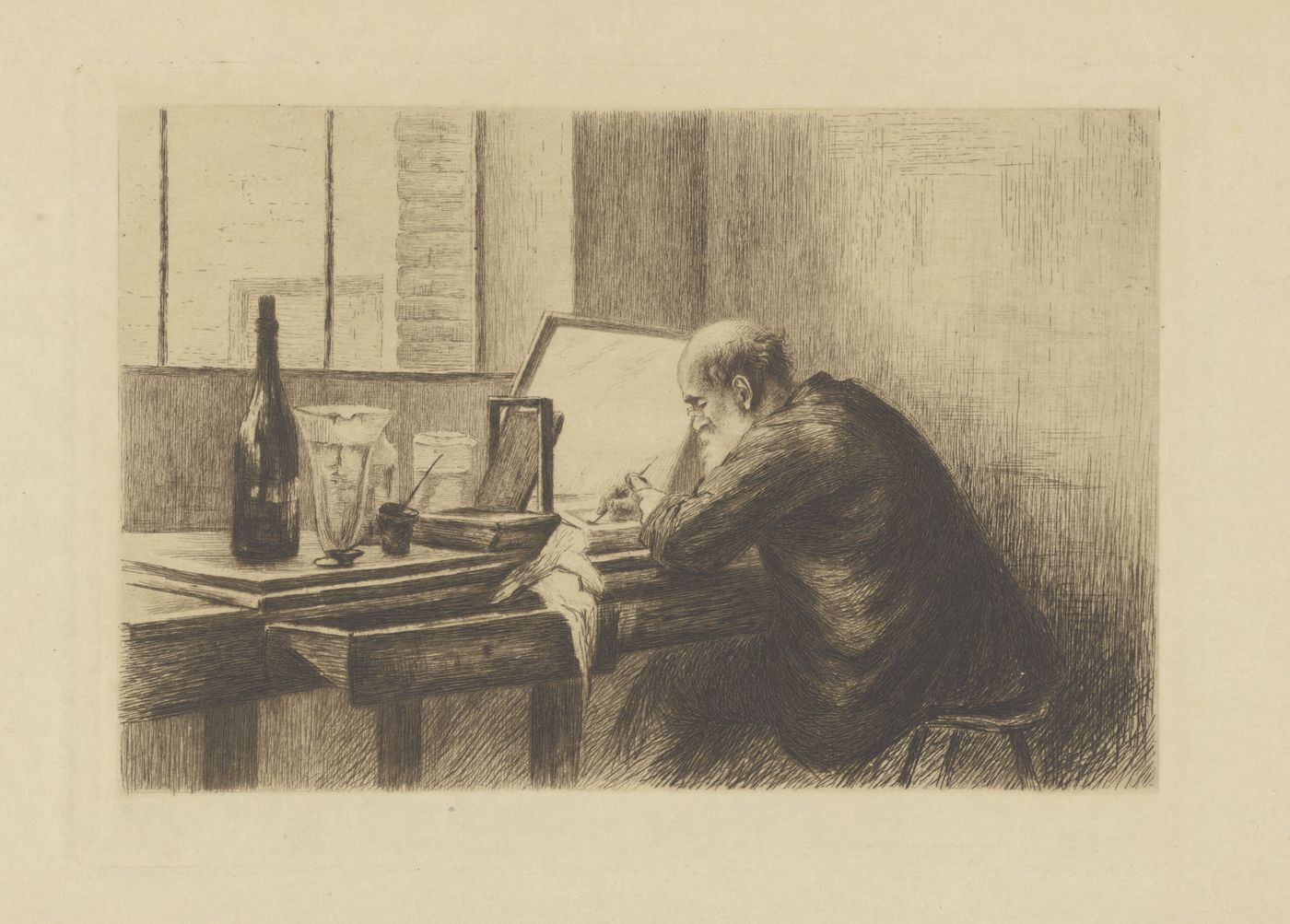
Louise Danse, Portrait d'Auguste Danse, Royal Library of Belgium

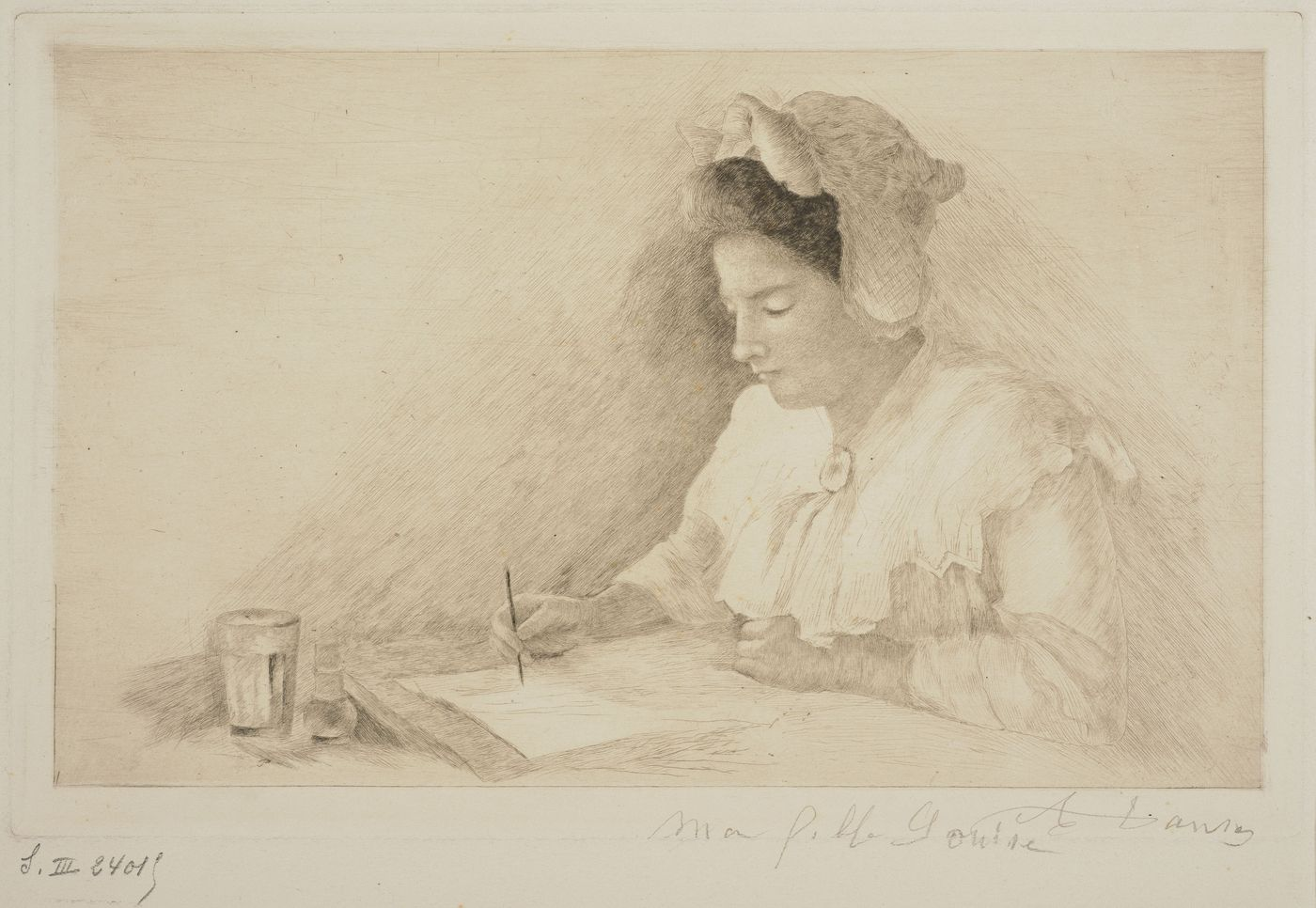
Louise Danse, Jeune fille dessinant, Royal Library of Belgium

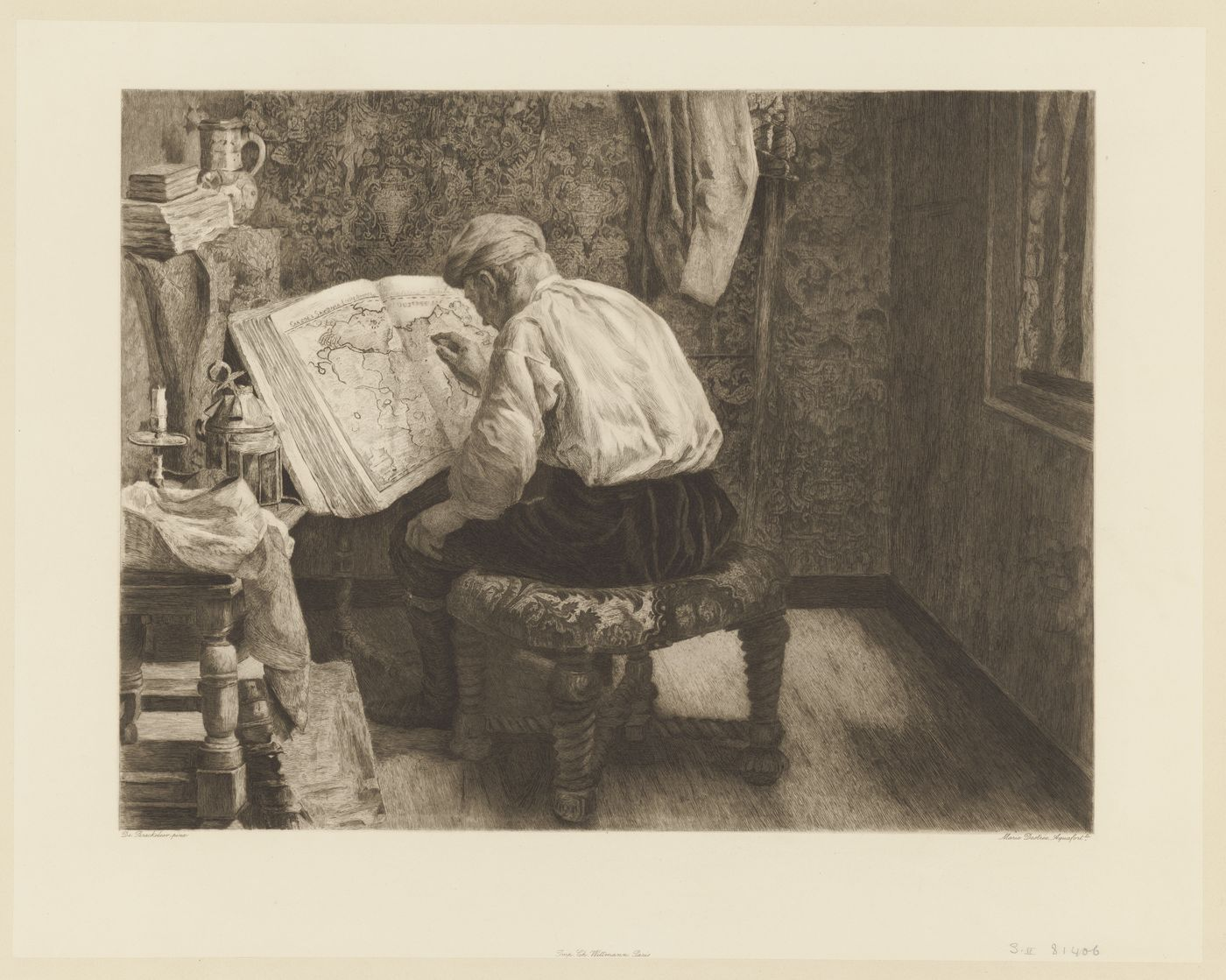
Louise Danse, Le géographe, Royal Library of Belgium

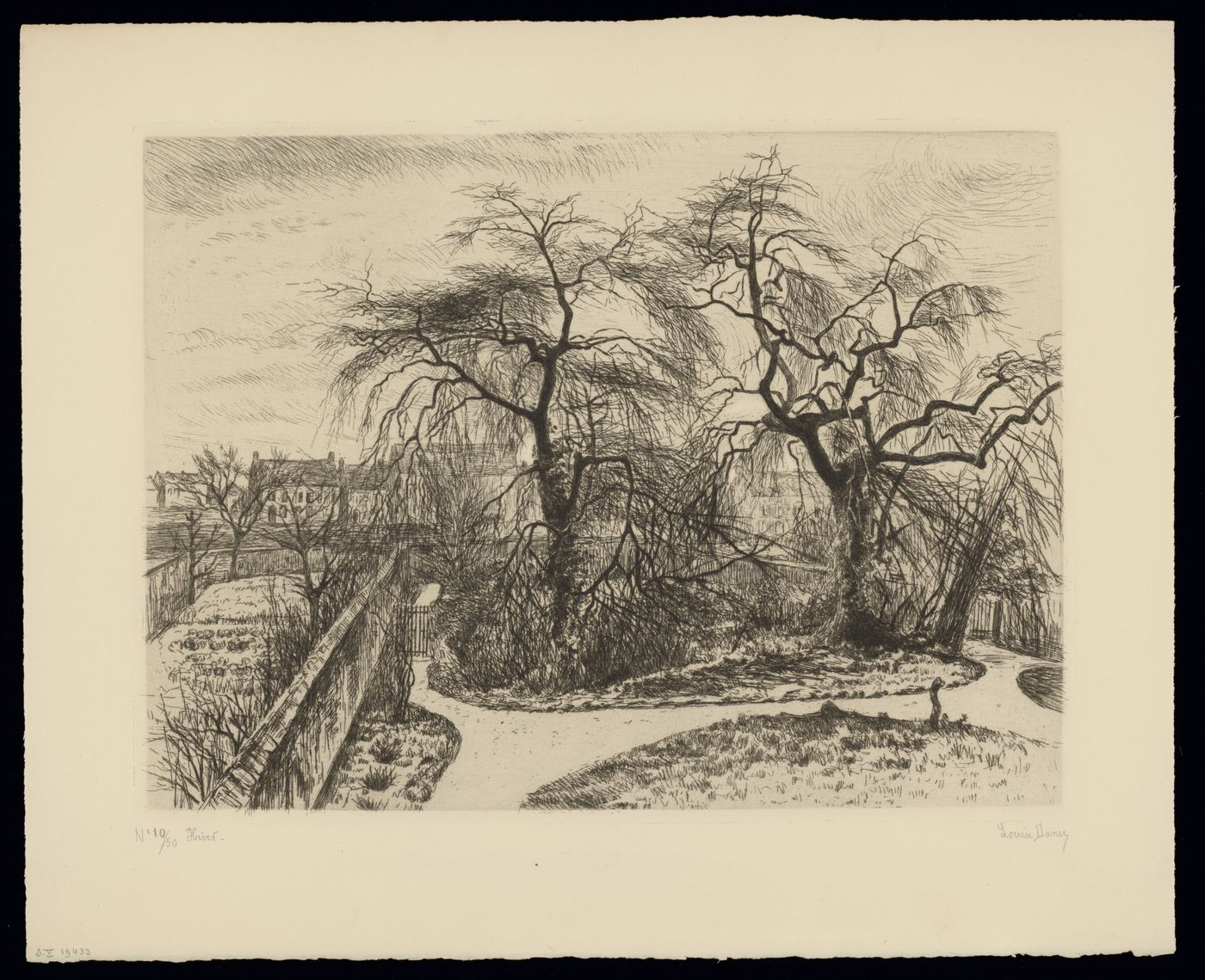
Louise Danse, Hiver (Jardin), Royal Library of Belgium

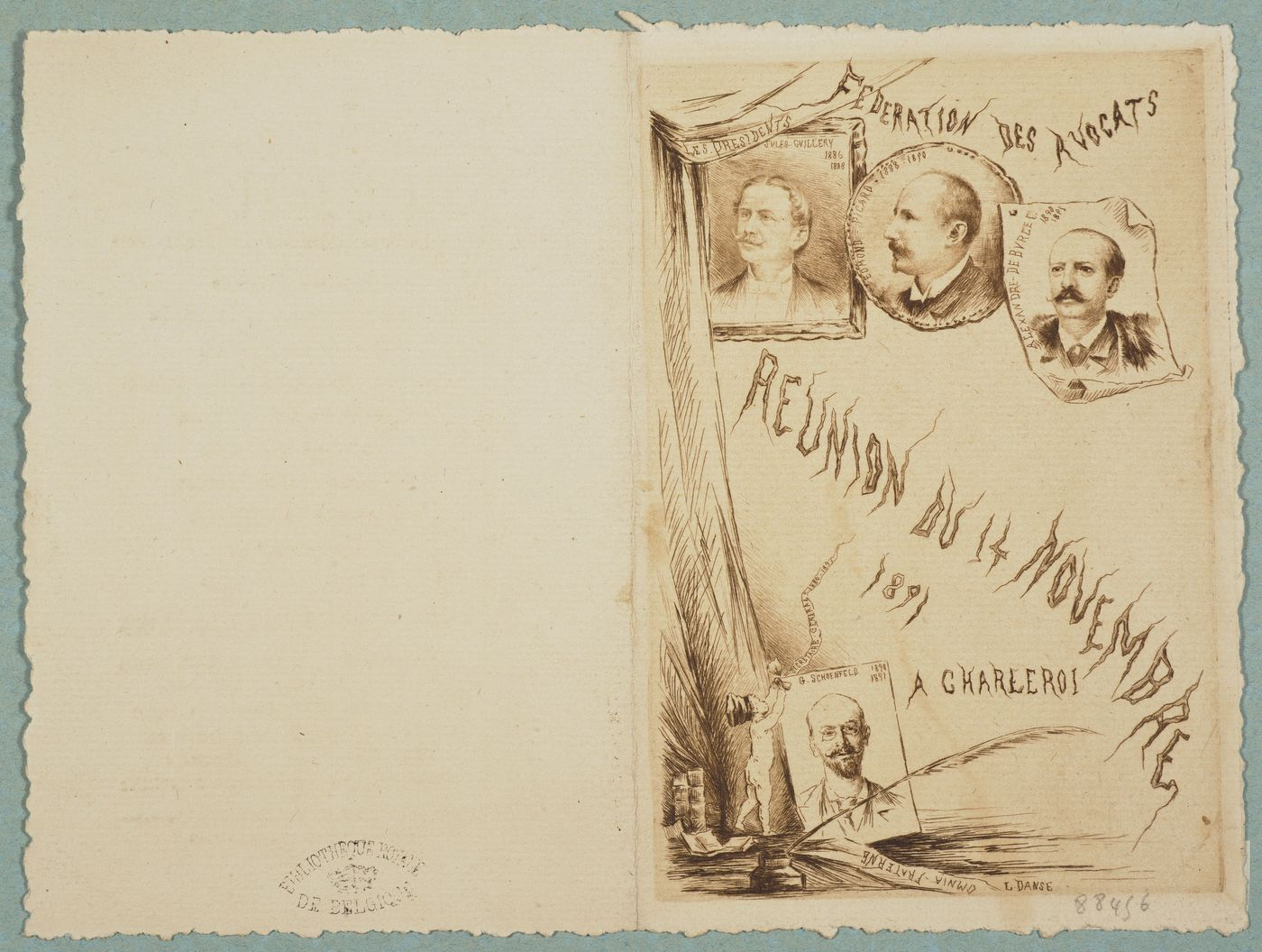
Louise Danse, Sans titre, Royal Library of Belgium

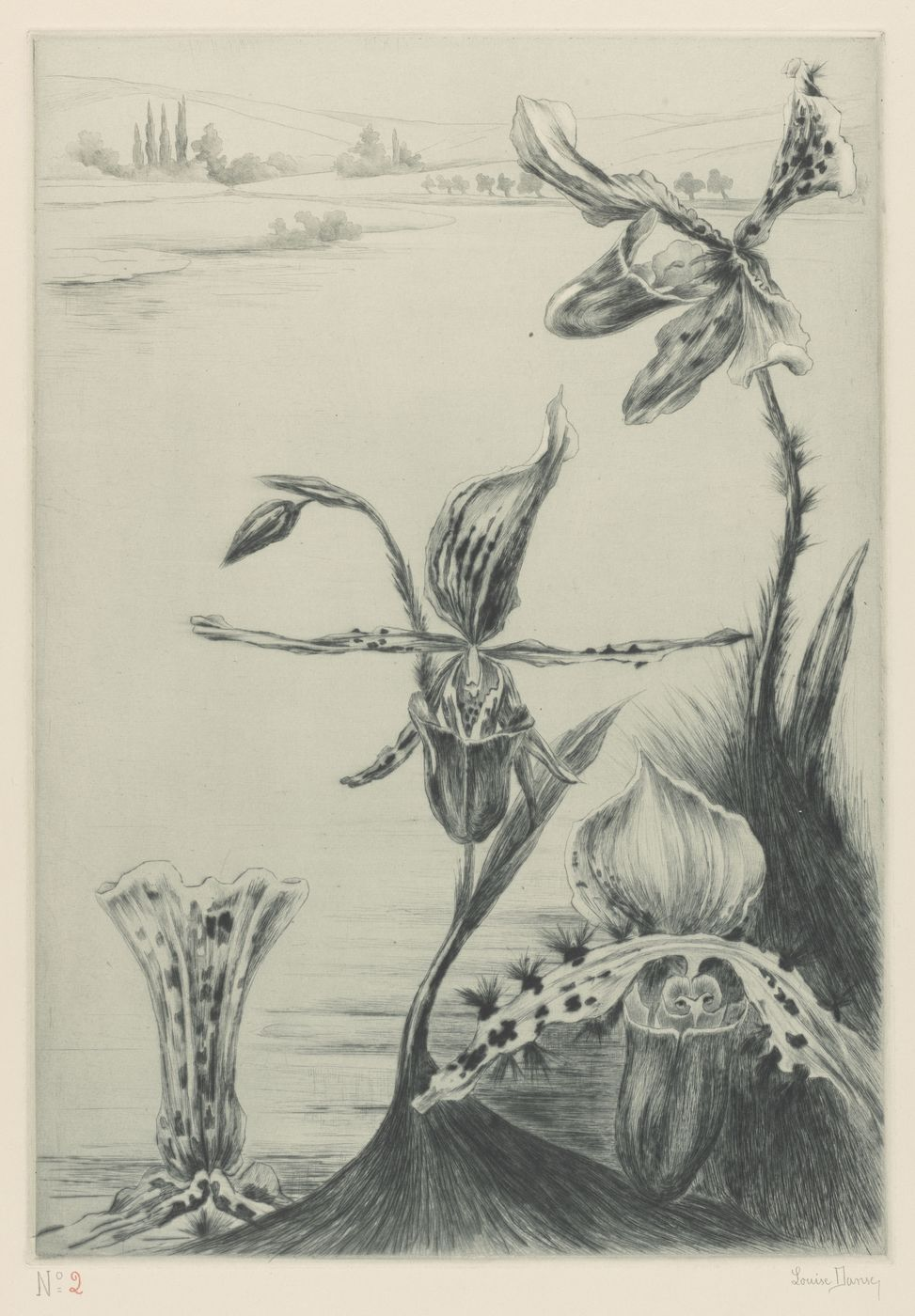
Louise Danse, Iris, Royal Library of Belgium

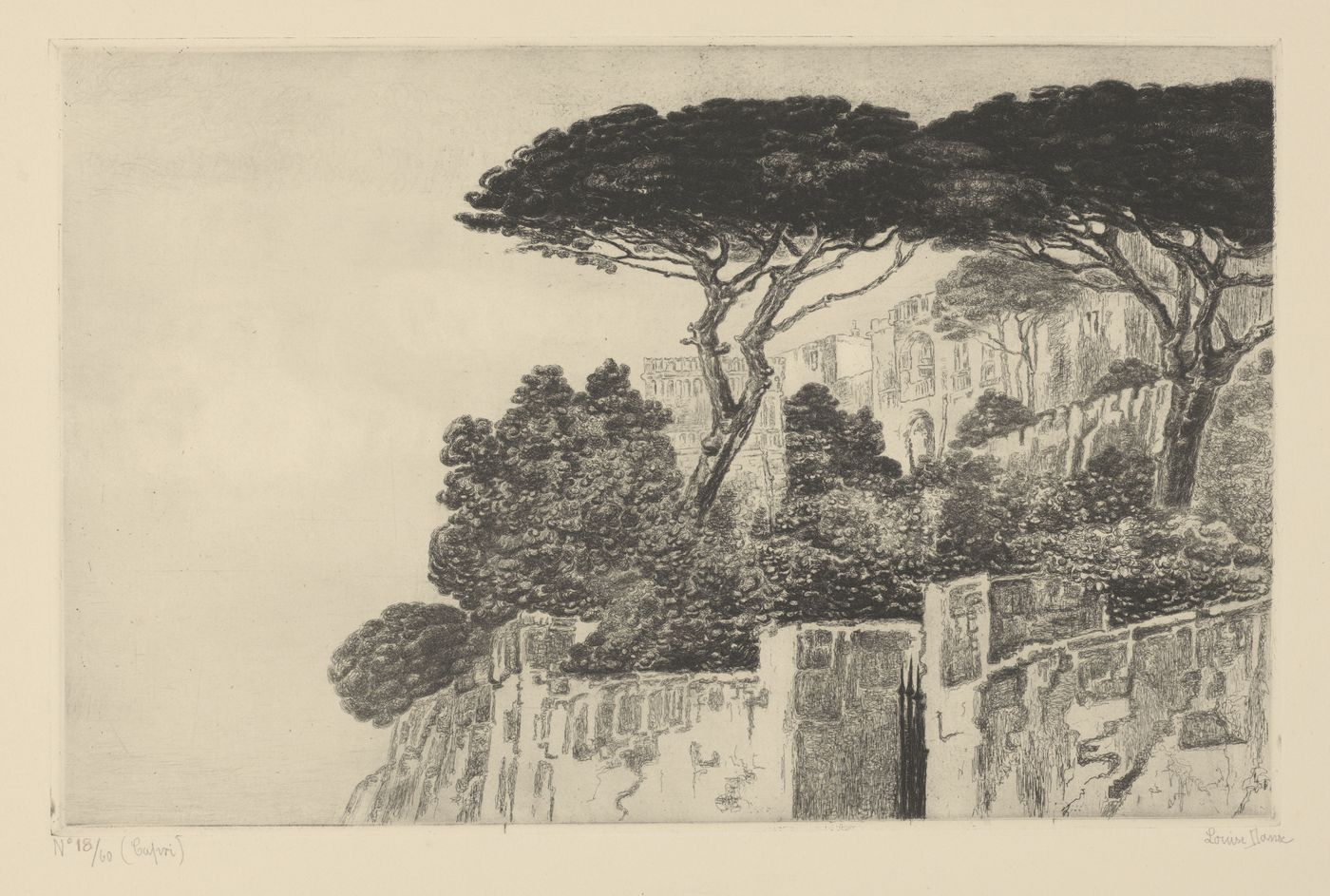
Louise Danse, Capri (Villa de Tibère), Royal Library of Belgium

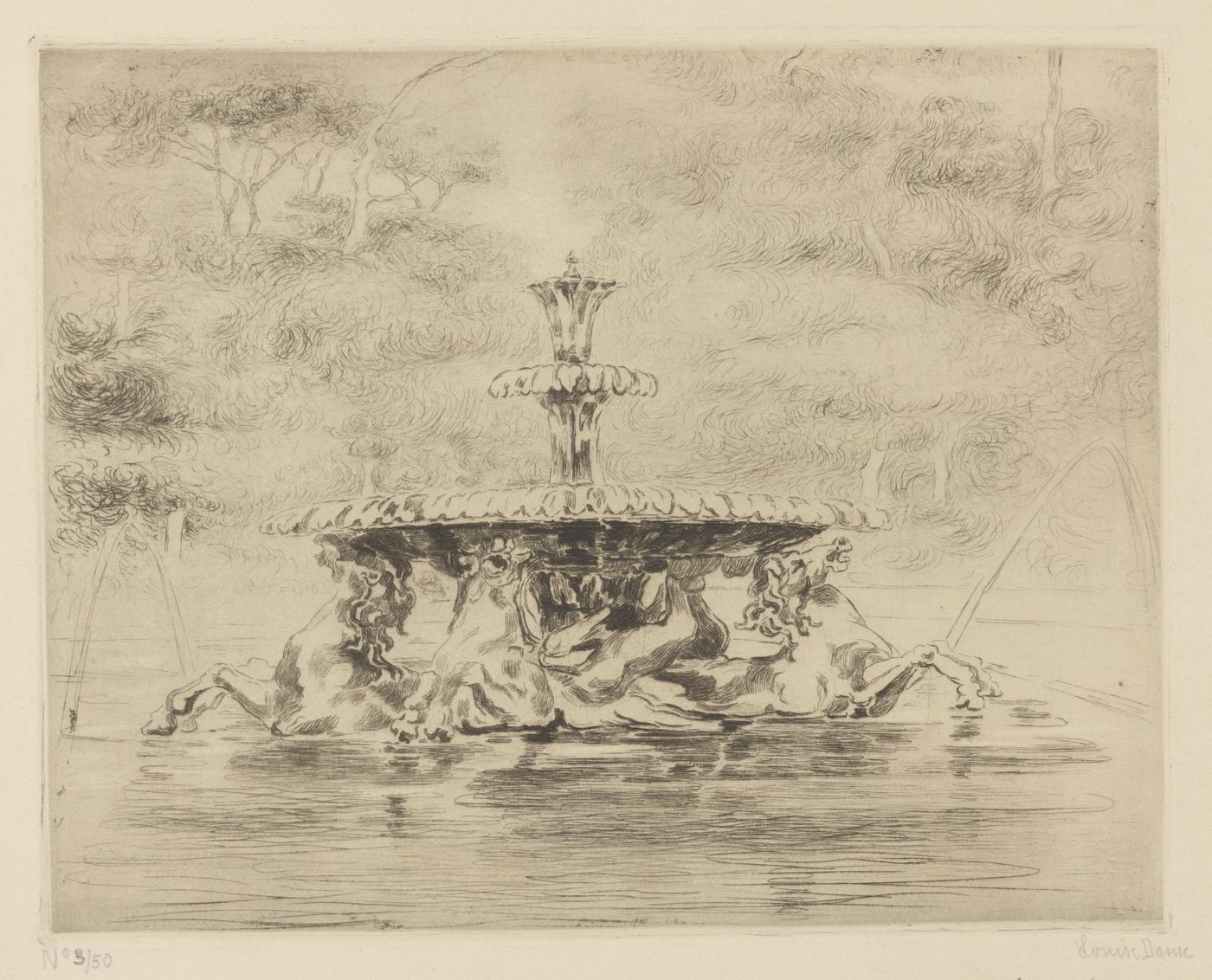
Louise Danse, La fontaine des jardins Borghèse, Royal Library of Belgium

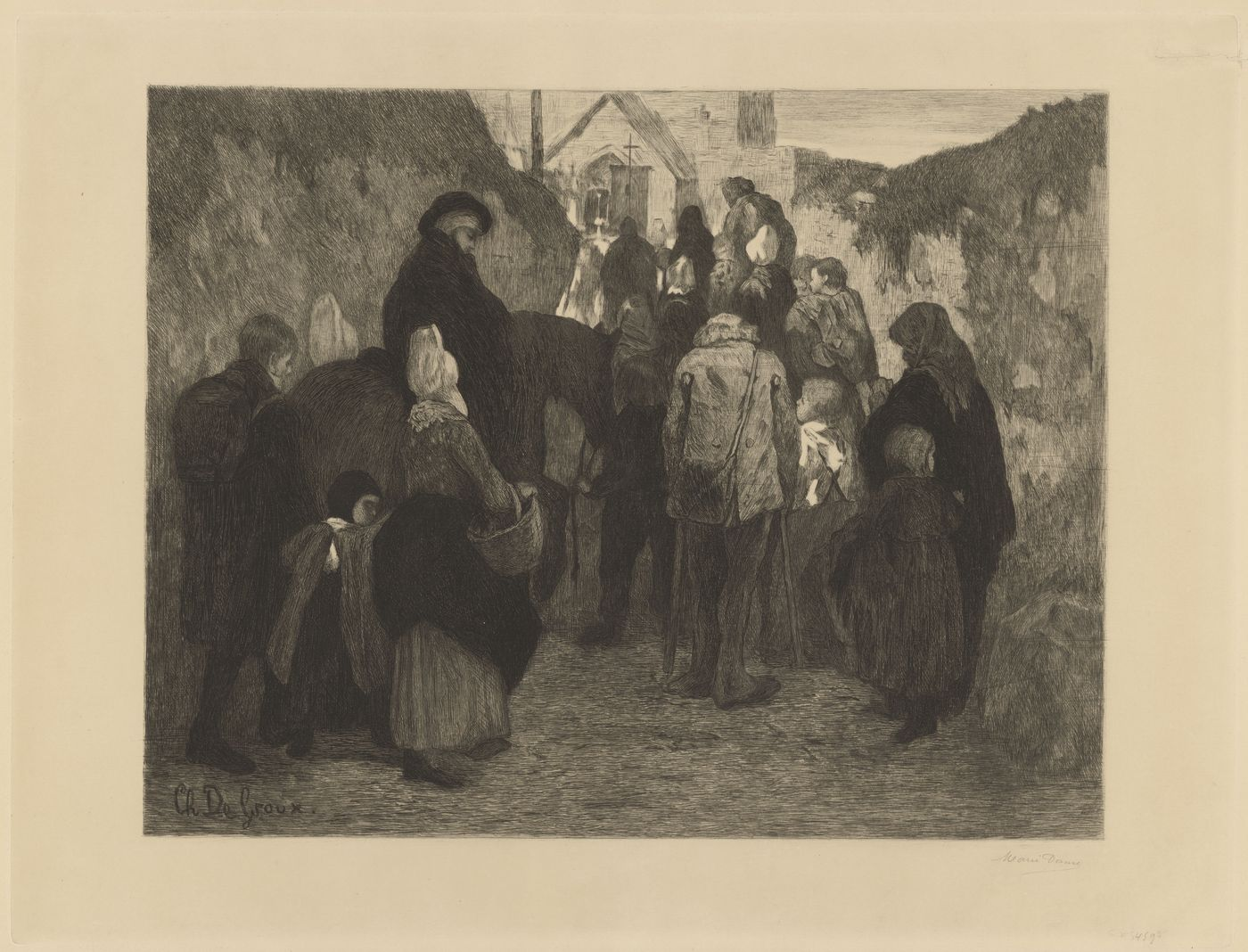
Louise Danse, Un pélerinage, Royal Library of Belgium

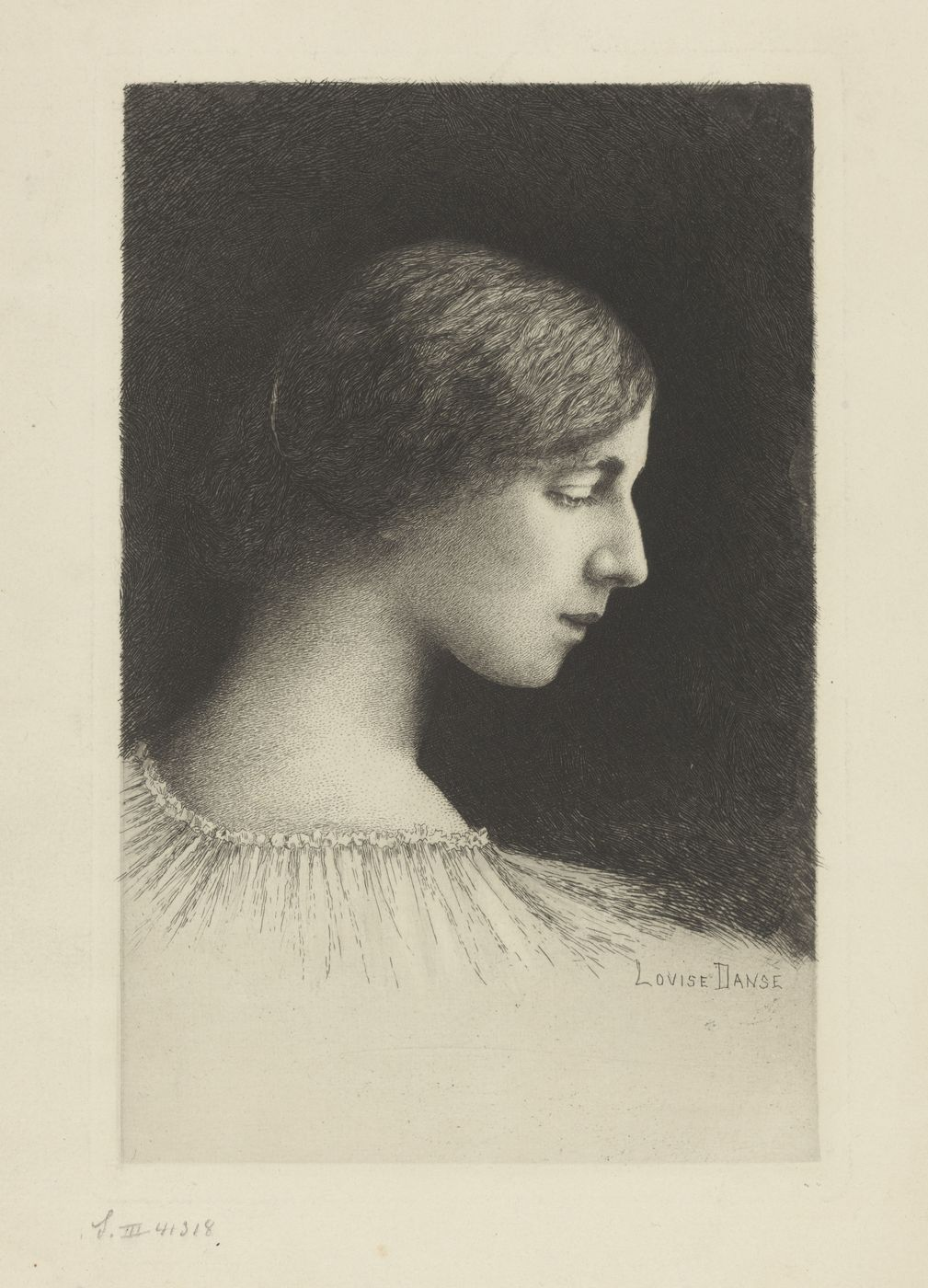
Louise Danse, Portrait de Melle H. Dethier, Royal Library of Belgium

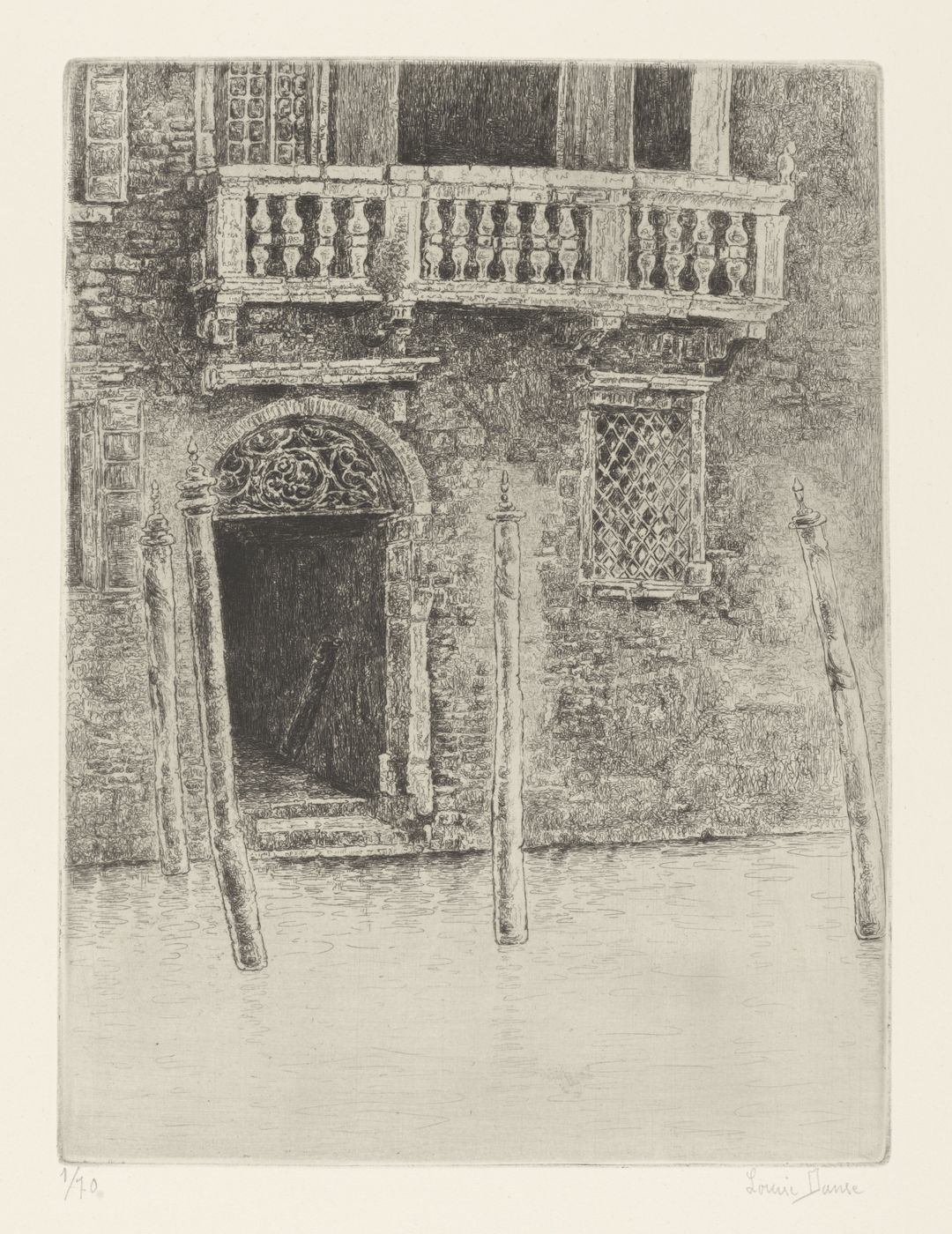
Louise Danse, Rio di Sant'Angelo, Royal Library of Belgium

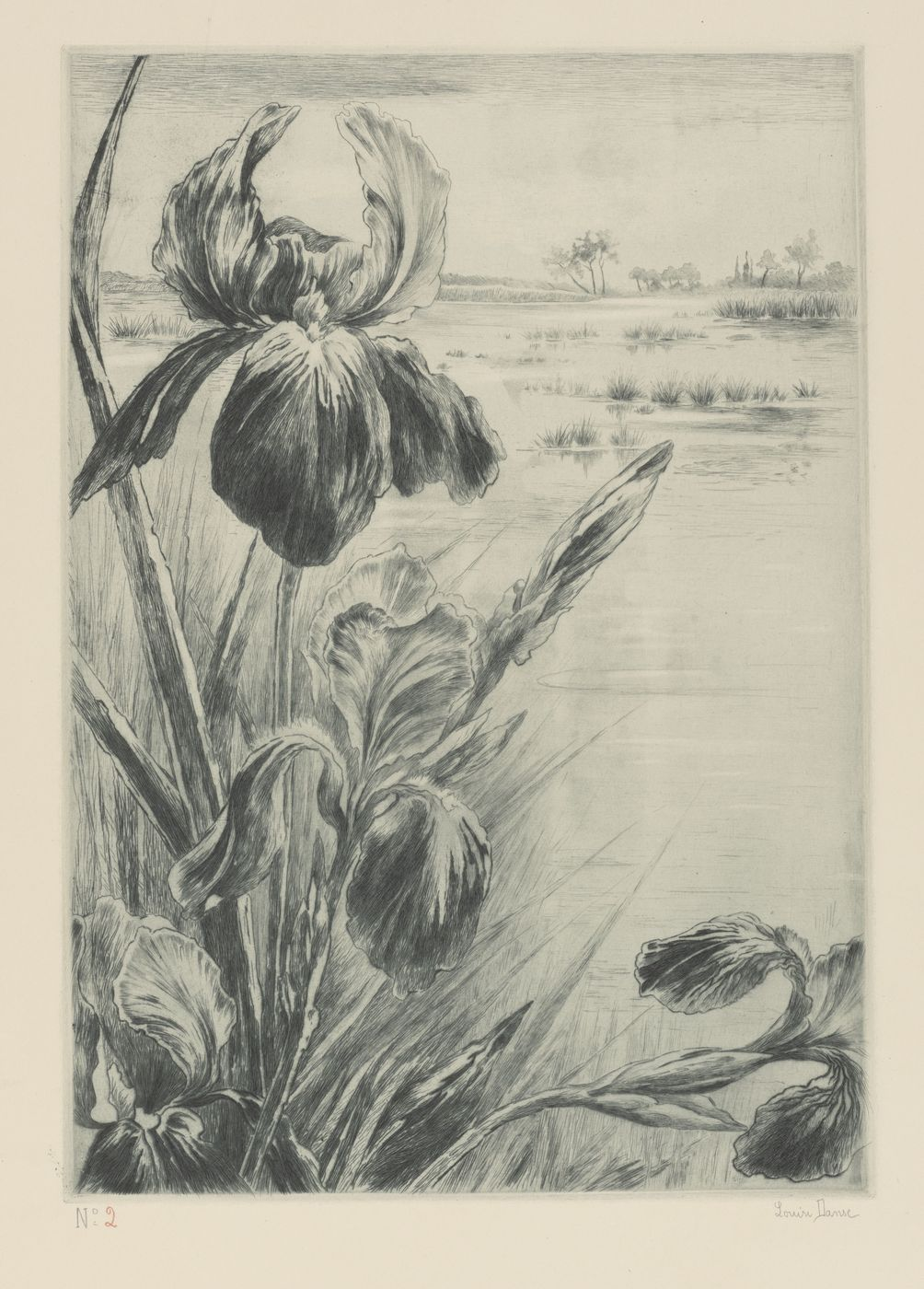
Louise Danse, Orchidées, Royal Library of Belgium

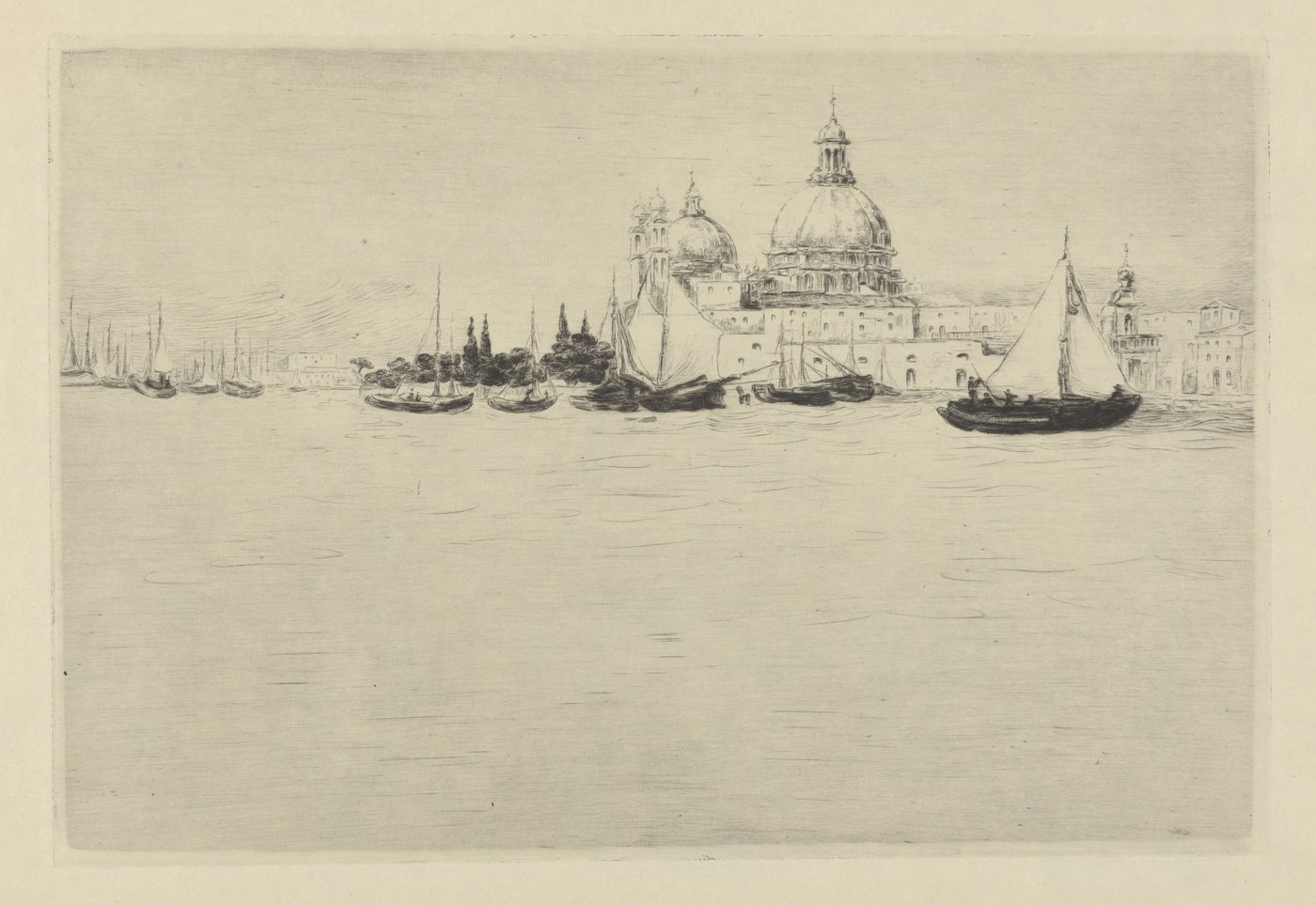
Louise Danse, Santa Maria, Royal Library of Belgium

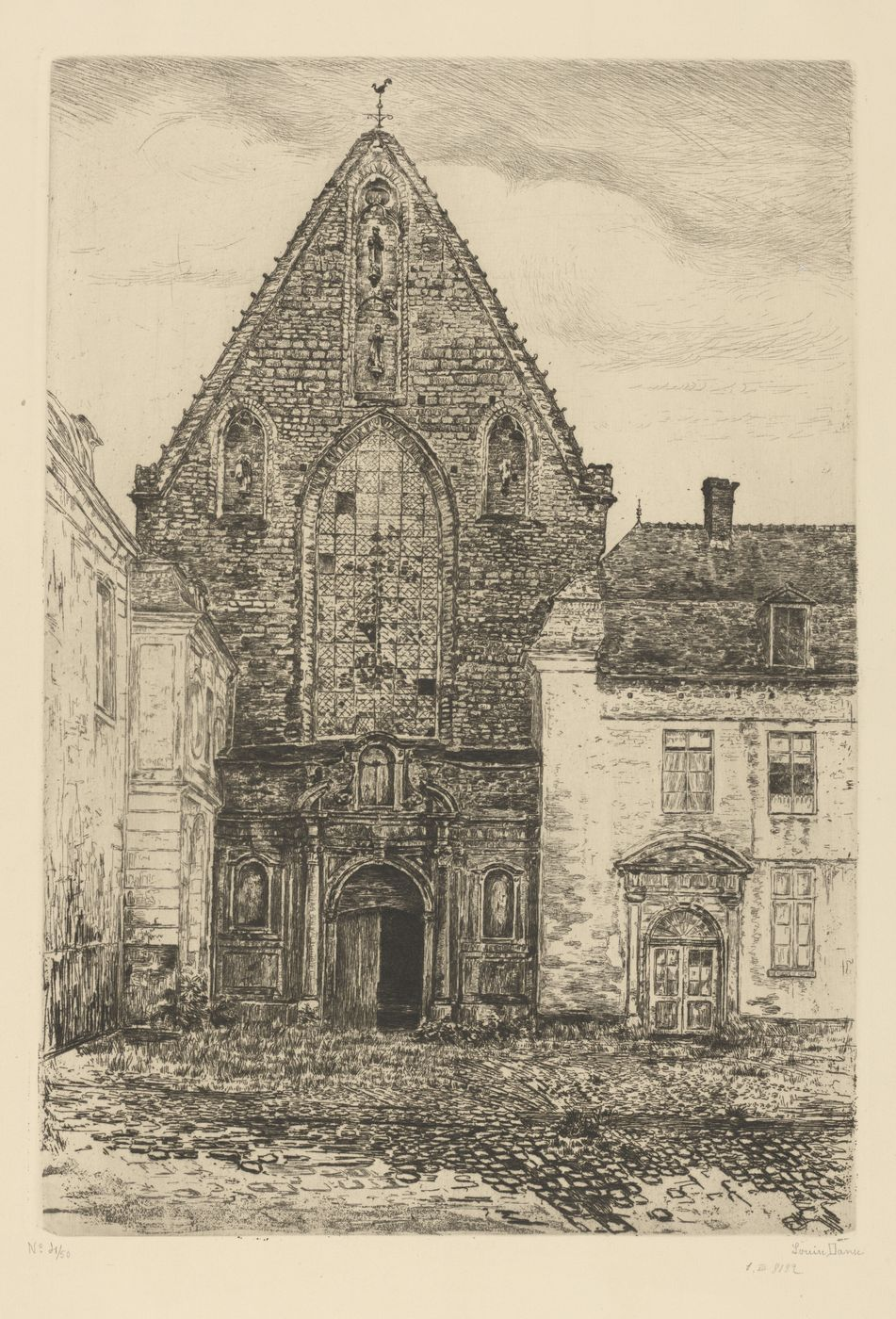
Louise Danse, L'abbaye de la Cambre, Royal Library of Belgium

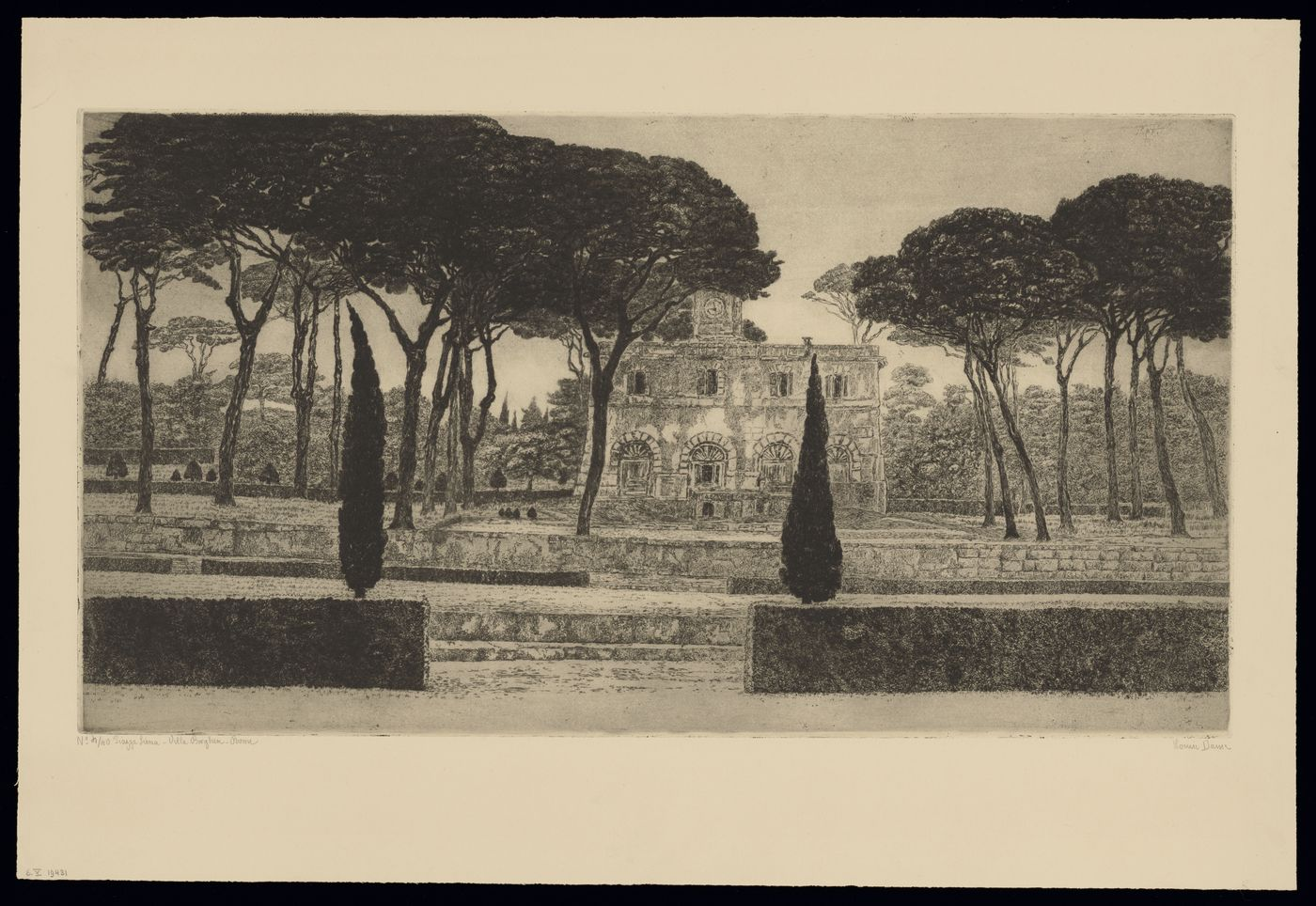
Louise Danse, Piazza Siena, Villa Borghèse, Rome, Royal Library of Belgium

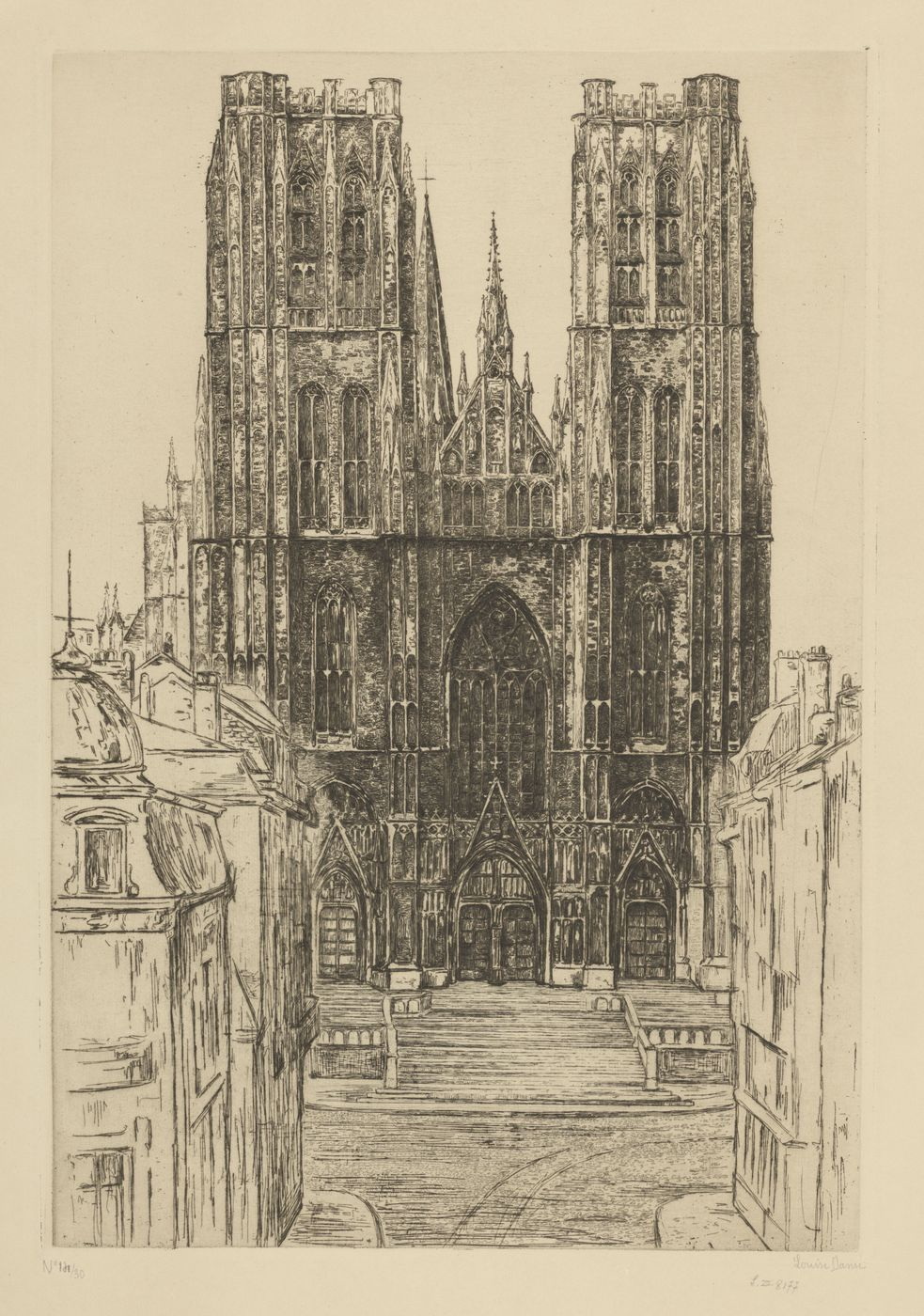
Louise Danse, Eglise Sainte Gudule à Bruxelles, Royal Library of Belgium

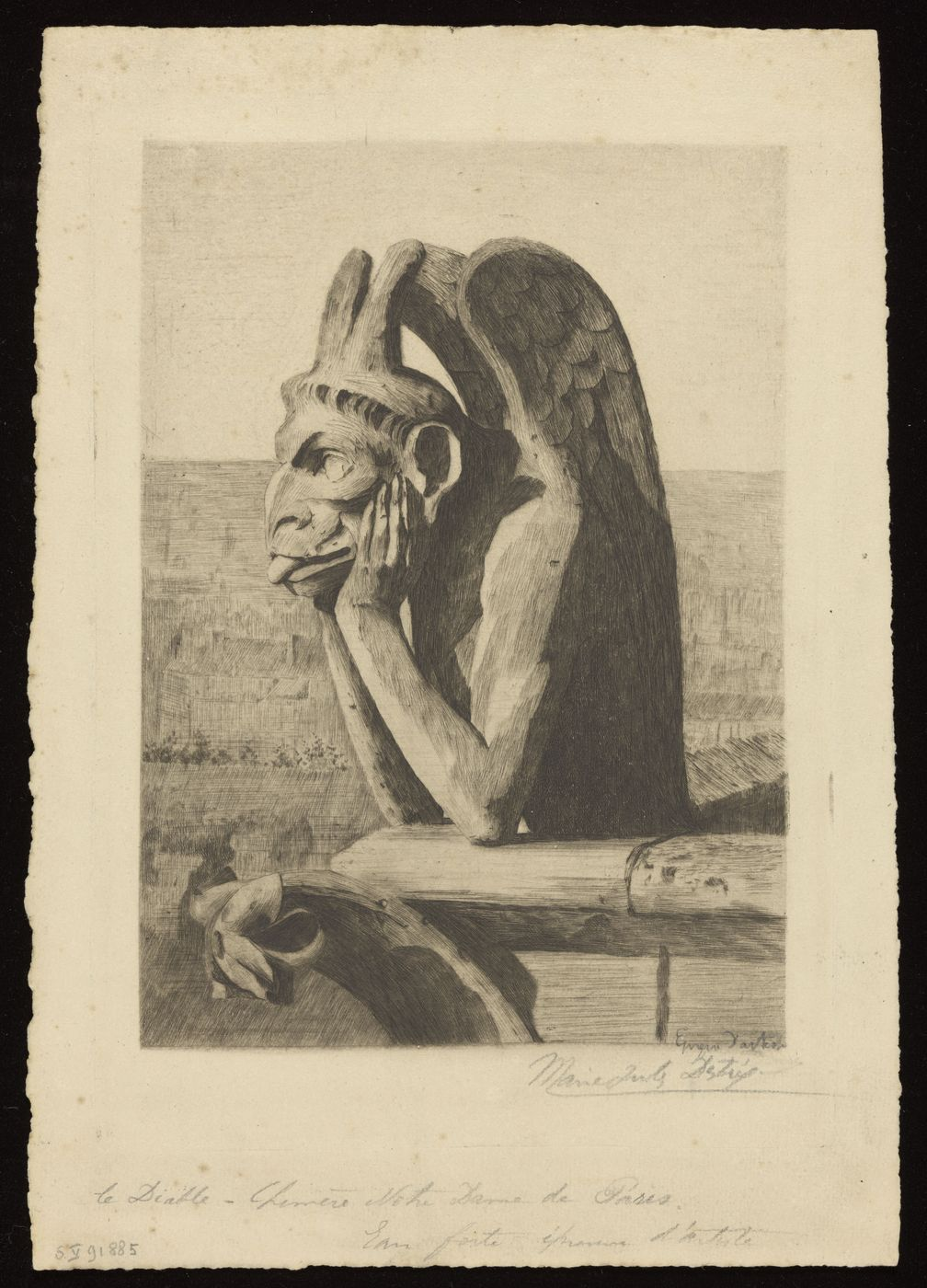
Louise Danse, Le diable; chimères de Notre-Dame de Paris, Royal Library of Belgium

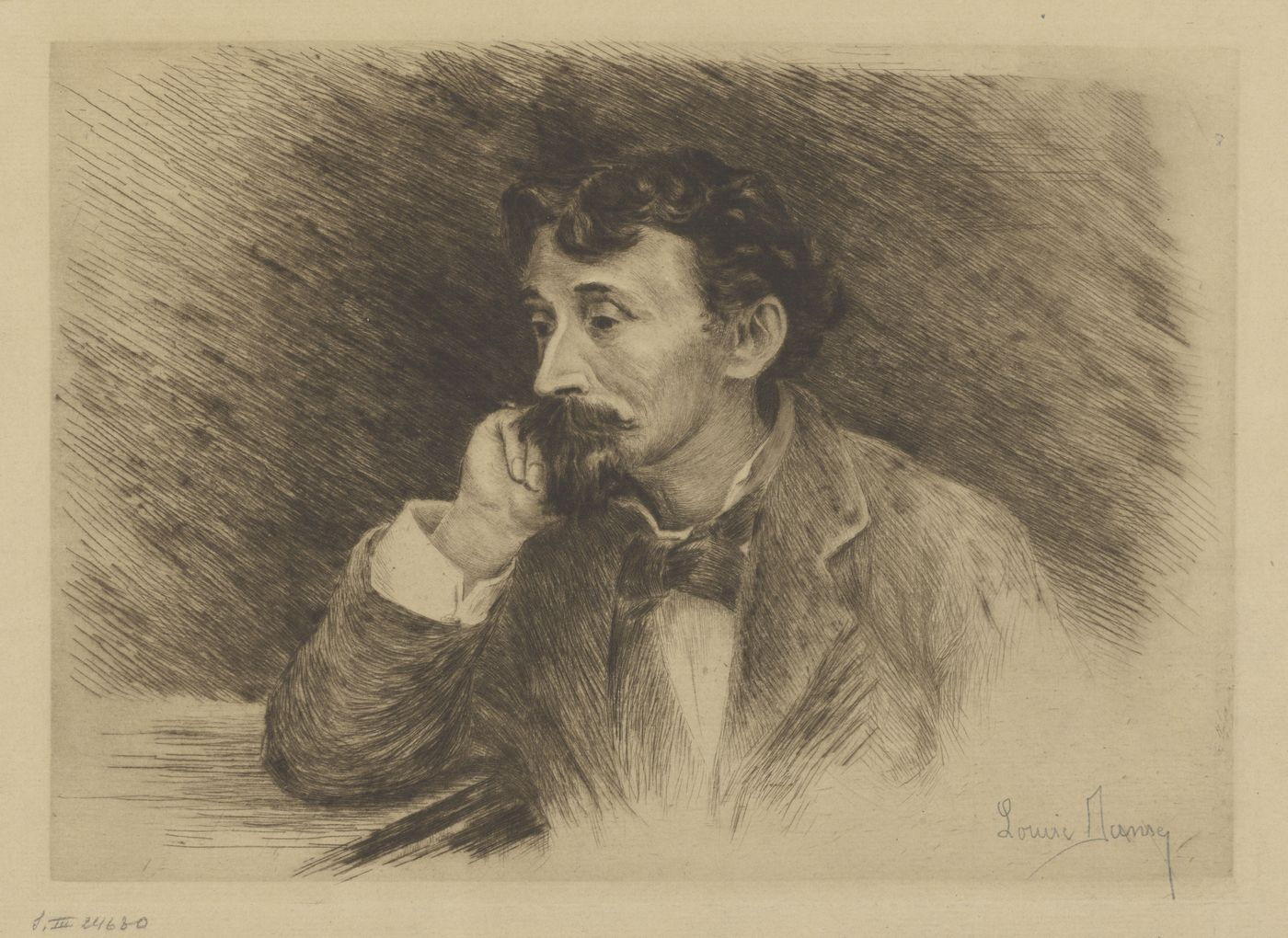
Louise Danse, Portrait de Louise Artan, peintre (1837-1890), Royal Library of Belgium

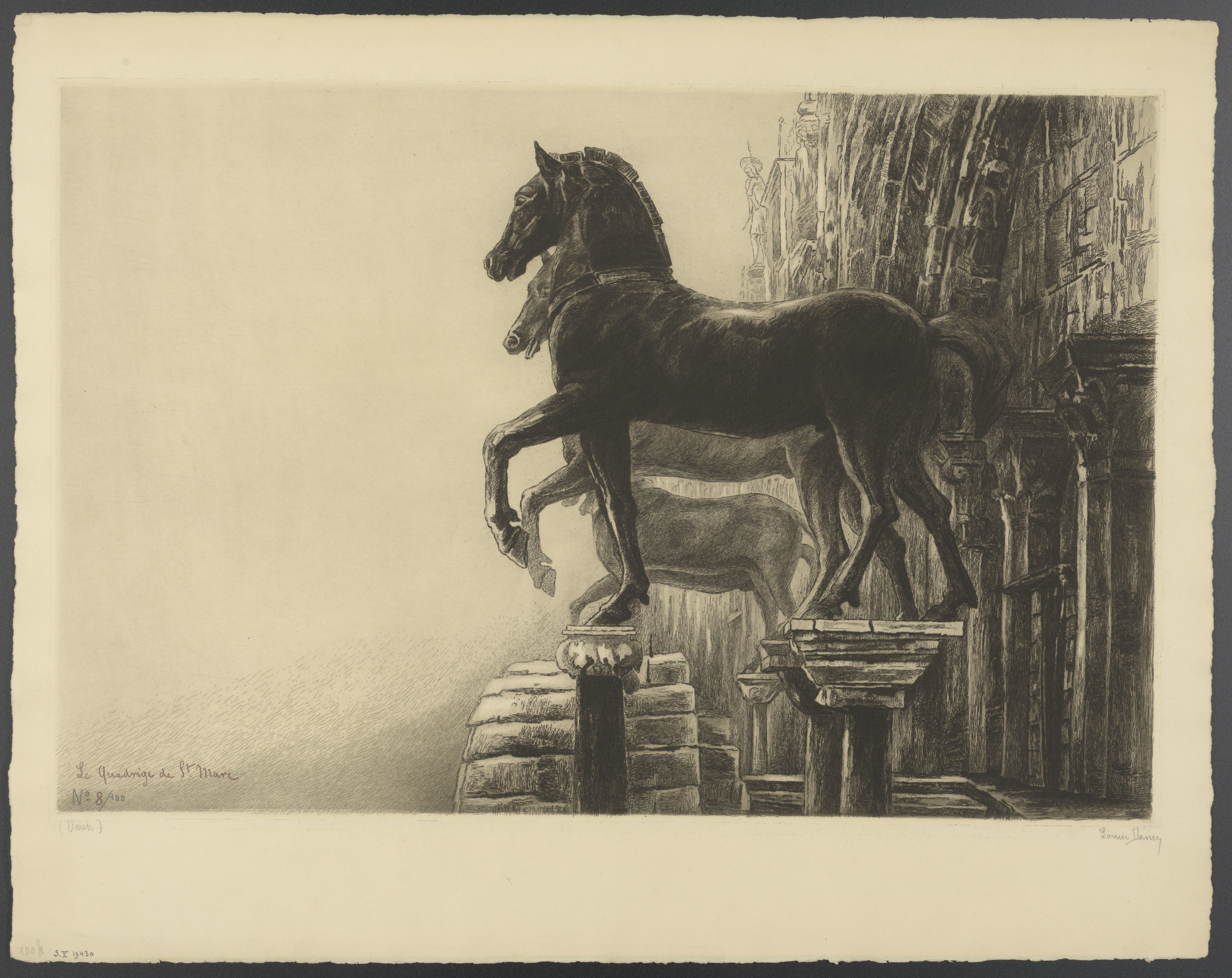
Louise Danse, Le quadrige de Saint Marc, à Venise, Royal Library of Belgium

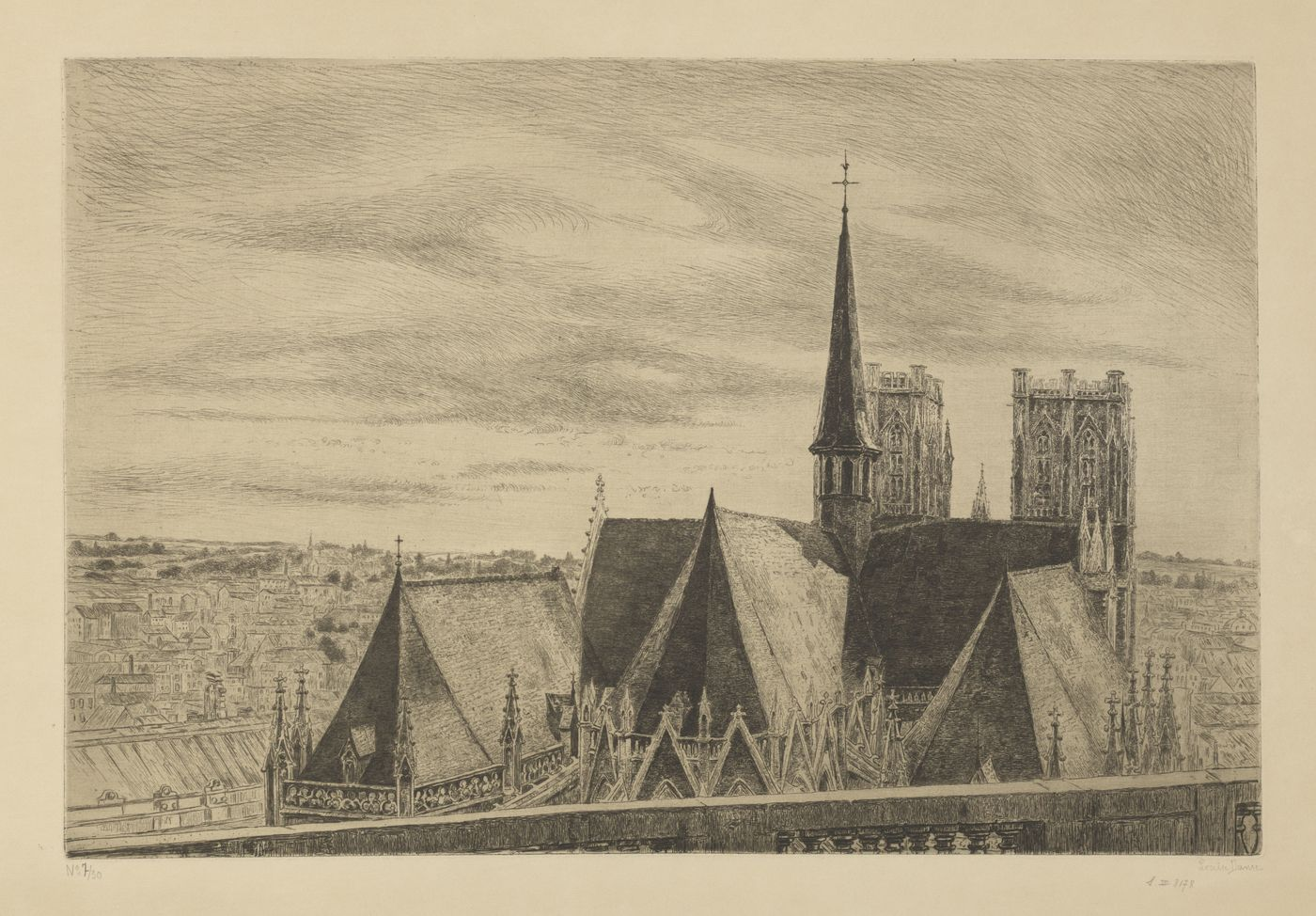
Louise Danse, Les toits de l'église Sainte Gudule à Bruxelles, Royal Library of Belgium

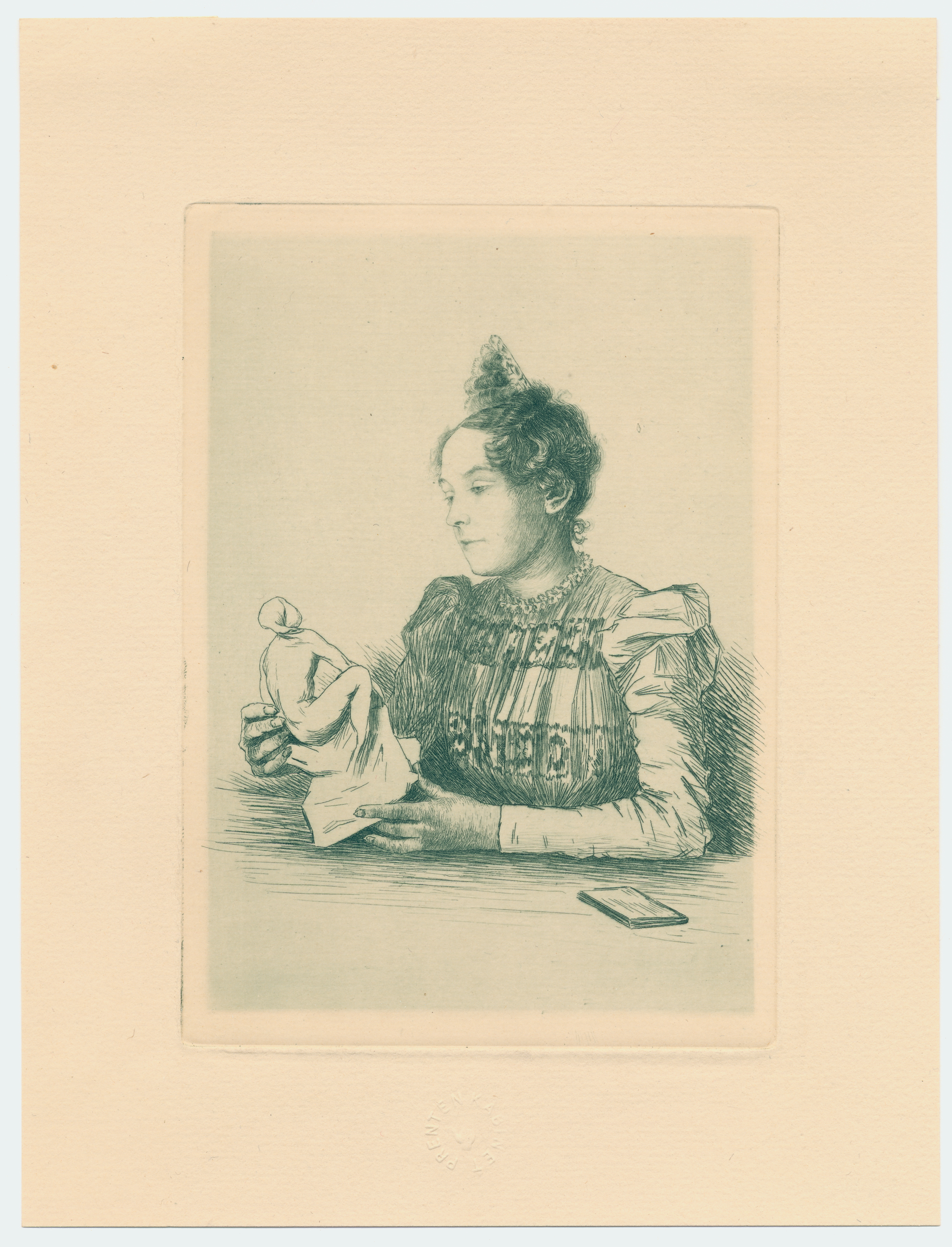
Louise Danse, Portrait d'une femme, Plantin-Moretus Museum, Antwerp

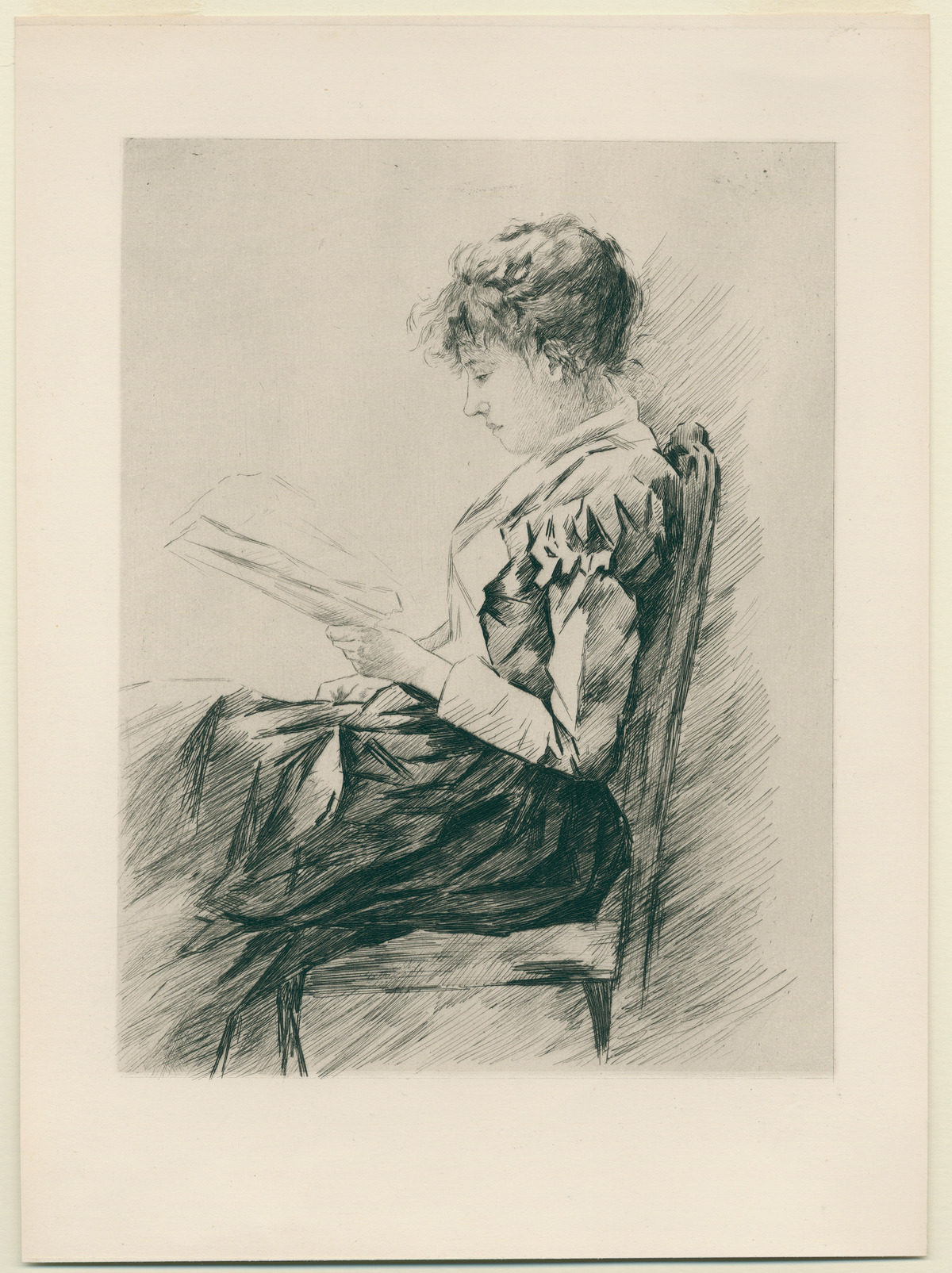
Louise Danse, Femme lisant, Plantin-Moretus Museum, Antwerp

== Bibliography ==
- Piette, Valérie; Rassart-Debergh, Marguerite (2006). "Danse, Louise". In Gubin, Éliane (ed.). Dictionnaire des femmes belges: XIXe et XXe siècles [Dictionary of Belgian women: nineteenth and twentieth centuries] (in French). Brussels: Éditions Racine. pp. 133–134. ISBN 2-87386-434-6.
