= Berthe Art =

Belgian painter (1857–1934)

Berthe Constance Ursule Art
- Born: 26 December 1857; Brussels, Belgium
- Died: 27 February 1934 (aged 76); Saint-Gilles, Belgium
- Known for: Still life painting

Berthe Constance Ursule Art (26 December 1857 – 27 February 1934) was a Belgian still life painter.

== Biography ==
She was born in Brussels as the daughter of Ferdinand Art and Constance Luc. She never married and lived and worked on 28 Blanchestraat in Sint-Gillis (Brussels). she was trained by Alfred Stevens and advised by Franz Binjé. Her painting Study of Still life: Grapes and Partridges was included in the 1905 book Women Painters of the World. Berthe Art exhibited her work at the Palace of Fine Arts and The Woman's Building at the 1893 World's Columbian Exposition in Chicago, Illinois.

Her paintings are sometimes referred as accessory still lifes as they widely involved representations of antiques, biblots and knick-knacks. Berthe Art would also give drawing and painting lessons to upper class girls. The painter Jeanne Maquet-Tombu was one of her pupils. She also gave a shelter to Roger Parent, the French painter who made a famous portrait of her.

== Circle of Women Painters ==
She became a member of the Brussels-based club called Cercle des Femmes Peintres which was active 1888–1893. They were the Belgian equivalent of the French Union des Femmes Peintres et Sculpteurs. Other members were Jeanne Adrighetti, Alix d'Anethan, Marie de Bièvre, Marguérite Dielman, Mathilde Dupré-Lesprit, Mary Gasparioli, Marie Heijermans, Pauline Jamar, Rosa Leigh, Alice Ronner, Henriëtte Ronner-Knip, Rosa Venneman, Marguerite Verboeckhoven, Emma Verwee and Marie de Villermont. They organized art shows in the local Brussels museum from 1888 but were disbanded by 1902.

== Galerie Lyceum ==
She began a Brussels gallery in 1911 together with some friends from the (by then defunct) Circle of Women Painters. The gallery was called the Galerie Lyceum. Founding members were Alice Ronner, Emma Ronner, Anna Boch, Louise Danse, Marie Danse, Juliette Wytsman and Ketty Gilsoul-Hoppe.

== Gallery ==
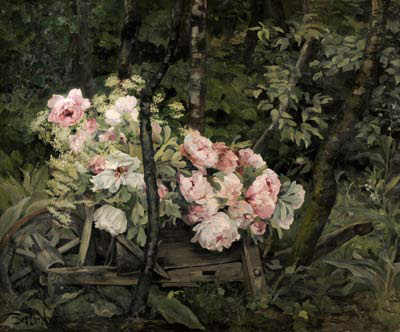
The Floral Wheelbarrow

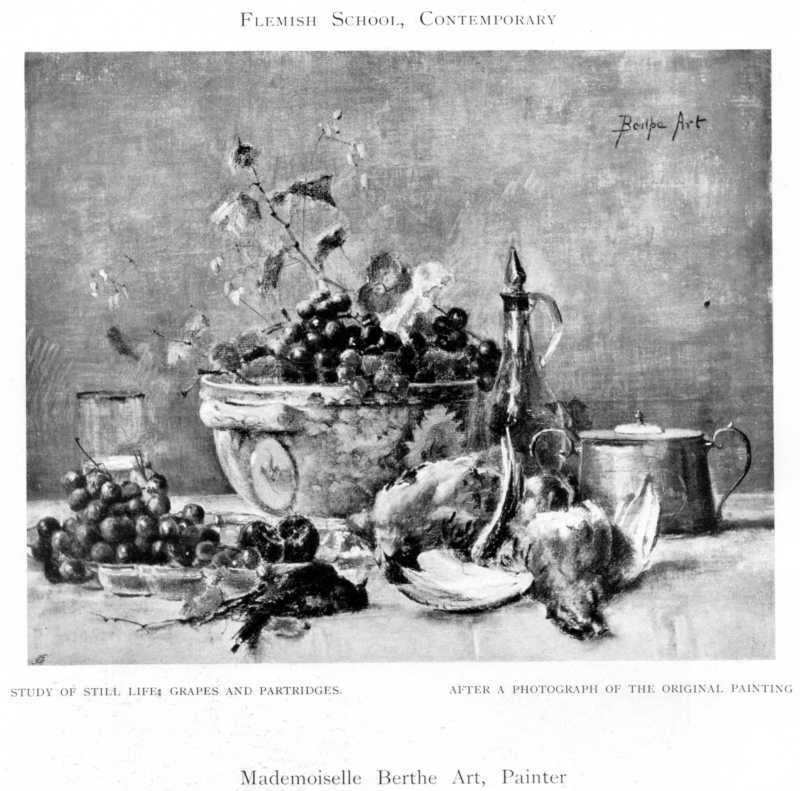
Still Life of Grapes and Partridges

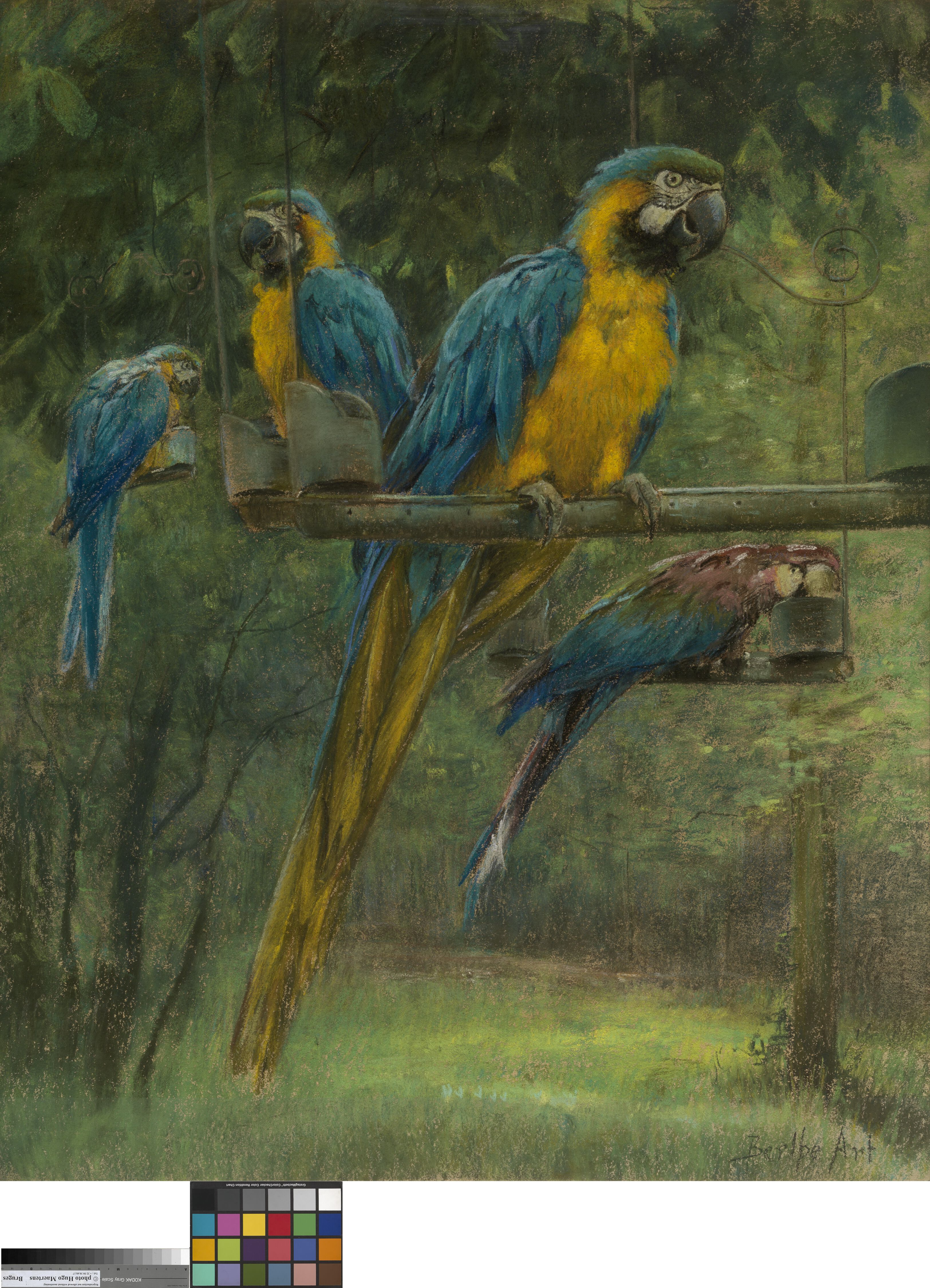
Blue Macaws Royal Museum of Fine Arts Antwerp
