= Marguerite Verboeckhoven =

Belgian painter

- Born: 14 July 1865; Schaerbeek
- Died: 8 August 1949 (aged 84); Ixelles
- Occupation: Painter

Marguerite Verboeckhoven (14 July 1865 – 8 August 1949) was a Belgian painter known for her seascapes.

== Life ==
Verboeckhoven was born in Schaerbeek in 1865. She was the daughter of the publisher Louis-Hippolyte Verboeckhoven and Rosalie-Françoise Pierard, and the granddaughter of the animal painter Eugène Verboeckhoven and great-granddaughter of the sculptor Barthélémy Verboeckhoven.

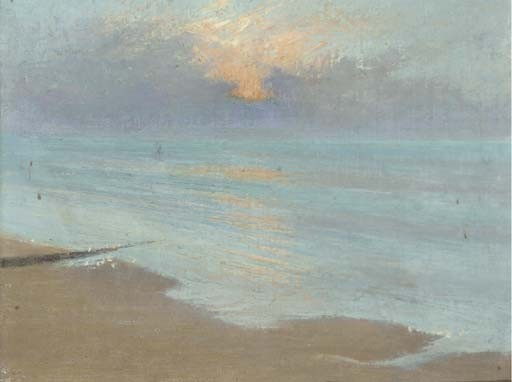
Marguerite Verboeckhoven Coastal landscape

She was educated in a wealthy and cultural environment. She received her artistic education at Ernest Blanc-Garin, who had specially opened a workshop for women and girls. Afterwards she became a teacher at the Ernest Blanc-Garin's workshop. She met artists such as Edwin Ganz, Lucien Wollès and Henri Evenepoel there . She specialised in trying to capture the subtle variations of colour seen at the sea shore.

Like many artists including Ernest Blanc-Garin, she lived in Knocke in the 1880s and 1890s.

In 1888, she was co-founder of the Cercle des Femmes Peintres in Brussels. Other members were Berthe Art, Marie De Bièvre, Marguerite Dielman, Marie Heijermans, Alice Ronner, Rosa Venneman and Emma Verwée. She organized four exhibitions for the artists circle in 1888, 1890, 1891 and 1893 .

She lived in Brussels, rue de Robiano 28, rue Vifquin 41, and later chaussée de Wavre 249. She exhibited 40 paintings in Brussels in 1940.

Verboeckhoven died in Ixelles in 1949.

Her painting "Coastal Landscape" sold for over $1000 in 2005.
