= Sárika Góth =

Dutch artist

- self portrait, 1923
- Born: Charlotte Góth; 29 March 1900; Vienna, Austria
- Died: 1 April 1992 (aged 92); Veere, Netherlands
- Known for: Painting

Charlotte "Sárika" Góth (1900-1992) was a Hungarian-Dutch painter.

== Biography ==
Góth was born on 29 March 1900 in Vienna, Austria to Hungarian parents. Over the course of her lifetime she lived in various parts of Europe including Paris, Budapest, Amsterdam, the Carpathian Mountains region, and Veere. Her teachers included her father, Móric Góth, Jo Koster, André Lhote, and Jan Toorop. From 1918 through 1920 she studied at the Akademie van beeldende kunsten (Royal Academy of Art, The Hague). Góth was a member of the Arti et Amicitiae, and Zeeuwse Kunstkring. Góth's work was included in the 1939 exhibition and sale Onze Kunst van Heden (Our Art of Today) at the Rijksmuseum in Amsterdam.

Góth died on 1 April 1992 in Veere.
