= Victor Gilsoul =

Belgian painter (1867–1939)

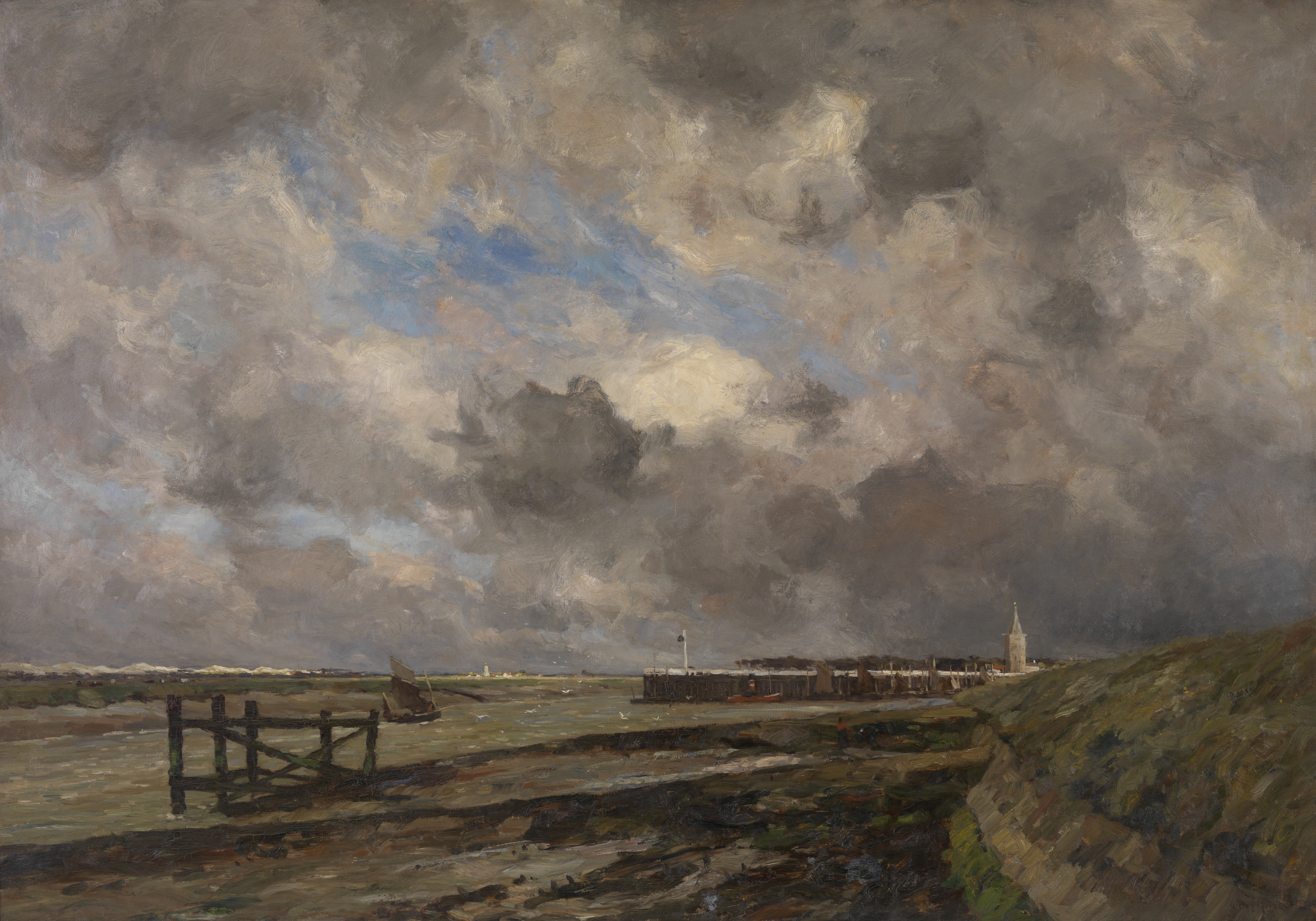
Showery weather in Nieuwpoort, 1901

Victor Gilsoul (1867–1939) was a Belgian painter, watercolorist and printmaker known for his landscapes, marines, urban sights, genre scenes with figures and architectural views. His works incorporated impressionist and luminist tendencies. A successful artist, he was patronized by European nobility including the king of Belgium.

== Early life ==
Victor Gilsoul was born in Brussels on 9 October 1867. His parents were Leopold Gilsoul and Thérèse Biers, who operated a pub in the suburbs of Brussels (Schaerbeek). The pub's clientele consisted mainly of unemployed painters and artists. The painter Louis Artan (1837–1890) was a regular customer and rented a room in the attic. Victor's father discouraged him from becoming an artist, but Louis Artan and animal painter Alfred Verwee (1838–1895) inspired the young Victor to become a painter. The landscape painter Franz Courtens was also influential him.

Gilsoul started drawing at age 12 and his work was received with enthusiasm by the regulars at the pub. He studied at the Academy of Fine Arts in Antwerp where he won first prize for landscape painting at 15 years old. In 1883, at 17, he had he debuted at the salon of Brussels with a landscape painting.

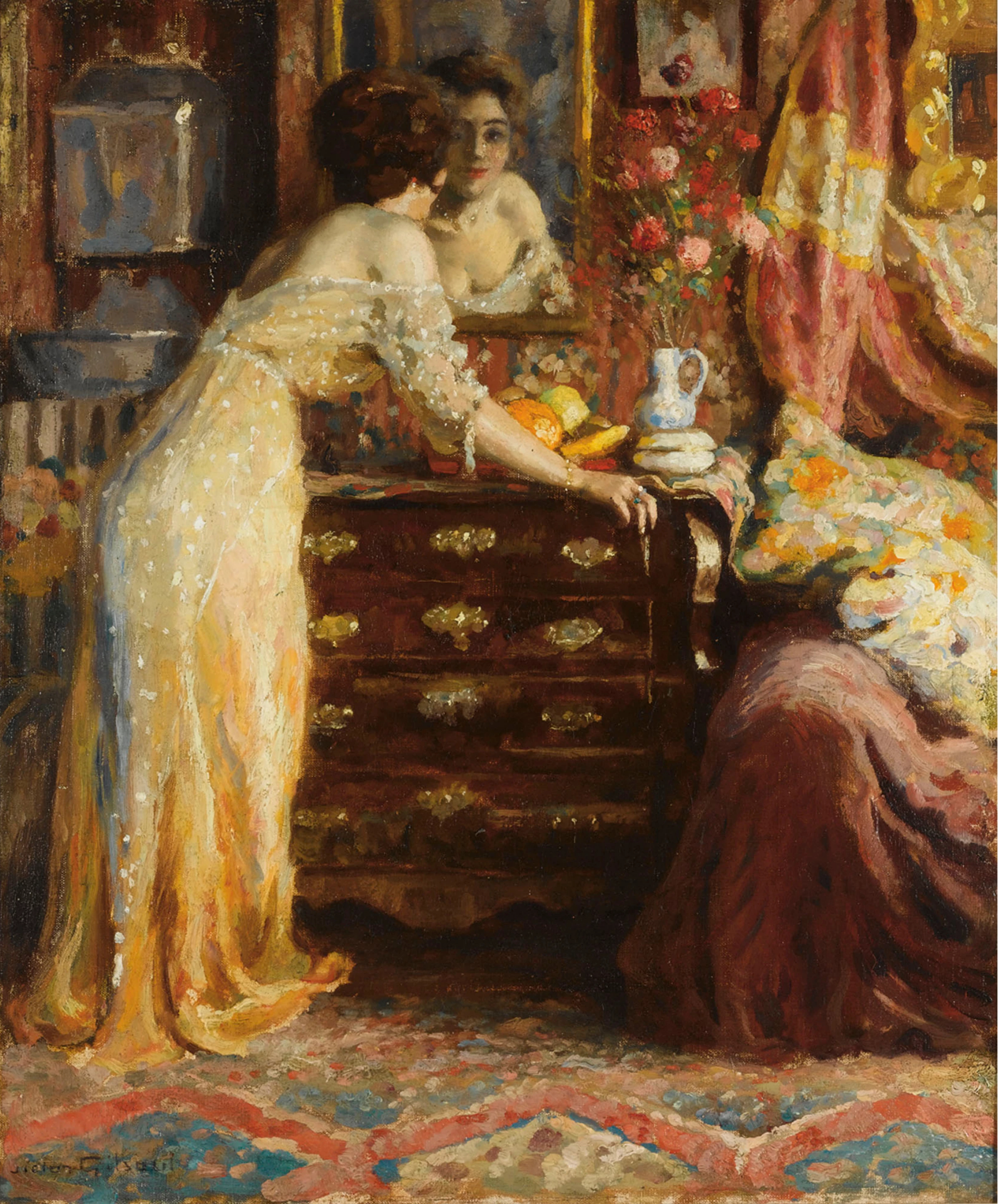
Making Her Toilet, c. 1908

== Career ==
Several royals of his time showed great interest in Gilsoul's work. In 1897, at an international exhibition in Munich, the Prince of Bavaria bought two of his paintings. King Leopold II of Belgium bought his painting twice, Crepuscule in 1890, and in 1901, thirteen paintings to decorate the royal yacht. Queen Mum Mary (mother of King Albert I of Belgium), in 1904, bought two of his paintings. In 1915, the city of Paris bought the painting Mannekensvere. In 1899, the Museum of Krefeld bought the painting Lever du lune. In 1902, the city of Brussels ordered four paintings.

In 1894, Victor Gilsoul married fellow artist Ketty Hoppe, the daughter of Eduouard Hoppe, a medal engraver. His wife was a gifted watercolorist. In 1898, King Leopold II of Belgium knighted Victor Gilsoul. In 1900, one of his paintings was awarded a silver medal at the World Exhibition in Paris.

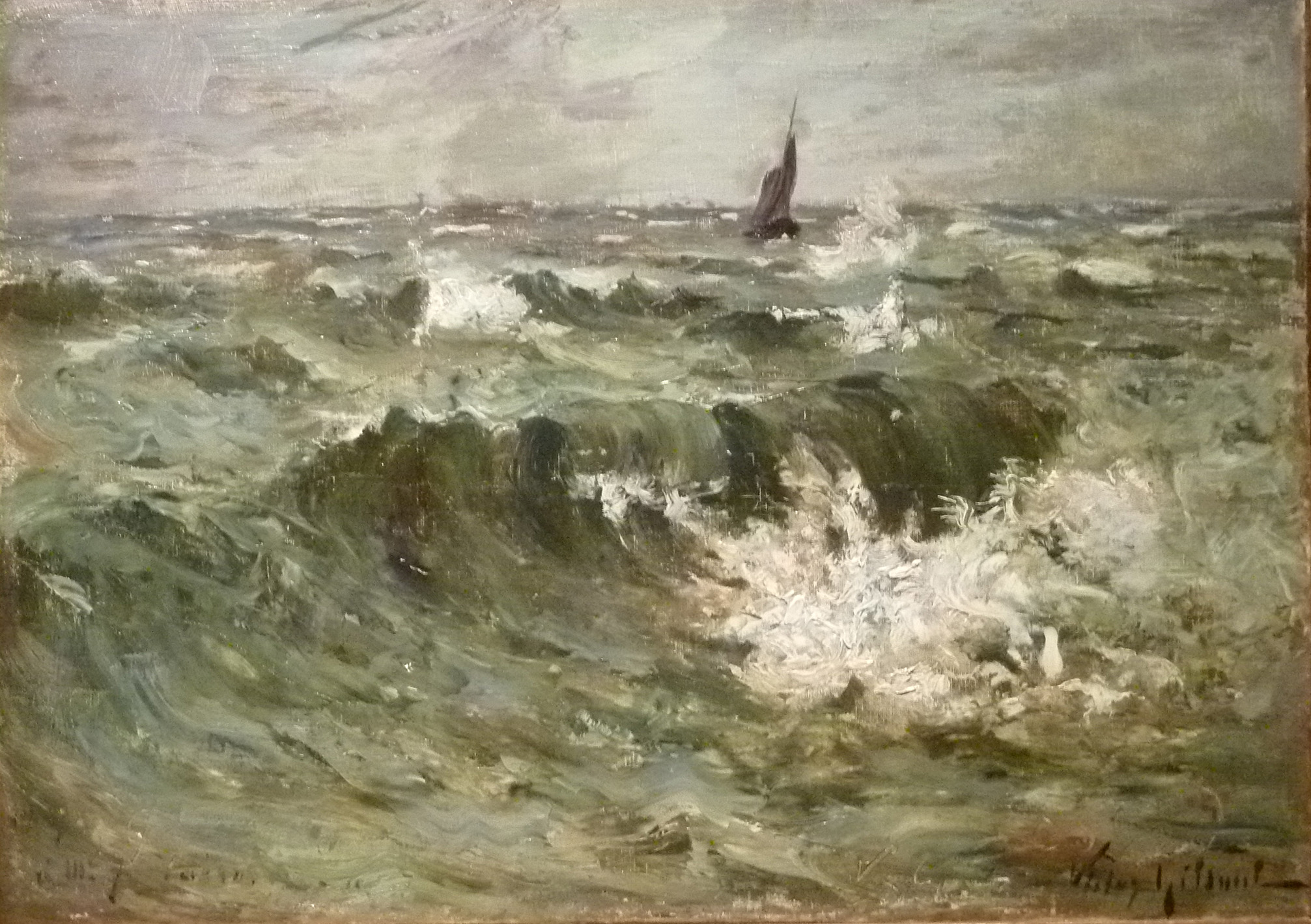
Turbulent weather on the North Sea

After he was convicted of arson in 1910, Gilsoul separated from his wife. In the same year, he was admitted to a psychiatric hospital and was put in a straitjacket. His personal physician was able to get him discharged on the day of his committal by negotiating and threatening a lawsuit. Later, Gilsoul moved to France and commuted between Paris and Belgium.

In 1914, at the beginning of World War I, Victor fled to the neutral Netherlands. Between, 1910 and 1923, during the French period, Victor Gilsoul had a studio in Paris (Avenue Villiers XVII arrondissement). In 1924, Victor became a professor at the Higher Institute for Fine Arts in Antwerp. In 1933, Gilsoul started to work on his last workshop, in Brussels (Woluwe-Saint-Lambert. Victor Gilsoul died on 5 December 1939, the eve of World War II.

== Style ==
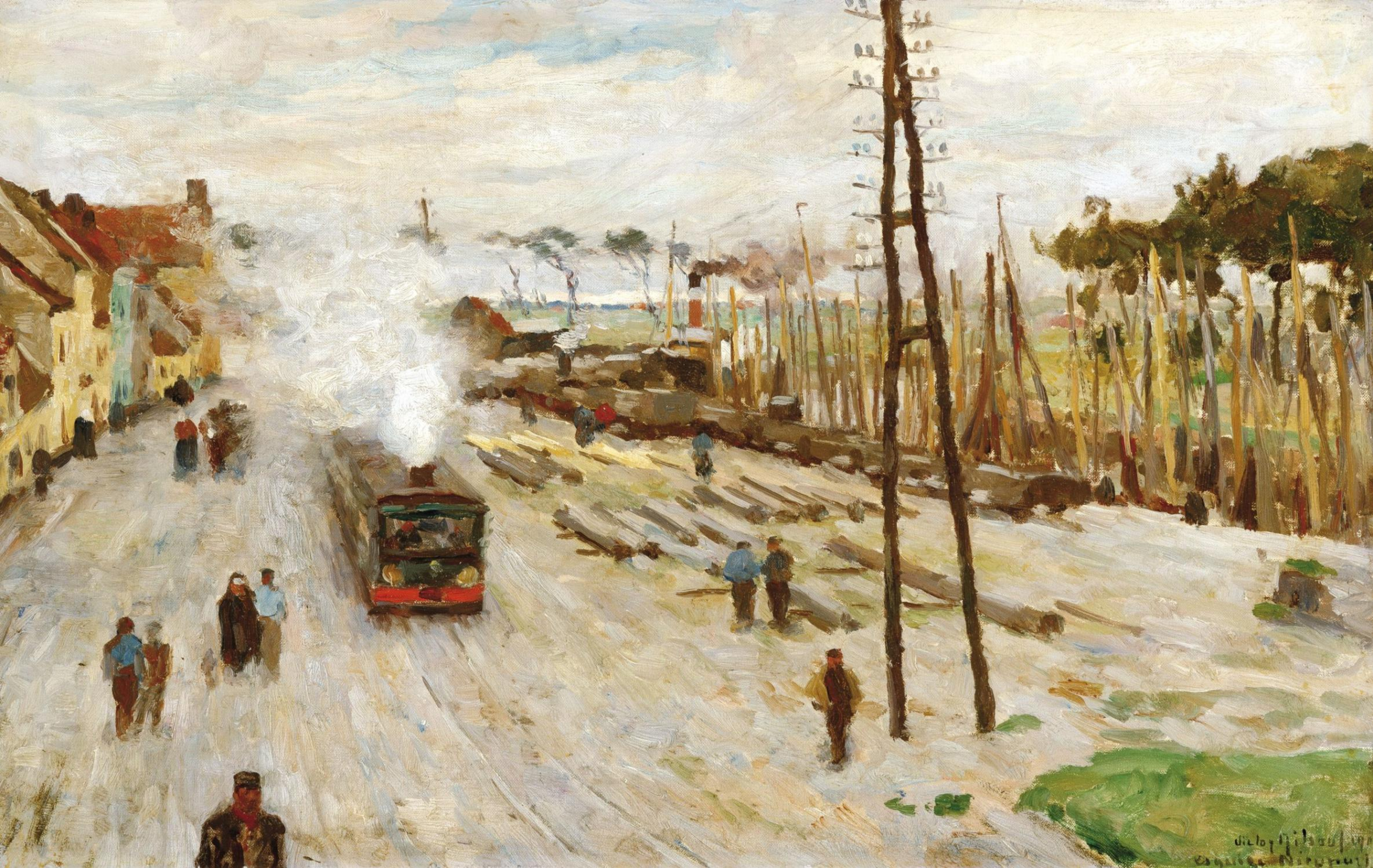
The tram engine at Nieuwpoort, 1904

Four elements reoccur in his paintings: storms, waves, rivers and nature. In general, Gilsoul favored depictions of water. He style of painting went through various stages. His major works are neither entirely realistic, nor completely impressionistic. They were not created on site; however, they were the result of studies that he made consistently throughout his life. These studies of nature give a superposition of mood, deepening, images and light. Of these different images and sensations, he composed a summary on a large canvas, which has a stronger suggestive power than any painting of that nature.

== Collections ==
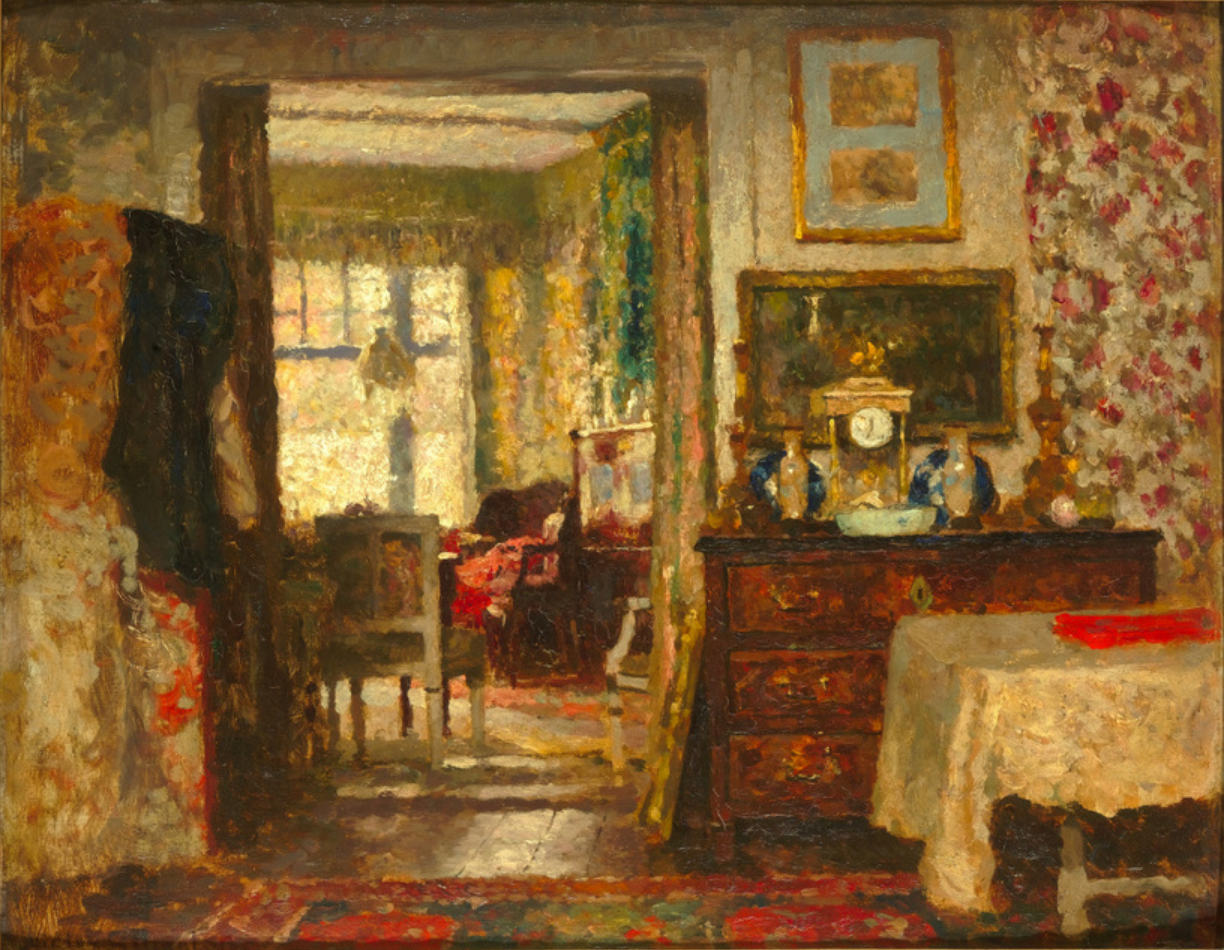
Studio of the painter Albert Roelofs in Scheveningen, 1914

Gilsoul's art is found in significant public and private collections worldwide, including the Charlier Museum, the Royal Museum of Fine Arts Antwerp and the Musée d'Orsay, as well as museums located in Luxembourg, Namur, Oostende, Mons, Dordrecht, Brighton and Barcelona.

== Sources ==
=== Books ===
- Mauclair, Camille (1909). Victor Gilsoul: collection des artistes belges contemporains. G. van Oest.
- Meere de, J. M. M., Victor Gilsoul en de haven van Rotterdam, Velp, Nederland, 1998

=== Magazines ===
- Solvay L., Victor Gilsoul, artiste peintre, in : Académie Royale de Belgique. Bulletin de la Classe des Beaux-Arts. Tome XXVI, 1944. Bruxelles, 1945, p. 43-52.
- Veen, van der L., The Art of Victor Gilsoul, in: Studio, vol. 33 nr. 140, 1904, p. 118-124.
