= André Lhote =

French sculptor and painter (1885–1962)

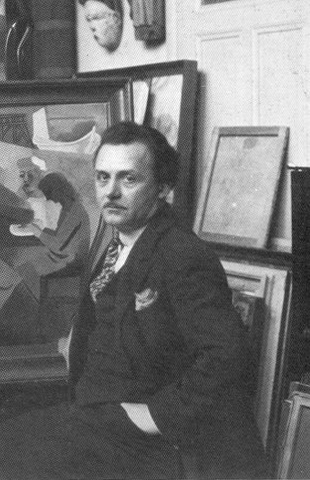
- André Lhote, 1925
- Born: 5 July 1885; Bordeaux, France
- Died: 24 January 1962 (aged 76); Paris, France
- Movement: Fauvism; Cubism
- Awards: Grand Prix National de Peinture; 1955

André Lhote (5 July 1885 – 24 January 1962) was a French Cubist painter of figure subjects, portraits, landscapes, and still life. He was also active and influential as a teacher and writer on art.

== Early life and education ==
Lhote was born 5 July 1885 in Bordeaux, France, and learned wood carving and sculpture from the age of 12, when his father apprenticed him to a local furniture maker to be trained as a sculptor in wood. He enrolled at the École des Beaux-Arts in Bordeaux in 1898 and studied decorative sculpture until 1904.

Whilst there, he began to paint in his spare time and he left home in 1905, moving into his own studio to devote himself to painting. He was influenced by Gauguin and Cézanne and held his first one-man exhibition at the Galerie Druet in 1910, four years after he had moved to Paris.

== Career ==
After initially working in a Fauvist style, Lhote shifted towards Cubism and joined the Section d'Or group in 1912, exhibiting at the Salon de la Section d'Or. He was alongside some of the fathers of modern art, including Gleizes, Villon, Duchamp, Metzinger, Picabia and La Fresnaye.

The outbreak of the First World War interrupted his work and, after discharge from the army in 1917, he became one of the group of Cubists supported by Léonce Rosenberg. In 1918, he co-founded Nouvelle Revue Française, the art journal to which he contributed articles on art theory until 1940.

Lhote taught at the Académie Notre-Dame des Champs from 1918 to 1920, and later taught at other Paris art schools—including the Académie de la Grande Chaumière and his own school, Academy André Lhote which he founded in Montparnasse in 1922.

He taught dozens of younger artists who would go on to become famous, including a remarkable number of whom (considering the era) were female: Elena Mumm Thornton Wilson, Kristin Saleri, Henri Cartier-Bresson, Conrad O'Brien-ffrench, Adamson-Eric, Simon Elwes, William Crozier, William Geissler, William Gillies, Elvire Geblesco Bibesco, Kuno Veeber, Charlotte van Pallandt, Grace Crowley, Wesley E. Johnson, Sava Šumanović, Margaret Lefranc, Shirley Russell, Gwyneth Johnstone, Paul Kane, Julie van der Veen, Michael Wishart, Lino Spilimbergo, Amalia Nieto, Héctor Sgarbi, Tamara de Lempicka, Sárika Góth, Berthe Edersheim, Nancy van Overveldt, Pierrette Bloch, Samir Rafi, Gerda Sutton, Sarah Marindah Baker, Genevieve Pezet, Shokouh Riazi, Javad Hamidi, Eren Eyüboğlu, Bedri Rahmi Eyüboğlu, Elizabeth Rivers, Mainie Jellett, Helen Stewart, Anna-Eva Bergman, Adele Änggård, Borko Lazeski and Hans Hartung.

Lhote lectured extensively in France and other countries, including Belgium, England, Italy and, from the 1950s, also in Egypt and Brazil. In Egypt, Lhote worked with Effat Nagy using Egyptian archaeology as subject matter for their work.

His work was rewarded with the Grand Prix National de Peinture for 1955, and the UNESCO commission for sculpture appointed Lhote president of the International Association of Painters, Engravers and Sculptors.

=== Death ===
Lhote died in Paris in 1962.

== Gallery of works ==
French Landscape, 1912, oil on canvas, 89 x 116 cm, Musée des Beaux-Arts de Bordeaux

L'Escale (The Stopover), 1913, oil on canvas, 210 x 185 cm, Musée d’Art Moderne de la Ville de Paris

Sketch for L'Escale, 1913, published in Montjoie!, n.5, 14 April 1913

14 July, Port de Bordeaux-Poincaré, 1913–14, oil on canvas, 65 x 81.5 cm, private collection

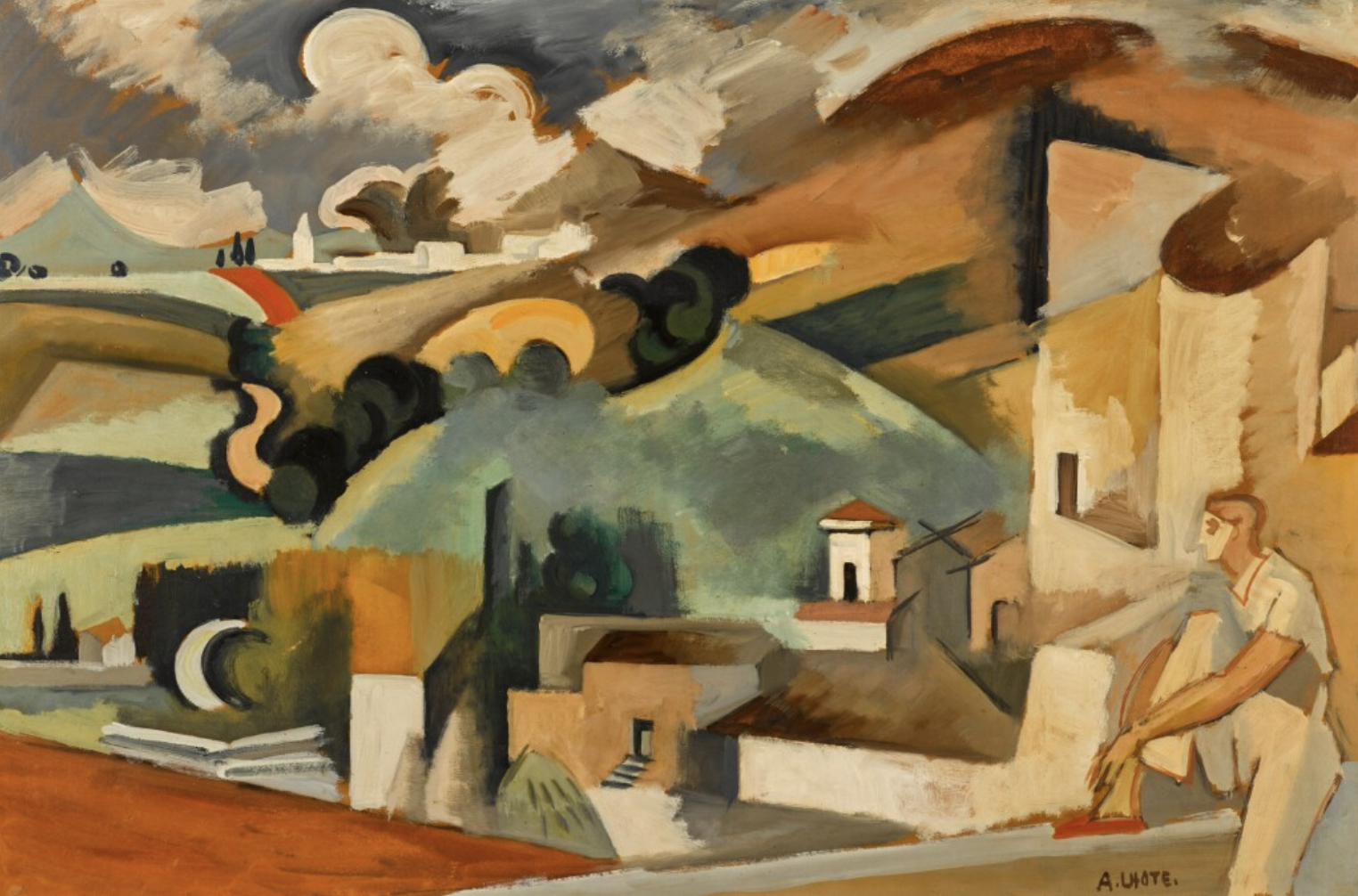
Paysage de Mirmande or Le Guetteur, 1939, oil on canvas, 77.5 x 104.5 cm, private collection
