= Jo Koster =

Dutch artist (1868–1944)

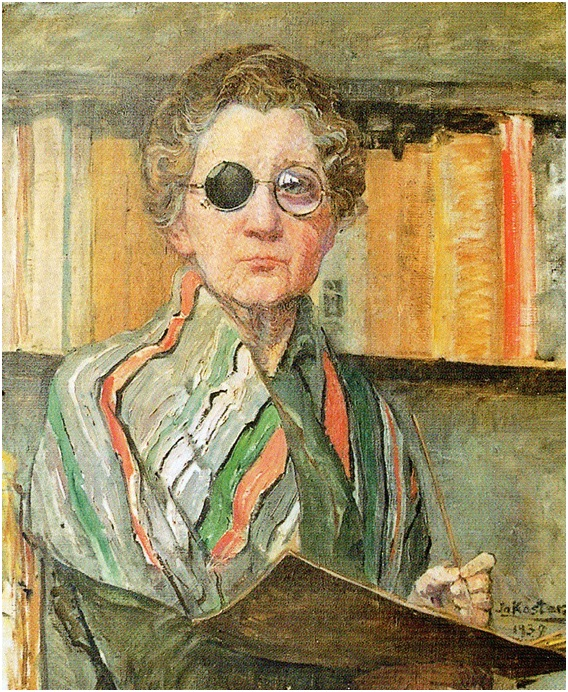
- Self portrait 1939
- Born: 16 April 1868; Kampen, Netherlands
- Died: 15 April 1944 (aged 75); Heelsum, Netherlands
- Other names: Jojanna Petronella Catharina Antoinetta Koster
- Known for: Painting
- Movement: Pointillism

Johanna Petronella Catharina Antoinetta (Jo) Koster (1868–1944) was a Dutch Neo-Impressionist and pointillist painter.

== Biography ==
Koster was born on 16 April 1868 in Kampen, Netherlands. She was the third of eight children. Her early education from 1881 through 1885 was in Dordrecht where she excelled in art and music. In 1885 she moved to Amsterdam where she attended the Rijksnormaalschool voor Tekenonderwijs (National Normal School for Drawing Teachers). In 1888 she moved to Rotterdam where she attended the Tekenacademie (Drawing Academy). In 1891 she exhibited in her first group show.

In 1894 Koster received a fellowship to study in Brussels and Paris. In Paris she studied at the Académie Julian and the Académie Colarossi. She spent several years at Ernest Blanc-Garin's workshop in Brussels. There she became acquainted with the work of artists involved with Les XX and La Libre Esthétique. During this period Koster began painting portraits which would become a source of income for her.

Koster returned to Holland in 1897, settling in The Hague. She was engaged for a time, but decided not to marry. In 1899 she moved to Laren where she became friends with the painter Adrienne van Rees-Dutilh. In 1901 she exhibited her work at the annual Kunstenaarsvereniging Sint Lucas show at the Stedelijk Museum Amsterdam. The art dealer, Nico van Harpen (1858–1931) took notice of her and sold her art to American and South African collectors. Koster also began a friendship with Lidy van Bosse, who was able to arrange for portrait commissions which provided income.

In 1902 Koster relocated to Zwolle. She studied with Henk Bremmer who was also a supporter of her work. At this time Koster's work was commanding high prices. She was working in a style influenced by her French contemporaries as well as a naturalistic style.

In 1910 Koster settled in Hattem which had a lively arts scene. Two of her works were included in the 1913 show De Vrouw 1813–1913 (Women 1813–1913) in Amsterdam which celebrated the hundredth anniversary of the Netherlands liberation from French occupation. Around this time Koster was moving towards a more Pointillist style and she was also finding work as an illustrator.

In the early part of the 20th century Koster traveled to England and Italy. After World War I she traveled to Germany, Switzerland, and France. She spent much of 1923 in Italy, where she wrote travel articles. In the late 1920s she spent her summers in Brittany where she met the New Zealand painters Iva McEldowney and Vera Vial. In 1930 she traveled through Europe with McEldowney and Vial. In 1932 she traveled to Selva, Mallorca with Geertruida van Hettinga Tromp.

Koster lived in The Hague from 1934 through 1943. She participated in group shows in the 1940s receiving good reviews from critics. In the winter of 1939-1940 four works of Koster's were included in the show Onze Kunst van Heden (Our Art of Today) at the Rijksmuseum.

In 1942, with the threat of a German invasion, Koster left The Hague along with her friend Geertruida van Hettinga Tromp, settling in Zaltbommel at the home of Tromp's sister. In late 1943 she visited Lidy van Spengler in Heelsum. She fell ill there and died on 15 April 1944.

Koster was a member of and exhibited with Arti et Amicitiae, the Kunstenaarsvereniging Sint Lucas, the Vereeniging van Beeldende Kunstenaars, De Rotterdammers (Association of Visual Artists), and the Pulchri Studio. From 1891 through 1940 Koster participated in many group and solo exhibitions in Holland from a solo exhibit at the Museum De Lakenhal in 1898, through a group exhibition at the Rijksmuseum in 1939.

Her work is in the collections of the Kröller-Müller Museum and the Rijksmuseum. Koster's work has been exhibited posthumously in the 1968 show Nedrelanse Erfenis (Dutch Heritage) at the Pretoria Art Museum, in 1988 at the Kunsthandel Les Beaux Arts The Hague. In 1990 she was included in the exhibition Schilders rond Bremmer (Painters around Bremmer) at The Bremmerhuis. The same year her work was included in the traveling exhibition Het Boereninterieur in de Nederlandse schilderkunst (The Peasant Interior in Dutch Painting). In 1991 she was included in Schilders van Hattem (Painters of Hattem) at the Voerman Museum Hattem. In 2001 she was included in the exhibition Het netwerk van H. P. Bremmer (The Network of H. P. Bremmer) presented by the Hannema-de Stuers Foundation. In 2003 she was the subject of the exhibition Jo Koster 1868-1944: een zwervend bestaan (Jo Koster 1868-1944: A Wandering Existence) at the Stedelijk Museum Zwolle.

== Gallery ==
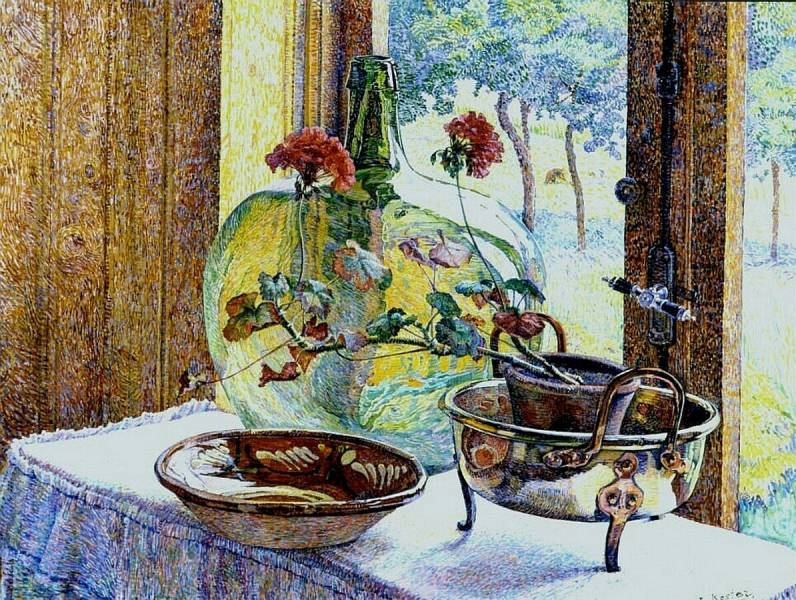
Stilleven, 1912

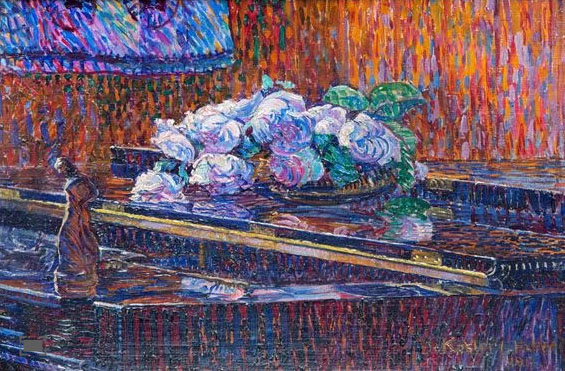
A still life of roses and a sculpture on a piano, 1917

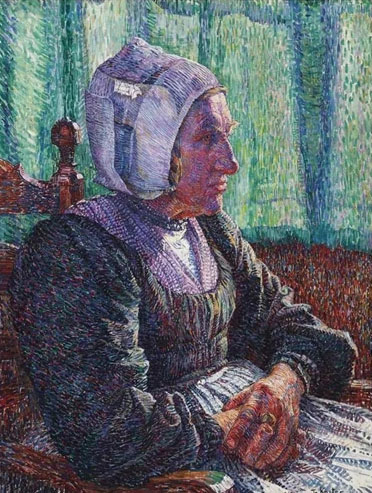
Farmer’s wife, 1917

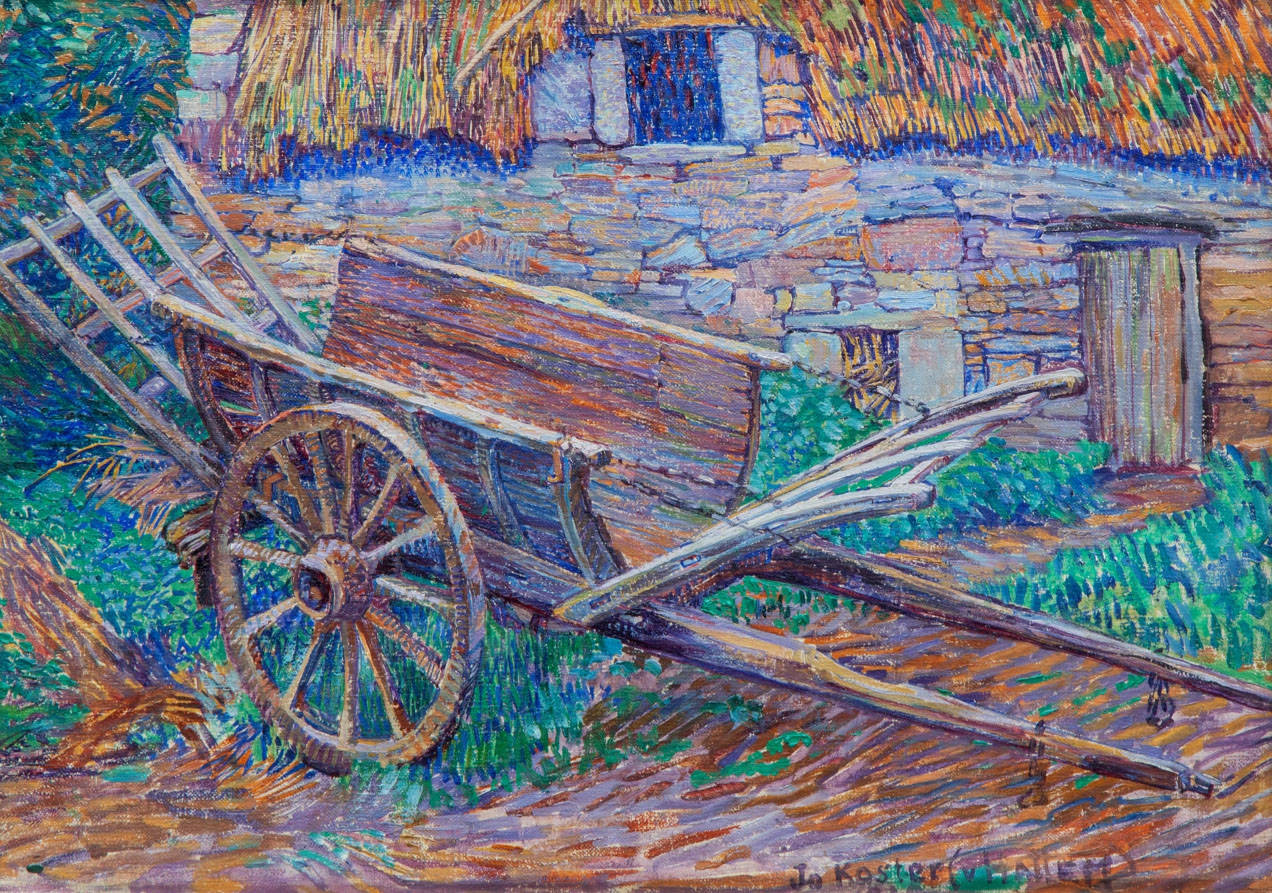
A wheelbarrow in front of a farm, 1920
