= Adya van Rees-Dutilh =

Dutch artist

- Born: 7 June 1876; Rotterdam, Netherlands
- Died: 11 August 1959 (aged 83); Utrecht, Netherlands
- Other name: Adrienne van Rees-Dutilh
- Known for: Painting, textile arts
- Spouse: Otto van Rees (m. 1909; died in 1957)

Adrienne (Adya) van Rees-Dutilh (7 June 1876 – 11 August 1959) was a Dutch textile artist, painter and graphic artist. She was part of the Dada movement in Zürich and was one of the early signatories of the first Berlin Dada manifesto.

== Biography ==
Rees-Dutilh née Dutilh was born on 7 June 1876 in Rotterdam, Netherlands. She studied drawing with Barbara Elisabeth van Houten in The Hague and went on to study with Ernest Blanc-Garin at his workshop in Brussels. In 1909 she married fellow artist Otto van Rees with whom she had three children. The couple lived the Montmartre area of Paris along with a group of artist known as Bateau-Lavoir. Around this time Rees-Dutilh began focusing on creating abstract tapestries and embroidery.

Rees-Dutilh converted to Catholicism in 1914 and religion became a subject of her later art.

She moved to Switzerland during World War I. In November 1915 she and Otto participated in a Dada group exhibition at the Galerie Tanner in Zürich. Adya exhibited her embroidery. In 1918 she signed the Berlin Dada manifesto.

Rees-Dutilh moved to Paris and became involved with the art group Cercle et Carré (Circle and Square). By World War II Rees-Dutilh was separated, but not divorced from Otto. She spent the war years in Switzerland where she concentrated on embroidering historic and religious subjects. She returned to the Netherlands in 1949. She lived with Otto in Utrecht until his death in 1957. Her eyesight had deteriorated and she was unable to work.

Rees-Dutilh died on 11 October 1959 in Utrecht.
