= Camille Berlin =

French painter (1866 – ?)

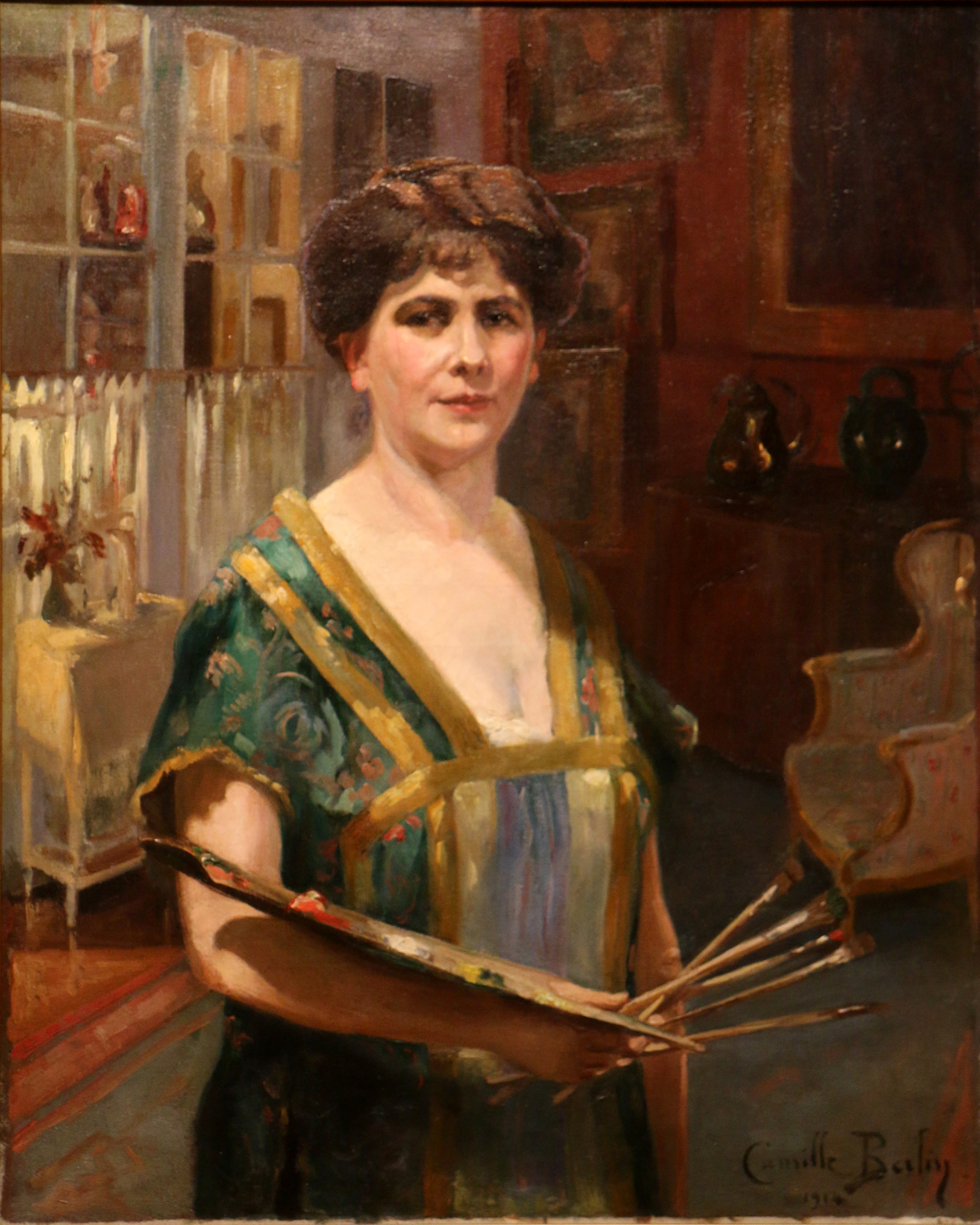
- Born: 6 February 1866; Paris, France
- Died: unknown

Camille Berlin (6 February 1866 – ?) was a French painter.

== Early life and education ==
Camille Berlin was born on 6 February 1866 in the 4th arrondissement of Paris to Félicie Léontine Esmieu and Étienne Napoléon Berlin. Her parents married in 1863 and her older sister, Berthe Antoinette Félicie, was born nine months later. Her father, a primary school teacher, was headmaster of the local school at the time of her birth.

Camille Berlin studied painting with Jean-Joseph Benjamin-Constant and Jean-Paul Laurens at the Académie Julian, and with Henri-Jean Guillaume Martin.

== Career ==
Camille Berlin exhibited at the Salon des artistes français from 1889 and her work was awarded an honorable mention in 1900. She won a silver medal at l'exposition internationale d'Angers in 1895. She exhibited works in exhibitions in Troyes, Nantes, Angers and Montauban.

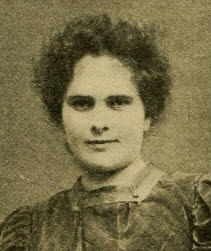
Camille Berlin as a young woman

Her painting studio was at 65, rue de Malte, in the 11th arrondissement of Paris.

Berlin joined the Union of Women Painters and Sculptors in 1892.

In 1901, Berlin was appointed Ordre des Palmes académiques then Officier de l'instruction publique in 1912.

In 1914, her painting Autoportrait dans l'atelier (Self-portrait in the studio) was exhibited at the 3rd Salon of the Union of Women Painters and Sculptors.

== Later life ==
Berlin moved to Toulon around 1920, and lived at 1 impasse Jeanne, faubourg du Mourillon. She later moved to villa Clair Logis, on avenue Frédéric-Mistral, La Seyne-sur-Mer around 1928. After selling her property on 5 June 1930, by 1931 she was living at 14 quai du Port in Marseille. She disappears from the public record after this date.

== Works in public collections ==
- Fillette aux cerises, 1907, huile sur toile, 46 × 55 cm; Musée Saint-Nazaire de Bourbon-Lancy.
- Autoportrait dans l'atelier, huile sur toile, 100 × 80 cm; Musée d'Art de Toulon.
Œuvres de Camille Berlin

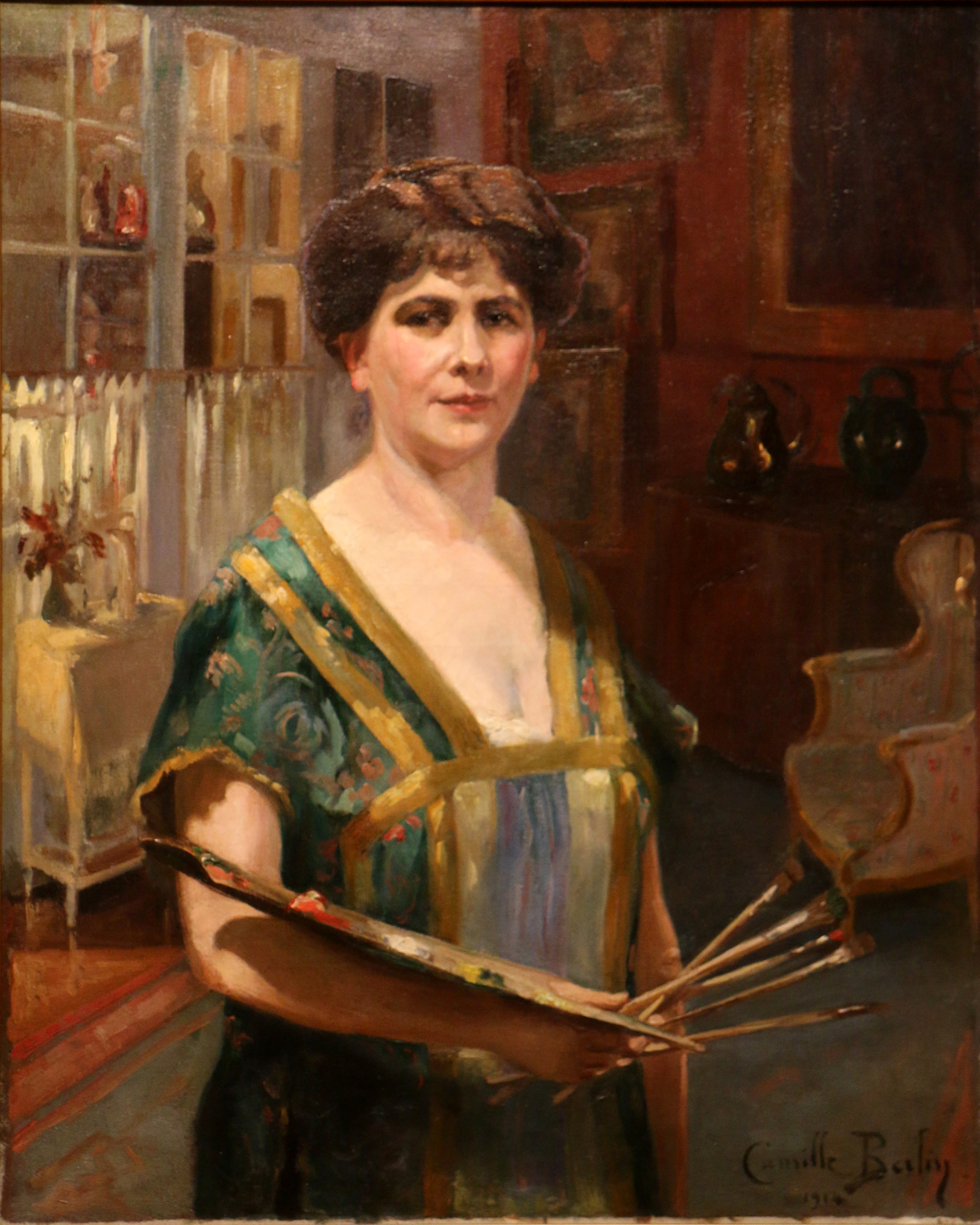
Autoportrait (1914), musée d'Art de Toulon

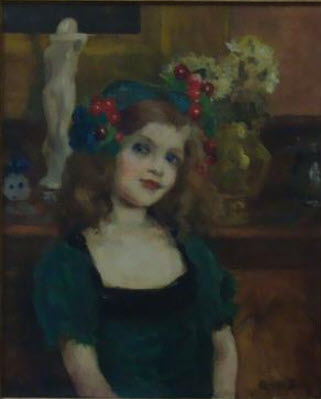
Fillette aux cerises (1907), musée Saint-Nazaire de Bourbon-Lancy

== Legacy and commemoration ==
Berlin's painting La lecture sous la lampe, (1899) was sold in the 1990s. Un soir, (1902) was sold in Chicago in 2023.

In 2016, the Musée d'Art de Toulon exhibited her Autoportrait dans l'atelier (Self-portrait in the studio) as part of the Elles s'exposent exhibition, which featured a hundred works by women artists held in its collections. An article in the regional newspaper Var-Matin celebrated Camille Berlin as "une Toulonnaise" (a woman from Toulon).

== Awards ==
- Officier d'Académie (1901).
- Officier de l'Instruction publique (1912).
