= Geertruida van Hettinga Tromp =

Dutch artist

- Born: Tjitske Geertruida Maria van Hettinga Tromp; 11 April 1872; Groningen, Netherlands
- Died: 22 February 1962 (aged 89); Zwolle, Netherlands
- Known for: Painting

Tjitske Geertruida Maria van Hettinga Tromp (1872-1962) was a Dutch painter.

== Biography ==
Hettinga Tromp was born on 11 April 1872 in Groningen. She studied at the Akademie van beeldende kunsten (Den Haag) (Royal Academy of Art, The Hague). She studied with Henk Bremmer. She was a member of the Pulchri Studio. In 1932 she traveled to Selva, Mallorca with fellow artist Jo Koster. Hettinga Tromp's work was included in the 1939 exhibition and sale Onze Kunst van Heden (Our Art of Today) at the Rijksmuseum in Amsterdam.

Hettinga Tromp died on 22 February 1962 in Zwolle.

One of her paintings, Still Life (1904), featuring a candlestick and a book, appeared in the exhibition called "How Van Gogh Came to Groningen." This exhibition opened at the Groninger Museum in Groningen in November 2024 and included Hettinga Tromp along with several other artists and collectors associated with Henk Bremmer, who stimulated local interest in the works of Vincent Van Gogh.
