= Félicie Ransy-Putzeys =

Belgian painter (1853–1929)

Félicie Ransy-Putzeys (1853–1929), also known as Félicie Putzeys, was a Belgian painter. She was a student of Willem Roelofs and was known for landscapes, still lifes, and depictions of flowers.

== Early life ==
Félicie Ransy-Putzeys was born in 1853 in Liège, Belgium. Her sister, Mariette Romiée, also became a painter. Ransy-Putzeys studied painting with the Dutch artist Willem Roelofs.

== Career ==
As a painter, she became known for her landscapes, still lifes, and depictions of flowers. Her landscapes most frequently depicted the regions of Meuse-Inférieure, the Ardennes, and Campine. She was active in the Parisian Union of Women Painters and Sculptors and the Brussels-based Cercle des Femmes Peintres. Alongside other women artists, she participated in Flemish artist colonies.

Ransy-Putzeys work received praise from contemporary critics. Her pieces appeared in exhibitions at Brussels' Cercle des Beaux-Arts between 1892 and 1922, as well as at various shows in Paris. In 1893, two of her paintings, Immortelles and Primroses and Oranges, were displayed at the World's Columbian Exposition in Chicago.

Her work is held in the collections of the Musée de l'Art Wallon, now part of the Musée des Beaux-Arts de Liège. The Noord-Veluws Museum included Ransy-Putzeys in its 2026 exhibition "Free-Spirited Women: Female Artists in the Veluwe and Flanders, 1870–1930".

== Personal life ==
Ransy-Putzeys died in 1929. Two years later, an eponymous scholarship was established in her honor.
