= Ketty Gilsoul-Hoppe =

Belgian painter (1868–1939)

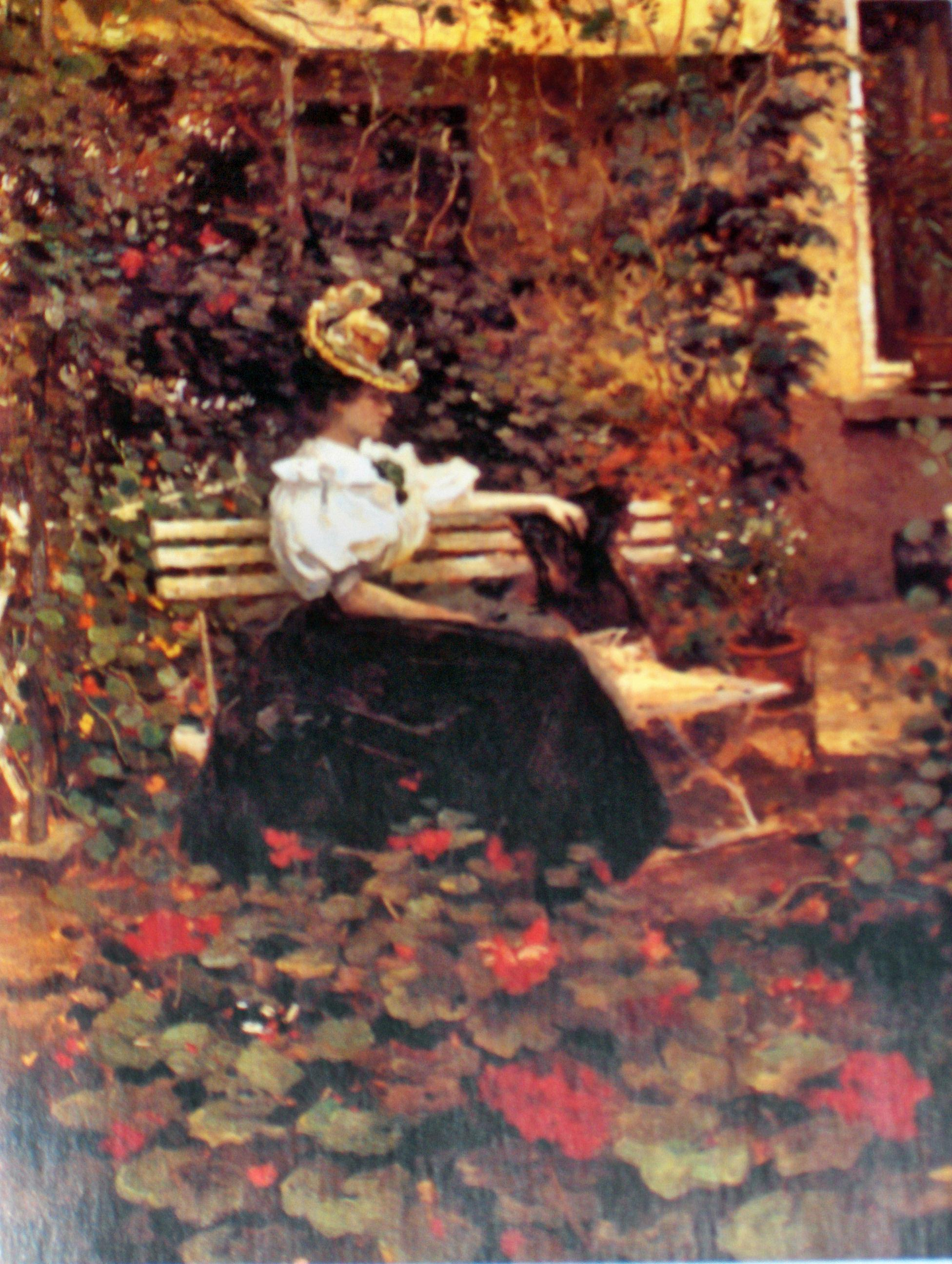
- Wife Ketty Gilsoul-Hoppe on the flowery terrace by Victor Gilsoul
- Born: 5 April 1868; Düsseldorf, Germany
- Died: 15 November 1939 (aged 71)
- Known for: Painting
- Style: Watercolor
- Spouse: Victor Gilsoul (1894-1910)

Ketty Gilsoul-Hoppe (5 April 1868 – 15 November 1939) was a Belgian painter who mostly worked in watercolors.

Gilsoul-Hoppe was born in Düsseldorf as the daughter of the engraver Edouard Hoppe. She trained in Bisschoffsheim school in Brussels where in 1894 she married the painter Victor Gilsoul.

She is known for interiors, landscapes and cityscapes, and her painting Interior hallway was included in the 1905 book Women Painters of the World.

== Gallery ==
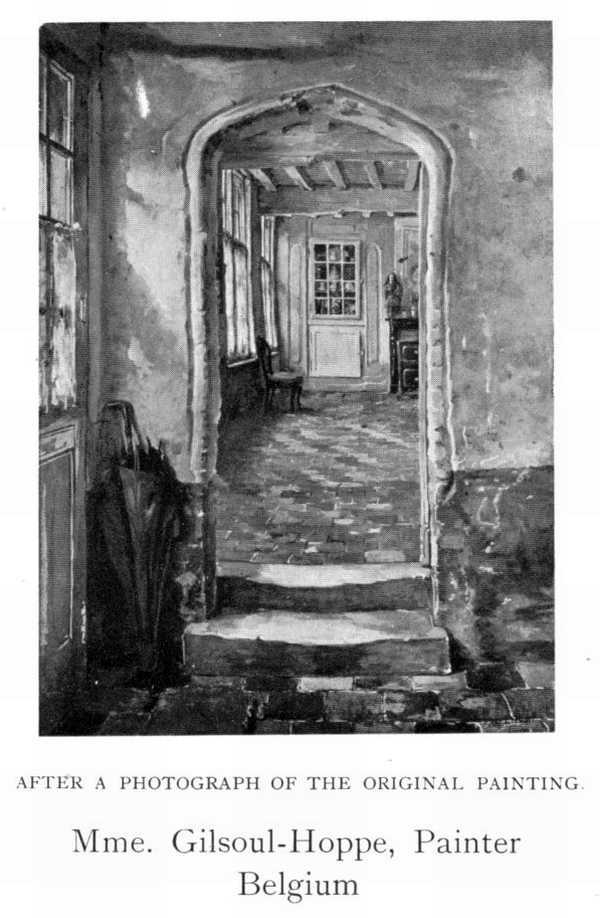
Interior hallway

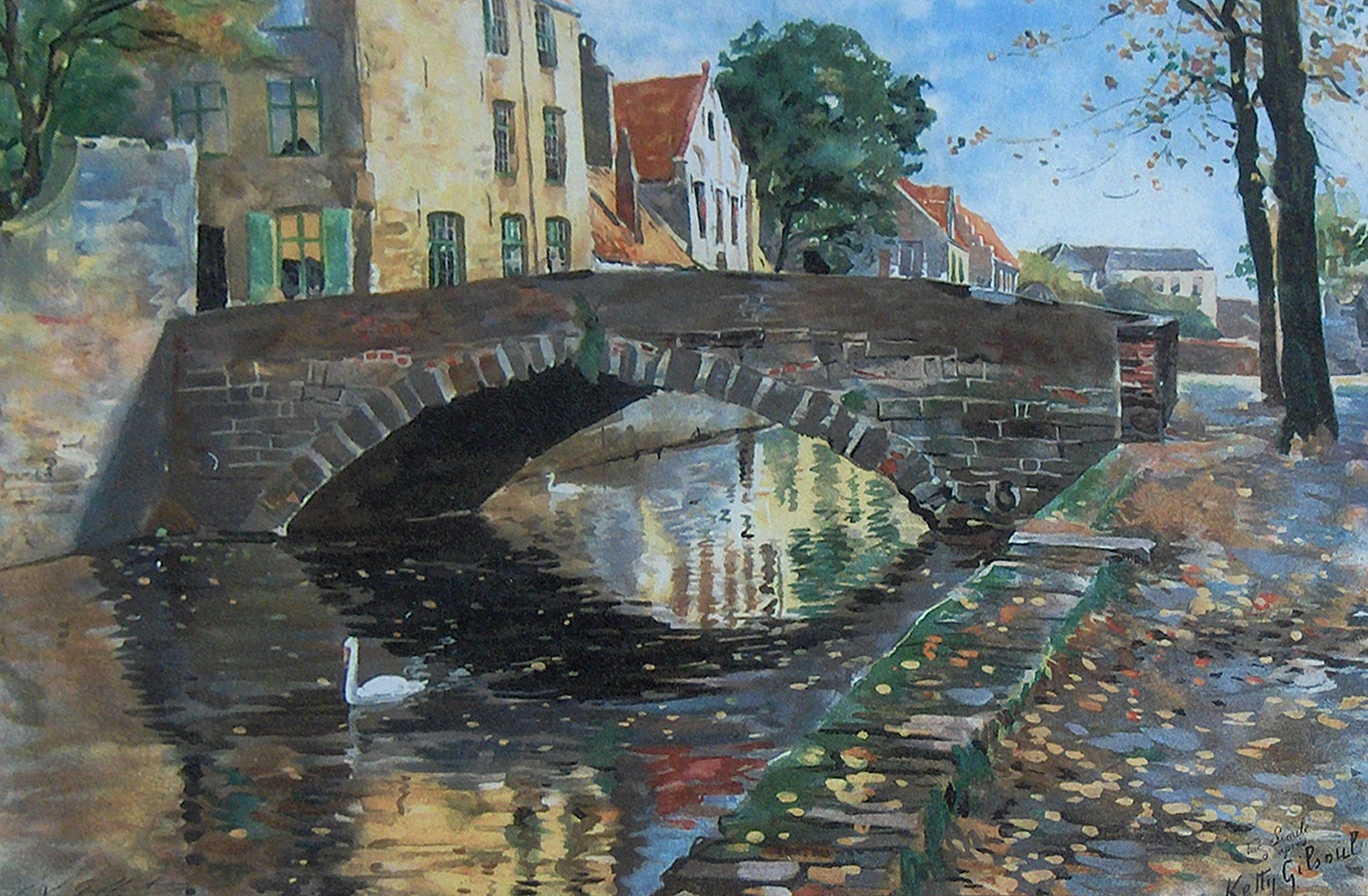
Bridge

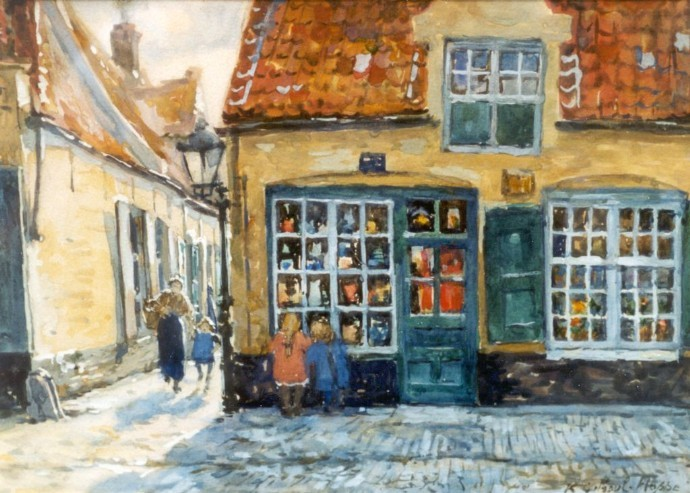
Children at the village shop

== Galerie Lyceum ==
She began a Brussels gallery in 1911 together with Berthe Art and some friends. The gallery was called the Galerie Lyceum. Other founding members were Alice Ronner, Emma Ronner, Anna Boch, Louise Danse, Marie Danse, and Juliette Wytsman.
