= Pierrette Bloch =

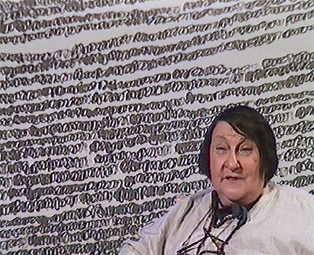
- Born: June 16, 1928; Paris, France
- Died: July 7, 2017 (aged 89); Paris, France
- Education: Henri Goetz, André Lhote
- Movement: Modern art
- Awards: prix Maratier 2005 de la Fondation Pro-MAHJ

Pierrette Bloch (June 16, 1928 – July 7, 2017) was a Paris-born Swiss painter and textile artist.

== Early life ==
Pierrette Bloch was born on June 16, 1928, in Paris. In 1939, Bloch and her parents left France for Switzerland escaping Nazi persecution as Jews. At the age of 15, she began living on her own in a hotel, which she says helped foster very early on a complete sense of independence and autonomy. After the liberation she returned to Paris and began her professional artistic training at the end of the 1940s, taking courses in sculptural arts.

== Career ==
Starting 1947 she attended the classes of the cubist painter André Lhote, and in 1949 she was the first student of the American-born artist Henri Goetz. Bloch began exhibiting her works in Paris and the United States in the 1950s. At the age of 23 she had her first exposition in the Mai gallery. Later in her life she exhibited in many renowned museums in Europe, Asia, and the Americas, including the MoMA and the Centre Pompidou.

The ensemble of her works have their roots in the use of "poor" materials such as ink, paper, mesh, and horsehair. The last of these, horsehair, began appearing in her work in the 1970s, with her first sculpture using horsehair created in 1979, and have become one of the key symbols of her work. The corpus of her work thus spans mediums, including drawings, collages and three-dimensional pieces, and falls into the category of postwar abstraction.

A monograph on Pierrette Bloch was published in November 2013 by Musée Jenisch.

== Death ==
Bloch died on July 7, 2017, in Paris at the age of 89.

== Biography ==
- 1947-48 - Studying with Henri Goetz and André Lhote.
- 1949 - Becomes friends with Colette and Pierre Soulages.
- 1951 - Has first solo exhibitions in Paris at Galerie Mai, and also exhibits at Harvard in the United States.
- 1953 - Starts creating collages.
- 1973 - Chains first begin appearing in her body of work.
- 1984 - Begins using horsehair in her works. The hair was at the time purchased without clear intentions, but became clear in her artistic path.
- 1994 - First paper lines.
- 2005 - The foundation Pro-MAHJ awards le prix Maratier 2005 to Pierrette Bloch for the ensemble of her works.

== Key exhibitions ==
- 1999 - Retrospective at the Musée de Grenoble.
- 2002 - Exhibition at the Cabinet d’art graphique of Centre Pompidou.
- 2003 - Exhibition at the Picasso Museum, Antibes.
- 2009 - Exhibition at Musée Fabre, Montpellier.
- 2010 - Participated in the exhibition On line du MOMA, New York.

== Public collections ==
- Museum of Modern Art, New York, US.
- Musée Bellerive, Zurich, Suisse.
- Musée National d'Art Moderne, Centre Georges Pompidou, Paris, France.
- Musée d'Art Moderne de la Ville de Paris, Paris, France.
- Fonds National d'Art Contemporain, Paris, France.
- Musée d'Eilat, Israël.
- Stedelijk Museum, Amsterdam, Pays-Bas.

== Quotations ==
« J’entreprends un long voyage sur une feuille, je m’enveloppe dans ce parcours; ce n’est plus une surface, mais une aventure dans le temps. Le format n’existe plus. » ("I undertake a long voyage on a sheet of paper, I envelop myself in the journey; it's no longer a surface, but an adventure in time. The format of the work ceases to exist.")
