= Cercle des Femmes Peintres =

Women's art society in Brussels

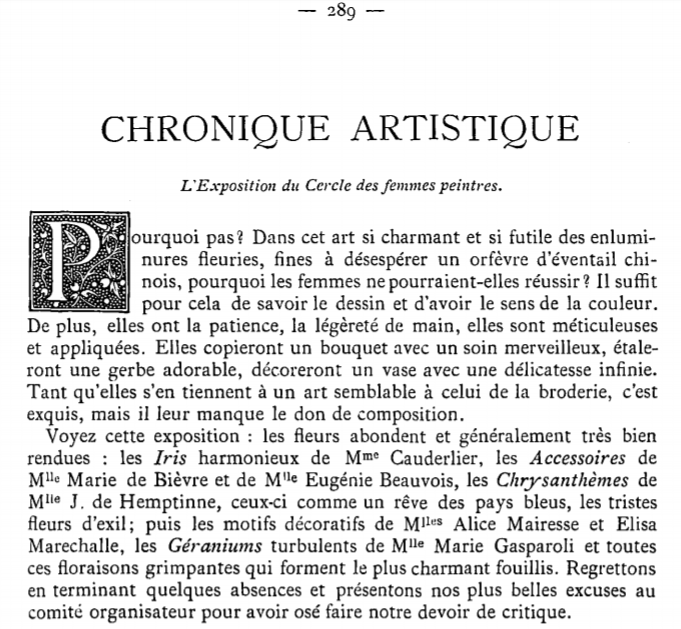
A belittling review of their 1890 exhibition from July 1890 in La Jeune Belgique

The Cercle des Femmes Peintres ("Circle of Women Painters") was a society for women artists in Brussels, active during the years 1888–1893. This society was likely inspired by the Paris-based Union des Femmes Peintres et Sculpteurs.

Eugénie Beauvois, a still-life painter, was named the vice chairman at the start. Most of the women who joined had previously been refused a seat at all other official artist societies due to their sex.

Among the members were Jeanne Adrighetti, Alix d'Anethan, Berthe Art, Marie de Bièvre, Marguérite Dielman, Mathilde Dupré-Lesprit, Mary Gasparioli, Marie Heijermans, Pauline Jamar, Rosa Leigh, Alice Ronner, Emma Ronner, Rosa Venneman, Marguerite Verboeckhoven, Emma Verwee, and Félicie Ransy-Putzeys.

They organized four exhibitions in 1888, 1890, 1892 and 1893. All members were women amateurs.

== Sources ==
- Cercle des Femmes Peintres (tentoonstellingscatalogus), Brussel (Musée de Peinture Moderne), 1890.
- (French) La Jeune Belgique, 1890: Chronique Artistique: commentaar op de tentoonstelling van de "Cercle des Femmes Peintres"
