= Ernest Blanc-Garin =

French painter

- Born: 8 October 1843; Givet, France
- Died: 1916 (aged 72–73); Brussels, Belgium
- Known for: Painting

Ernest Blanc-Garin or Ernest-Stanislas Blanc-Garin (8 October 1843 – 1916) was a French painter.

Blanc-Garin was born in Givet on 8 October 1843. He studied at the Académie Royale des Beaux-Arts in Brussels. He trained many students in his workshop in Brussels.

Blanc-Garin died in Brussels in 1916.

== Blanc-Garin's students ==
Blanc-Garin's students include:

- Ernest Betigny
- Louise Brohée
- Juliette Degouve de Nuncques
- Marguerite Dielman
- Dagmar Furuhjelm
- Marie Heijermans
- Anna Kernkamp
- Jo Koster
- Ina Lycklama à Nijeholt
- Adèle Maria de Marez Oyens
- Augustine Obreen
- Frans Oerder
- Louis Raemaekers
- Adya van Rees-Dutilh
- Jean Van den Eeckhoudt
- Marguerite Verboeckhoven
- Christina Verbrugghe
- Hubert Vos
- Chrisje van der Willigen

== Gallery ==
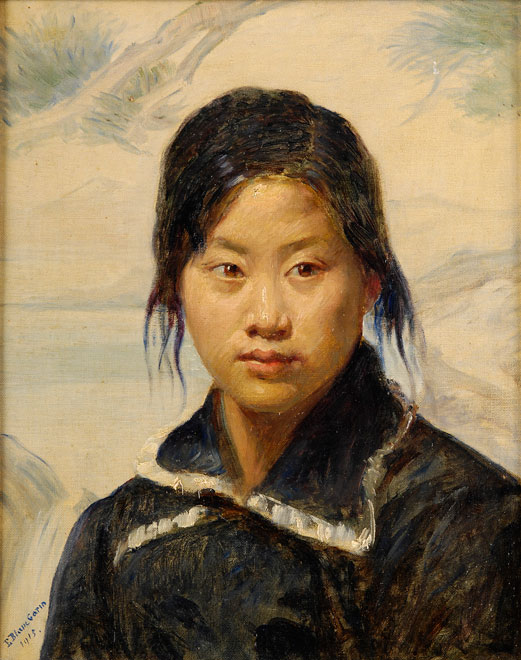
Portrait of a young Chinese woman
