= Gerda Sutton =

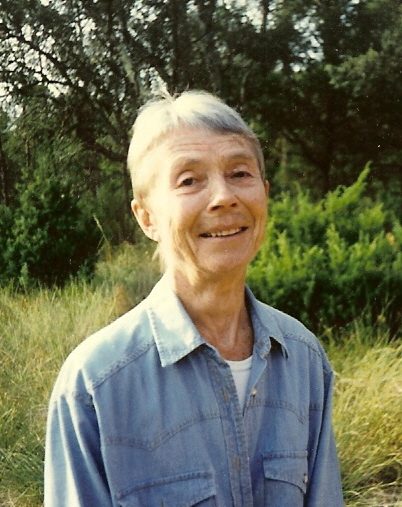
- Born: 3 April 1923; Bedford, Bedfordshire, England
- Died: 30 September 2005 (aged 82); 18th arrondissement of Paris, France
- Citizenship: France
- Occupation(s): atomic researcher and painter
- Children: 2, including Jenny Arasse
- Website: https://gerdasutton.com/

Gerda Mary Sutton (née Madgwick, 3 April 1923–30 September 2005) was a British atomic researcher and painter who became a naturalised citizen of France.

== Life ==
Sutton was born in Bedford, Bedfordshire in 1923.

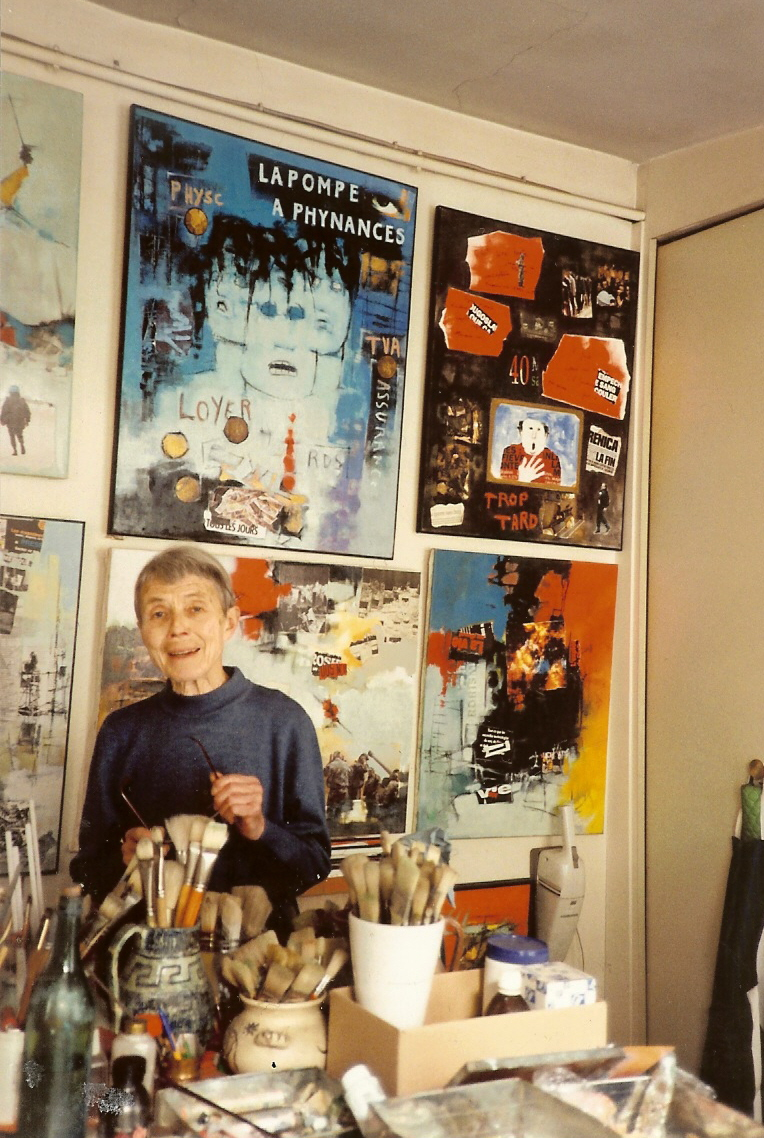
Sutton in 1999

She studied and worked in the atomic research field in Montreal, Canada, then in Harwell, England. She left her atomic research career and moved to France to focus on painting.

Sutton studied art at the Académie André Lhote alongside William Klein, Frédéric Menguy and Henri Cartier-Bresson. During the 1950s, she firstly painted in a realistic style, before producing cubist landscapes and expressionist characters. After the terrorist attacks in Paris in the mid-eighties and the Gulf War, her works became more radical and featured "violent forms of abstraction and collage."

Sutton became involved with the group Reflets around 1965. From 1977 she was a member of the Union des Femmes Peintres et Sculpteurs (Union of Women Painters and Sculptors). Her works were exhibited in several French galleries including in Biarritz, Cannes and Paris.

She became a naturalised French citizen in 1993, and died in 2005 at the 18th arrondissement of Paris.
