= Anna Kernkamp =

Belgian artist

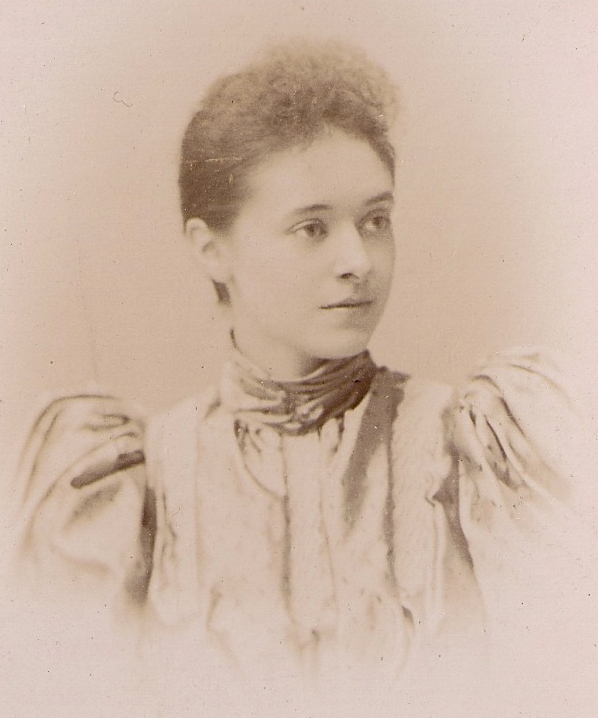
- Born: 18 June 1868; Antwerp, Belgium
- Died: 9 February 1947 (aged 78); Brasschaat, Belgium
- Other names: Anna Catharina Kernkamp-Schenck
- Known for: Painting

Anna "Anny" Kernkamp (18 June 1868 – 9 February 1947) was a Belgian artist.

== Biography ==
Anna was born on 18 June 1868 in Antwerp as Anna Catharina Schenck. There she studied with the painter Henri Rul. She went on to study with Ernest Blanc-Garin in Brussels. In 1887 she married Johann Heinrich (Henri) Kernkamp, from Edam, Netherlands. She started painting after the wedding and thus signed her work "Anny Kernkamp". As a result of her painting Anna suffered from an eye disease, which forced her to stop painting around 1913. She died on 9 February 1947 in Brasschaat.

== Work ==
Anna Kernkamp painted still lifes and landscapes in an Impressionistic style. She was a member of the Mechelen artist association "De Distel". She described her work as "open air impressionism". During her life, Anna exhibited several times, a.o. in Liège (1902), Antwerp (1904, 1908) and Athens (1904, where she received an international prize).

== Gallery ==
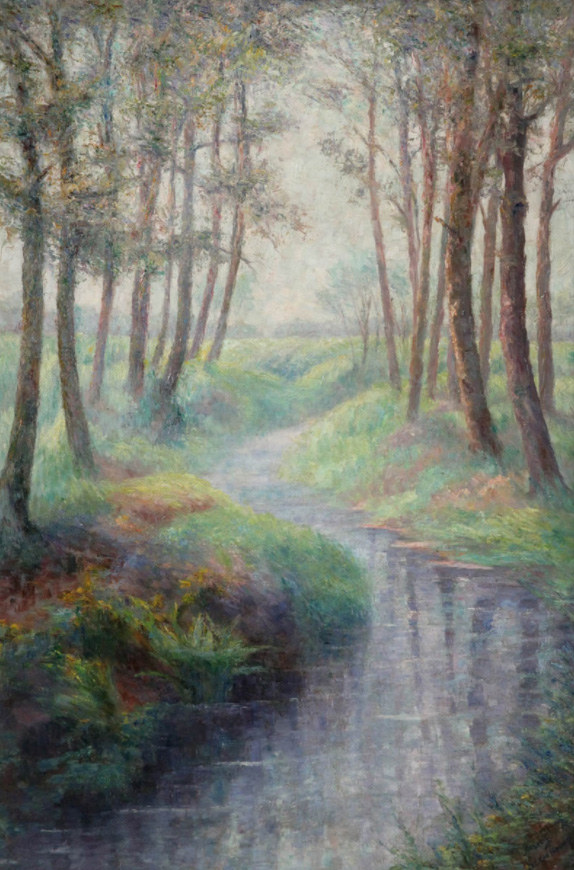
Meandering stream in the woods

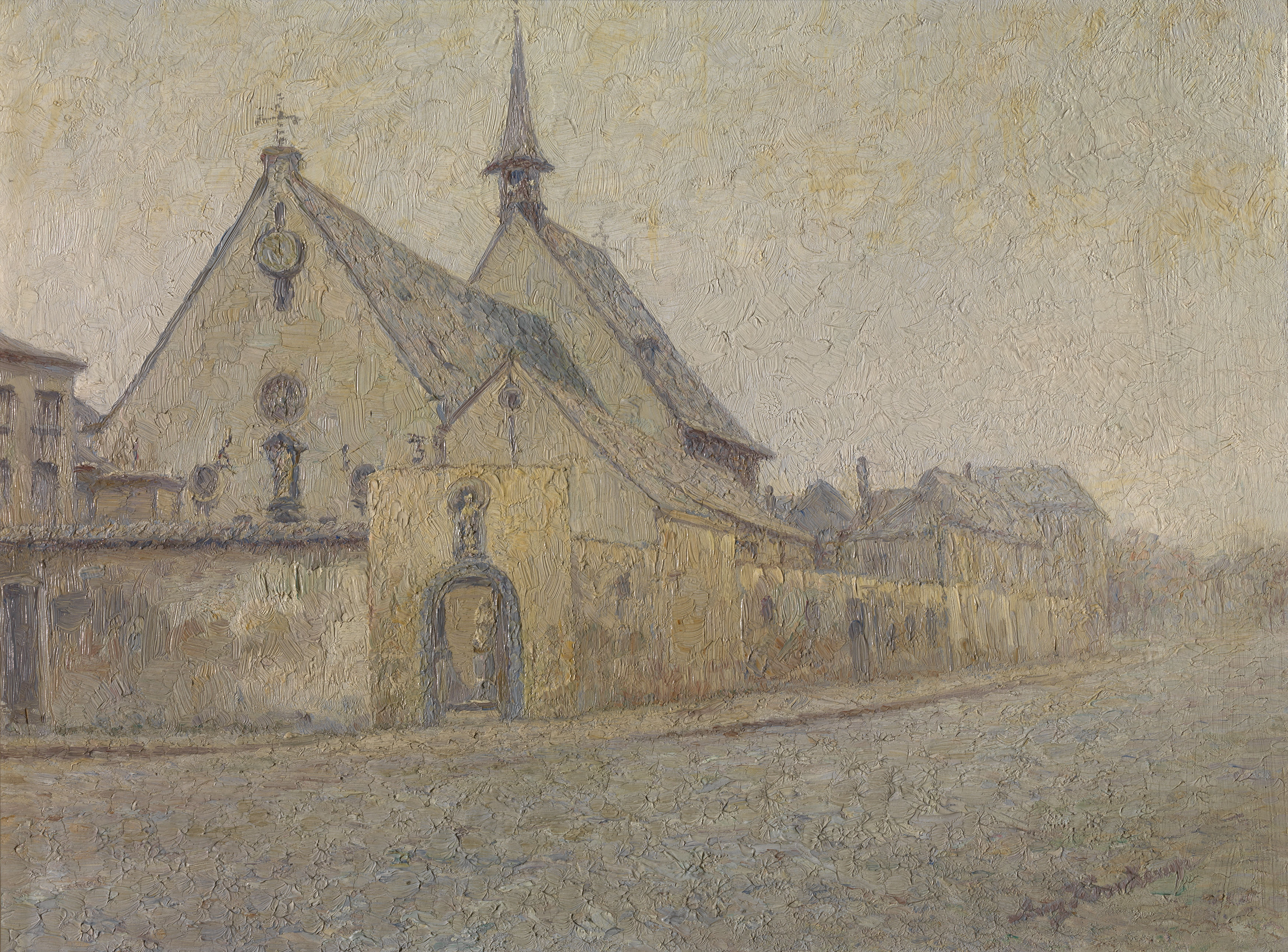
St. Anthony Church in Antwerp
