= Alice Ronner =

Belgian painter (1857–1957)

- Born: Emma Alice Henriette Ronner; 9 September 1857; Brussels, Belgium
- Died: 4 July 1957 (aged 99); Ixelles, Belgium
- Known for: Painting

Emma Alice Henriette Ronner (September 9, 1857 – July 4, 1957) was a Belgian painter.

She was born in Brussels as the daughter and pupil of Henriette Ronner-Knip, a painter famous in her day for scenes with dogs and cats. One of six children, her older brother Alfred Ronner and younger sister Emma Ronner also became notable painters.

Ronner specialized in still-life paintings of fruits and flowers. Along with her mother and sister, she became a member of the Cercle des Femmes Peintres, an artist society in Belgium set up by Berthe Art to allow women artists an organized outlet to exhibit their works. She showed works in such "women's art shows" regularly with her mother, and international shows such as the Palace of Fine Arts at the 1893 World's Columbian Exposition in Chicago, Illinois, up to the 1910 Vienna Secession.

Soon after this she joined a Brussels gallery in 1911 together with some friends from the (by then defunct) Circle of Women Painters. The gallery was called the Galerie Lyceum. The founding members were herself, her sister Emma Ronner, Anna Boch, Louise Danse, Marie Danse, Juliette Wytsman and Ketty Gilsoul-Hoppe.

Ronner died in Ixelles, Belgium.
