= Marie de Bièvre =

Belgian painter

- Born: 30 January 1865; Saint-Josse-ten-Noode, Belgium
- Died: 7 October 1940 (aged 75); Elsene, Belgium
- Known for: Painting

Marie de Bièvre (1865–1940) was a Belgian artist known for her still life painting.

== Biography ==
Bièvre was born on 30 January 1865 in Saint-Josse-ten-Noode. She help establish several artists groups including the Cercle des aquarellistes et des aquafortistes belges in 1883 (of which Alfred William Finch was a member), Voorwaerts in 1885, and the Cercle des Femmes Peintres in 1888.

Bièvre exhibited her work in the Woman's Building at the 1893 World's Columbian Exposition in Chicago, Illinois. She also exhibited at the Exposition Internationale d'Anvers, Antwerp in 1894, and the Exposition Universelle, Paris in 1900.

Bièvre died on 7 October 1940 in Elsene.

== Gallery ==
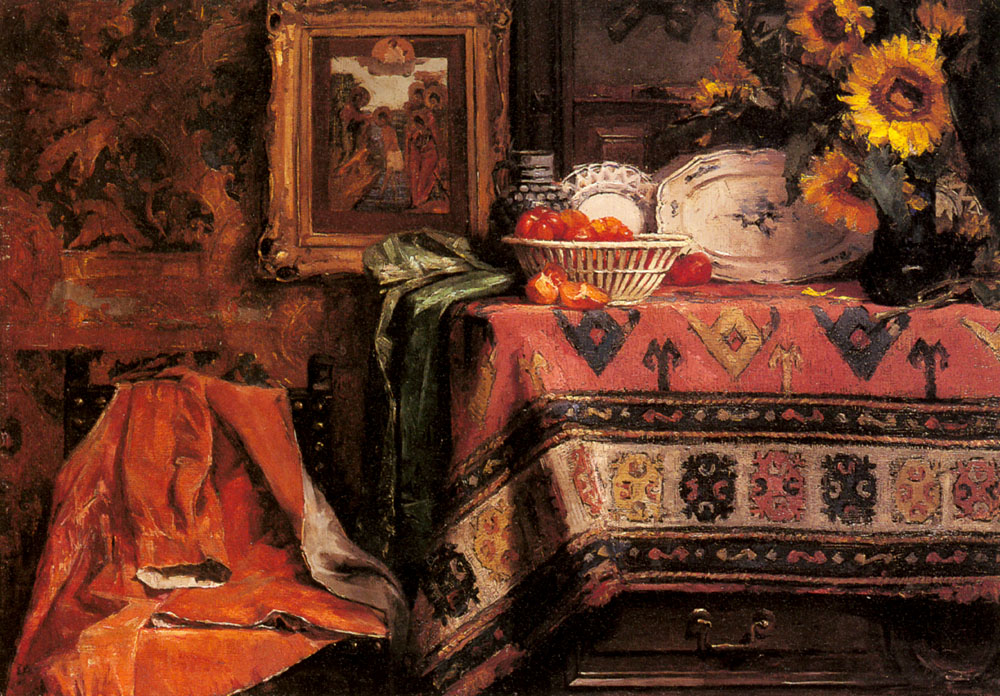
An Interior

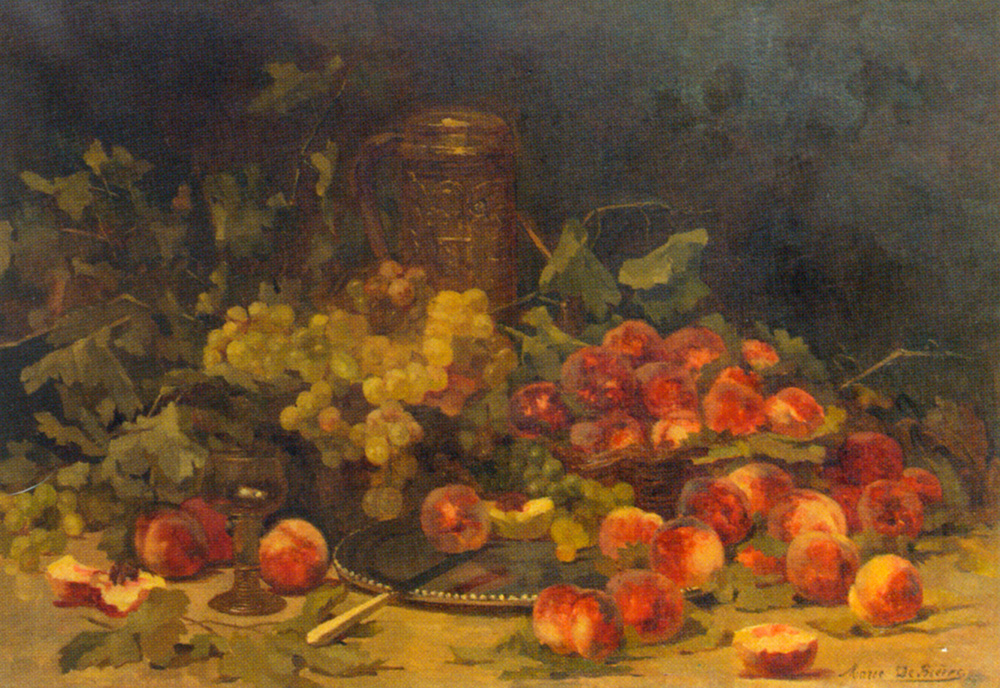
Nature morte

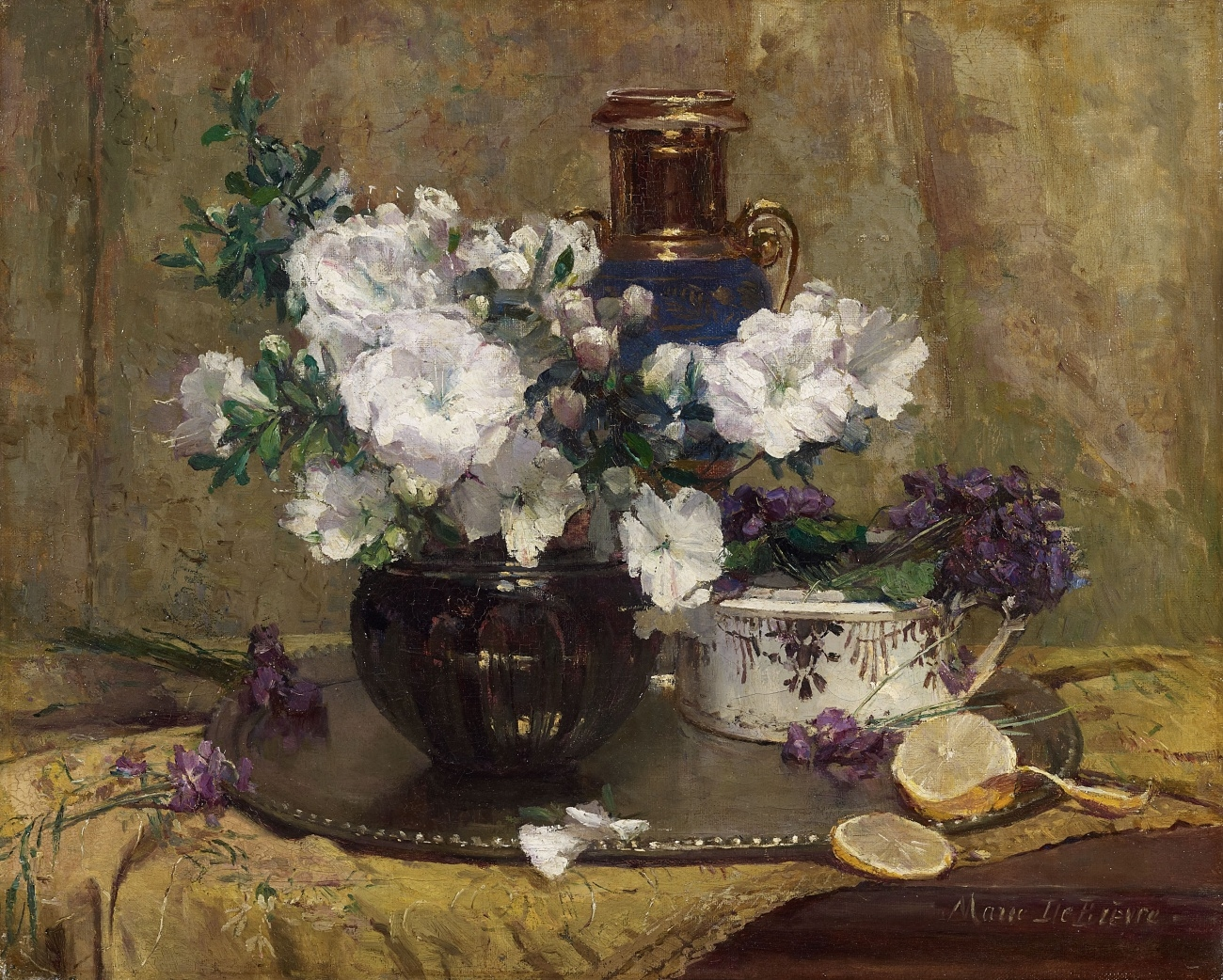
Stillleben mit Azalee
