= Barbara Elisabeth van Houten =

Dutch painter

- Born: 8 April 1863; Groningen, Netherlands
- Died: 27 May 1950 (aged 87); The Hague, Netherlands
- Known for: Painting

Barbara Elisabeth van Houten (8 April 1863 – 27 May 1950) was a Dutch painter.

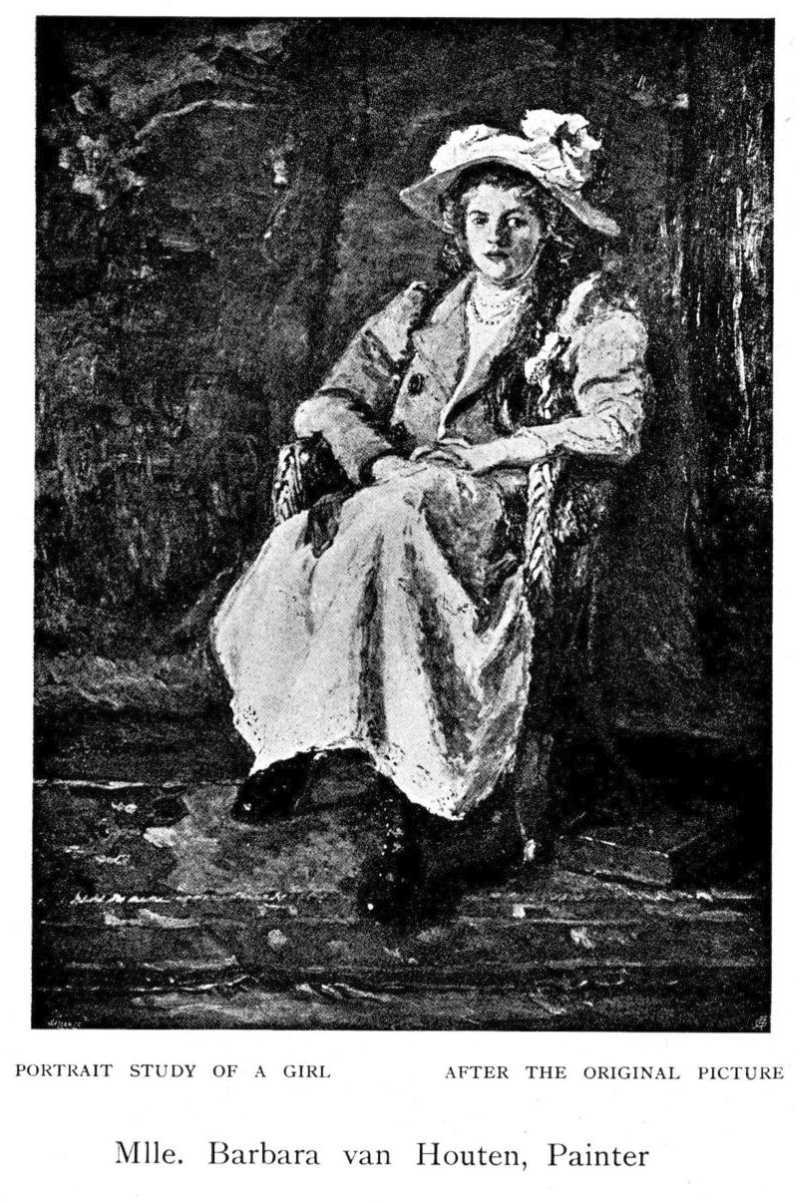
Girl in a Chair

== Biography ==
Houten was born in Groningen and studied at the École du Louvre in Paris before finishing her studies under August Allebé at the Rijksacademie voor Beeldende Kunsten in Amsterdam. She was the niece of Sientje Mesdag-van Houten who gave her advice on her studies.

Besides oil paintings she is also known for etchings and was a member of the short-lived Dutch Etcher's Club (1885-1896). Houten exhibited her work at the Palace of Fine Arts at the 1893 World's Columbian Exposition in Chicago, Illinois.

Her painting Girl in a Chair was included in the 1905 book Women Painters of the World.

Houten died in The Hague.
