= Alix d'Anethan =

Belgian painter

- Baroness
- Born: 12 November 1848; Brussels, Belgium
- Died: 11 June 1921 (age 105); Paris, France
- Father: Henri-Auguste d'Anethan
- Mother: Louise Sylvie Artain de Saint-Martin
- Occupation: Painter, Artist

Alix Apolline Louise d'Anethan (12 November 1848, Brussels – 11 June 1921, Paris) was a Belgian painter.

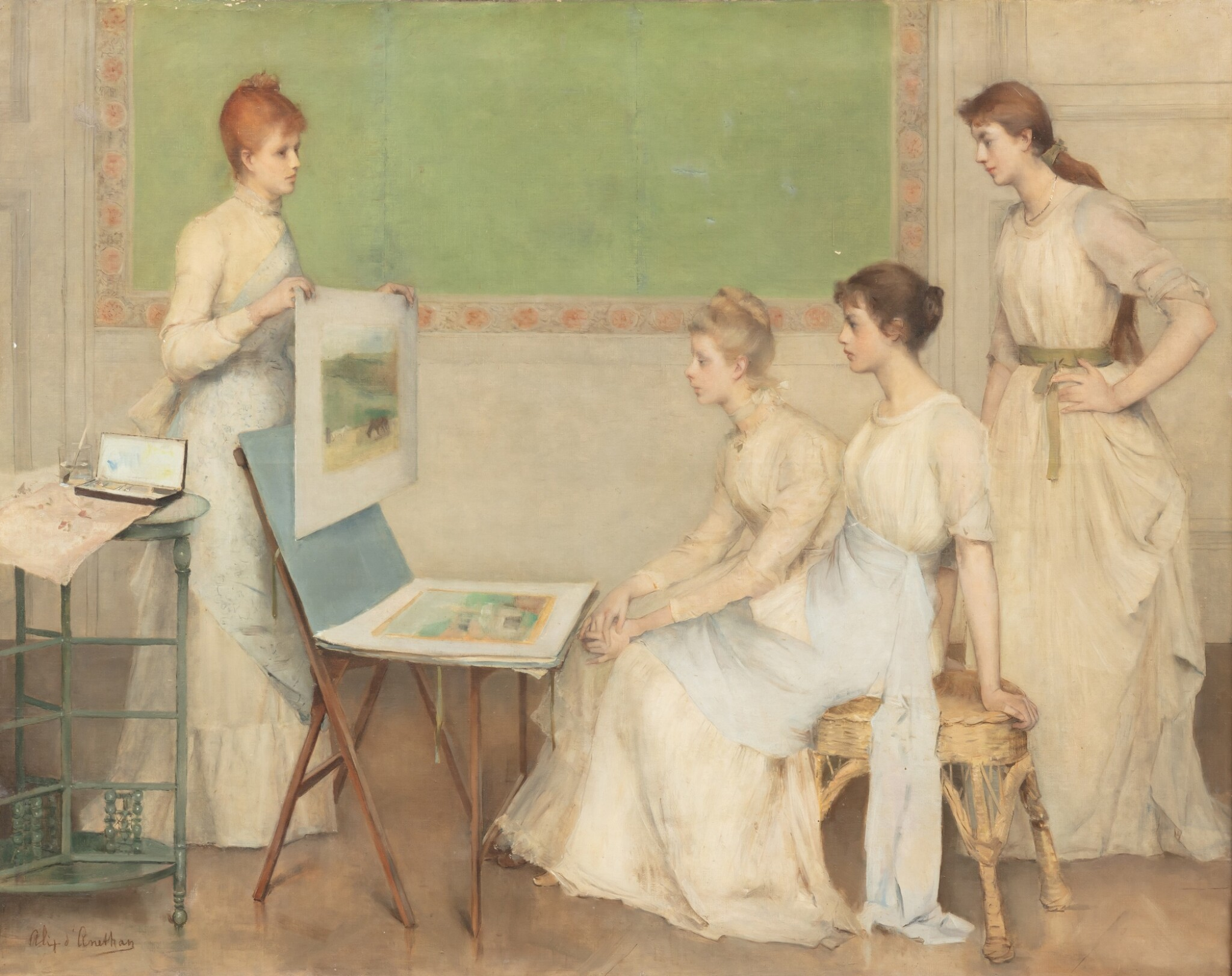
In the artist' studio

The daughter of baron Henri-Auguste d'Anethan and Louise Sylvie Artain de Saint-Martin, she was born in Brussels. She was related to the painter Louis Artan. D'Anethan moved to Paris, where she stayed with an uncle. She studied with the painters Alfred Stevens, Emile Wauters and Pierre Puvis de Chavannes. D'Anethan painted a number of notable murals, including one for the chapel in the Hôpital Cochin in Paris and three for a church in Boffres. She participated in shows in Brussels, Antwerp and Paris. D'Anethan was a member of a group of women painters in Brussels known as the Cercle des femmes peintres.

She died in Paris at the age of 72.

Her work is included in the collections of museums in Tournai, Brussels, Ghent and Antwerp, as well as at the city hall in Bruges.
