= Union of Women Painters and Sculptors =

The Union of Women Painters and Sculptors (French: Union des Femmes Peintres et Sculpteurs, or UFPS) was founded in 1881 in Paris as a society for the promotion of female artists. The Union was founded by sculptor and educator Hélène Bertaux (Mme. Leon Bertaux) and had as many as 450 members at its peak. Noted members include Virginie Demont-Breton, who became president after Bertaux in 1894, and artist Marie Bashkirtseff.

== History ==
Opportunities for women within the Parisian art world in the 19th century were limited. The influential École des Beaux-Arts did not begin admitting women until 1896. The first female student admitted to Beaux-Arts de Paris was artist Fanny Rozet, who was able to attend the school in 1896 after the UFPS demanded her allowance.

Prior to 1896, the only state-sponsored option for women’s art education was the National School of Drawing for Young Women (École Nationale de Dessin pour les Jeune Filles), which received less funding than men’s schools. Additionally, women were prohibited from joining many other existing exhibition groups, schools, and public art spaces.

The Union’s goals were to create a community to educate and support female artists and by displaying their work. They published the Journal des femmes artistes newsletter, where members of the Union could communicate and comment. They also founded and organized the annual Salon des Femmes as an exhibition of women’s art exclusively. The Salon was intended to be a non-traditional and non-hierarchical exhibition, including decorative arts and giving new and established artists equal access to preferred hanging spaces. The first Salon des Femmes occurred in January 1882, and the Union continued to organize and publicize the event each year. At the 1896 Salon des Femmes, 295 women exhibited their work. In addition to these efforts, members of the Union, especially Bertaux, campaigned for women’s entry into the Ecole des Beaux-Arts and for their eligibility to compete for the Prix de Rome art prize.

== Members ==
- Camille Berlin
- Virginie Demont-Breton
- Félicie Ransy-Putzeys
- Gerda Sutton
- Nelly Trumel
