= Marie Heijermans =

Dutch painter (1859–1937)

Marie de Roode-Heijermans
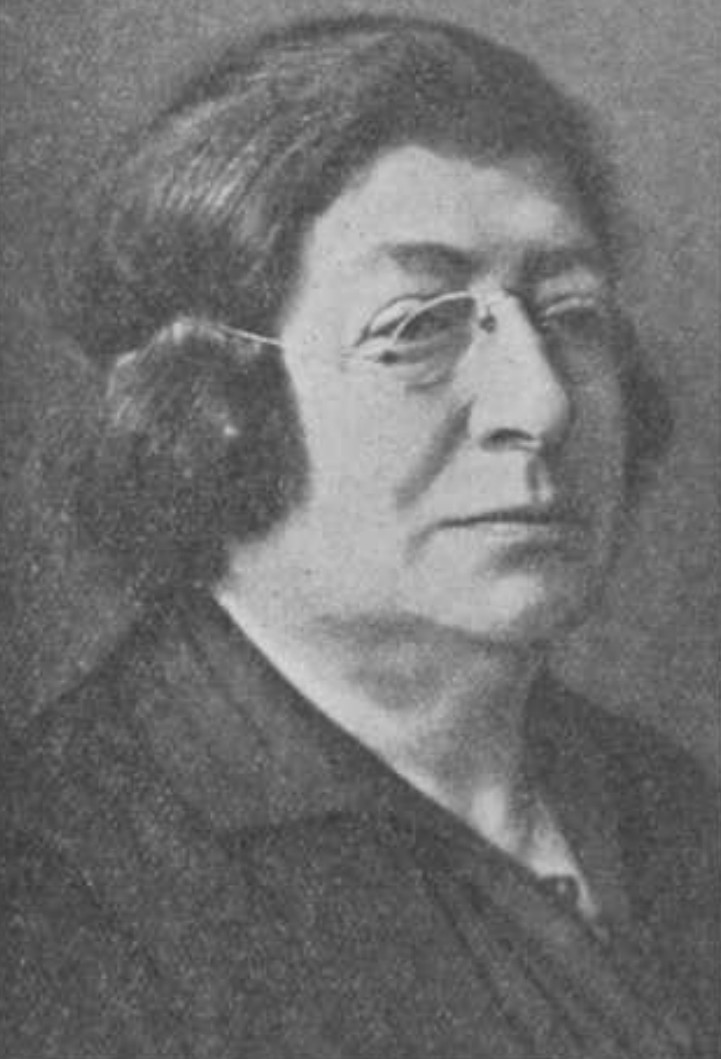
- Born: Marie Heijermans; 14 October 1859; Rotterdam, Netherlands
- Died: 26 October 1937 (aged 78); Amsterdam, Netherlands
- Other names: Catherine Mariam de Roode-Heijermans
- Known for: Painting
- Spouse: Justus Johannes de Roode (m. 1899)

Marie Heijermans or Marie de Roode-Heijermans (1859-1937) was a Dutch painter.

== Biography ==
Heijermans was born on 14 October 1859 in Rotterdam, Netherlands. Among her ten siblings were educator Ida Heijermans, writer Herman Heijermans and community physician Louis Heiermans. She studied at the Koninklijke Academie van Beeldende Kunsten (Royal Academy of Art, The Hague) and Academie voor Beeldende Kunsten Academy of Visual Arts, Rotterdam. One of her teachers was Jan Philip Koelman. She also studied with included Ernest Blanc-Garin in Brussels. She was a member of Cercle des Femmes Peintres, a society for women artists. Sal Meijer was a pupil of hers.

While in Brussels Heijermans achieved success at the Paris Salon. She subsequently painted Victime de la misère depicting a nude woman, a clothed man, and chair with a bank note placed on it. The image was censored by the Belgian king and removed from an exhibition. The scandal resulted in the premature ending of her three-year work grant from the Belgian Queen Regent. The painting was purchased in the late 1920s by the Stedelijk Museum where it caused a new scandal having been purchased by taxpayer's money. It was removed from view.

In 1899 she married the journalist and fellow socialist Justus Johannes de Roode (1865-1945). The couple resided in Amsterdam. Heijermans was a member of the Social Democratic Workers' Party (Netherlands) and was interested in bringing art to the people. She was a board member of the Kunst aan het Volk. In 1919 the Stedelijk Museum Amsterdam held a retrospective of her work.

From 1920 through 1926 Heijermans lived in Geneva with her husband, who was then working for the International Labour Organization.

Heijermans died on 26 October 1937 in Amsterdam.

In 1993 the Vakbondsmuseum (Trade Unions Museum) in Amsterdam held an exhibition of her work Een vergeten vrouw. De kunstenares Marie de Roode-Heijermans which included the controversial Victime de la misère.

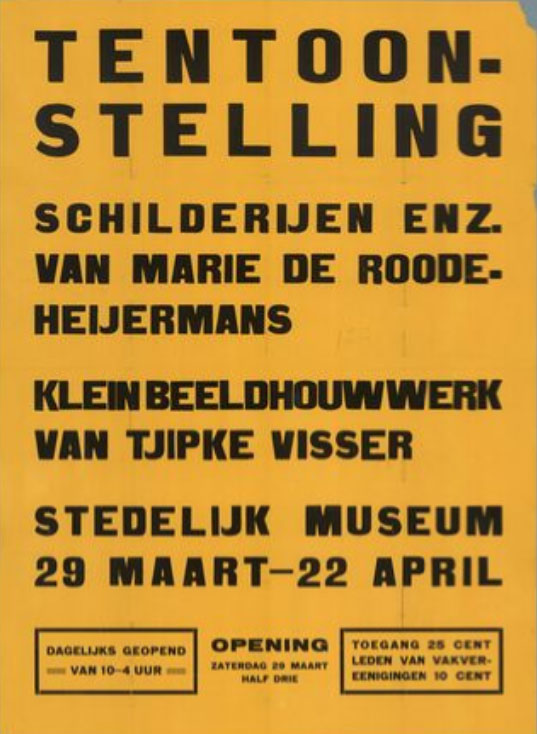
Poster for Stedelijk Museum 1919

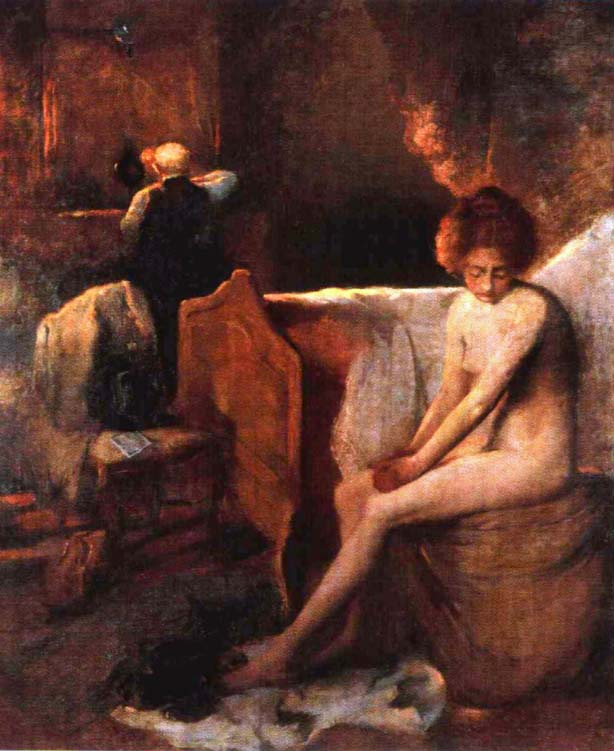
Marie Heijermans - Victime de la misère
