= Henriette Knip =

Henriëtte Knip may refer to

- Henriëtte Geertruida Knip, Dutch flower painter
- Henriëtte Ronner-Knip, Dutch painter and her niece
