= Jacques Barraband =

French zoological and botanical illustrator

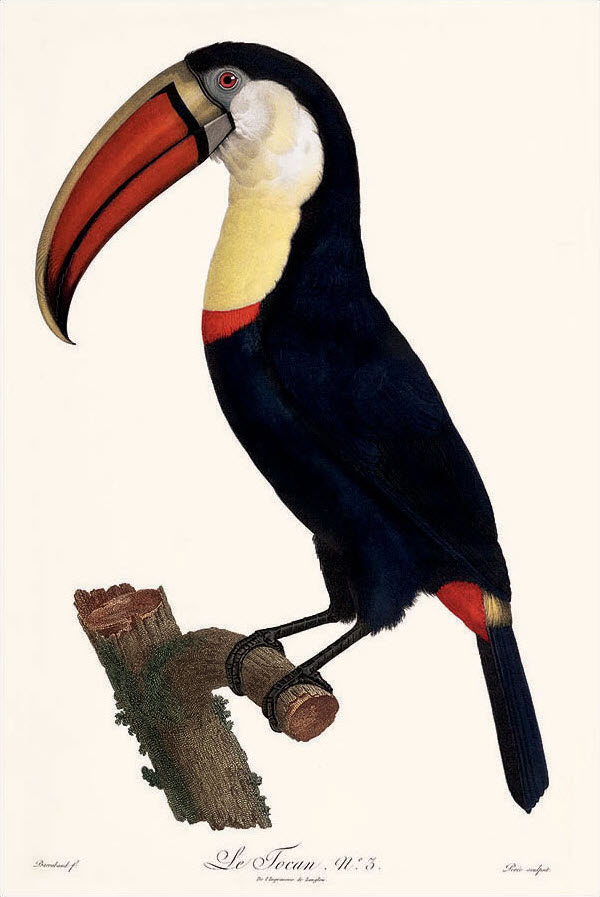
Le Tocan (toucan) by Jacques Barraband

Jacques Barraband (or Pierre-Paul Barraband) (1767? (baptized 1768), Aubusson (Creuse), France–1 October 1809, Lyon) was a French zoological and botanical illustrator, renowned for his lifelike renderings of tropical birds. His pictures were based on mounted specimens and his illustrations were considered the most accurate ones made during the early 1800s.

== Biography ==
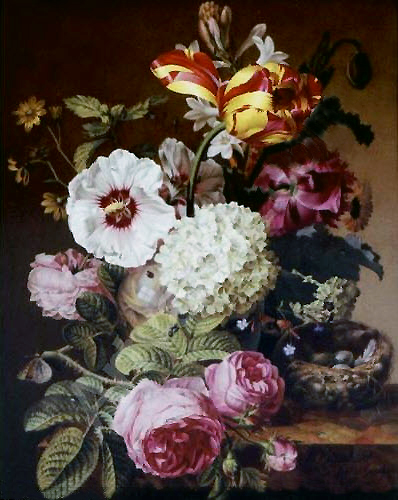
Still life on porcelain by Jacques Barraband, 1797

Barraband was born to Jacques Barraband and Marie-Anne Bebit in 1767 (or 1768) and was baptized on August 31, 1768, at the church of Sainte-Croix in Aubusson. His father worked in the local tapestry factory and the son also worked there briefly after studying art at the local school, which was famed for producing several artists of note, including Francis Roby de Faureix and Etienne de La Seiglière de La Cour. In 1784 or 1785 he moved to Paris, working at tapestry and carpet stores on rue de la Huchette and studying art at l’Academie royale de peinture under Joseph-Laurent Malaine, at the Gobelins Manufactory. During the French exposition of 1798, he produced some paintings for the carpet manufacturers Gobelins and Savonnerie and for the porcelain makers Dihl and Gerhard. He also made illustrations of insects for the French naturalist Sonnini and illustrated a book by Fournier on Egypt. He then produced a series of watercolours of birds and flowers between 1801 and 1804 by direct commission of Napoleon Bonaparte. Among his most famous works are those he made to illustrate François Le Vaillant's scientific studies on parrots (perroquets), birds of paradise (oiseaux de paradis), rollers (rolliers), toucans (toucans), barbets (barbus), sugarbirds (promerops), bee-eaters (guêpiers), trogons (couroucous), and turacos (touracos). One of his students was Pauline Rifer de Courcelles who later married the artist Joseph August Knip. Pauline de Courcelles illustrated the birds in Histoire Naturelle de Tangaras, des Manakins et des Todiers by Anselme-Gaetan Desmarest (1805).

Napoleon I hired Barraband to decorate the banquet hall at St. Cloud.

He was appointed a professor at the school of Arts et Dessin de Lyon in 1807 and died two years later. His only daughter Adeline became a musician.

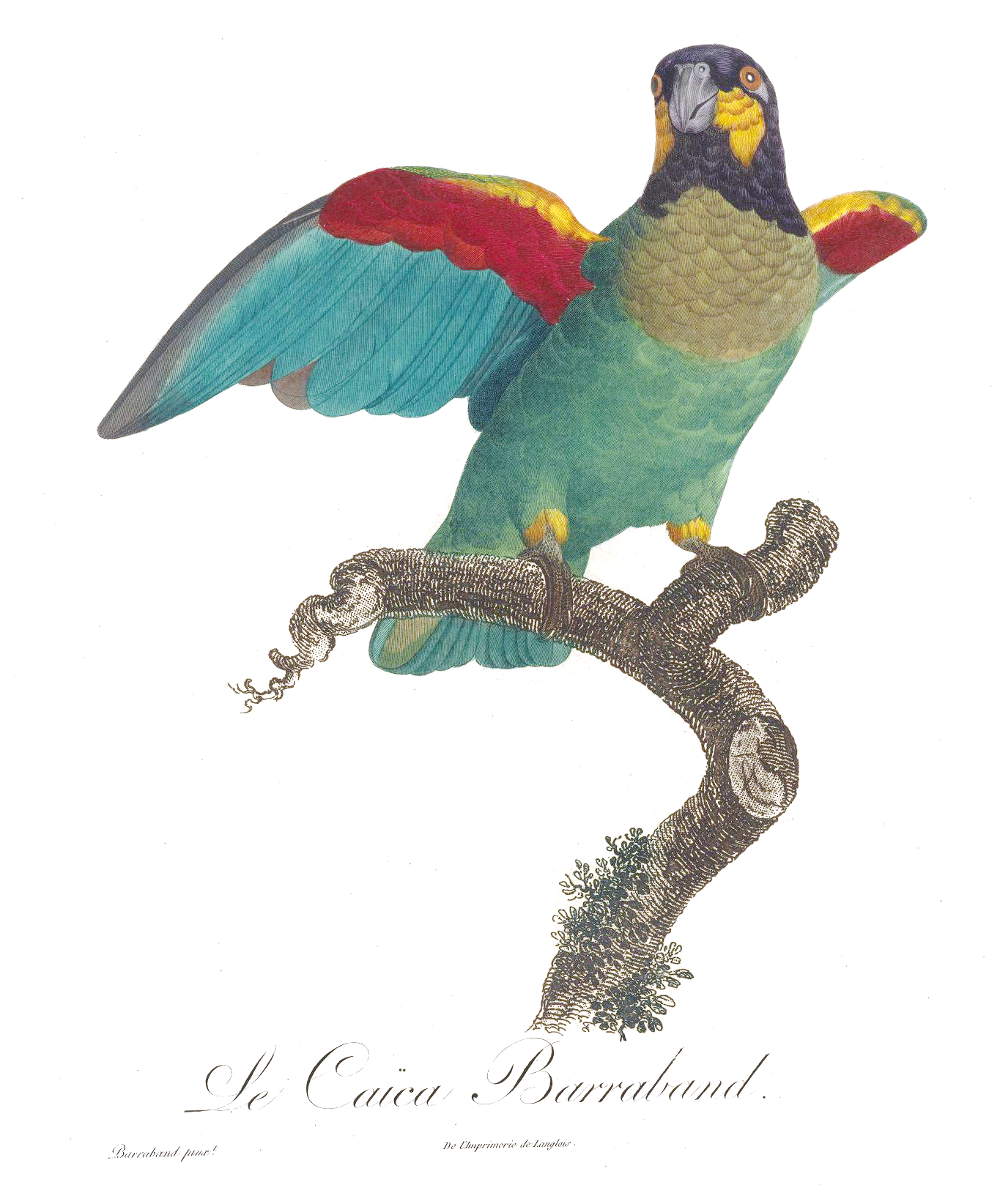
Francois Levaillant named the orange-cheeked parrot (Pyrilia barrabandi) after Barraband

Works illustrated by Barraband for Le Vaillant include:

- Histoire naturelle des perroquets, Paris Levrault, Schoell & Cie, An IX-XII (1801–1805), 2 volumes. vol. 1 , vol. 2
- Histoire naturelle des oiseaux de paradis et des rolliers, suivie de celles des toucans et des barbus, Paris, Denné le jeune & Perlet, (1801–1806), 2 volumes.
- Histoire naturelle des promérops et des guêpiers (et des couroucous et touracos, faisant suite à celle des oiseaux de paradis), Paris Levrault, (1806) 1807, (1816 ou 1818) 3 volumes.

Barraband worked with Louis Bouquet and Langlois to create the engravings of birds. These plates were inked, à la poupée, that is the plate had different parts inked as needed and pressed to paper just once. Tone and shading corrections were done to the plates by hand.

A monument was erected in his memory at the Lyons cemetery by his students.

== Gallery ==
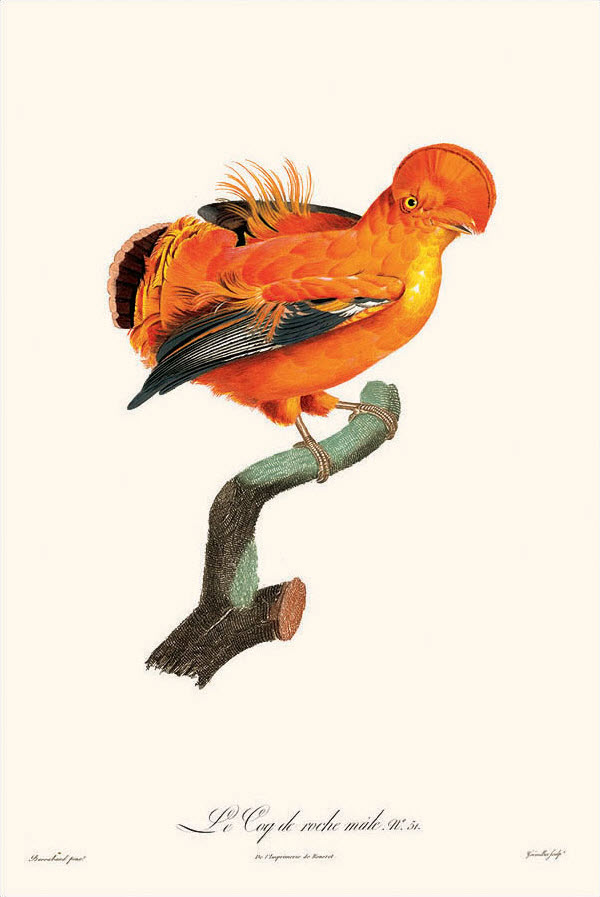
Le Coq de roche, mâle

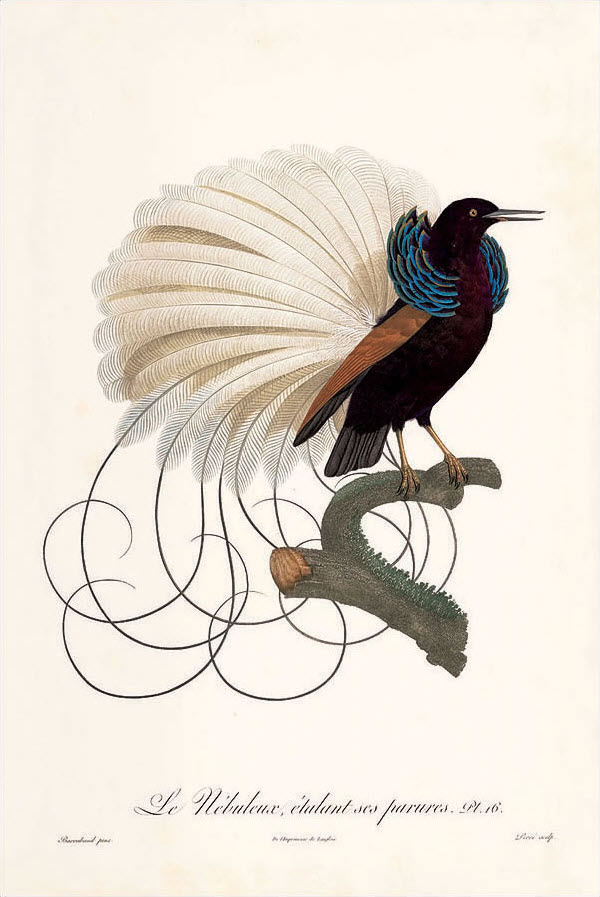
Le Nébuleux étalant ses parures

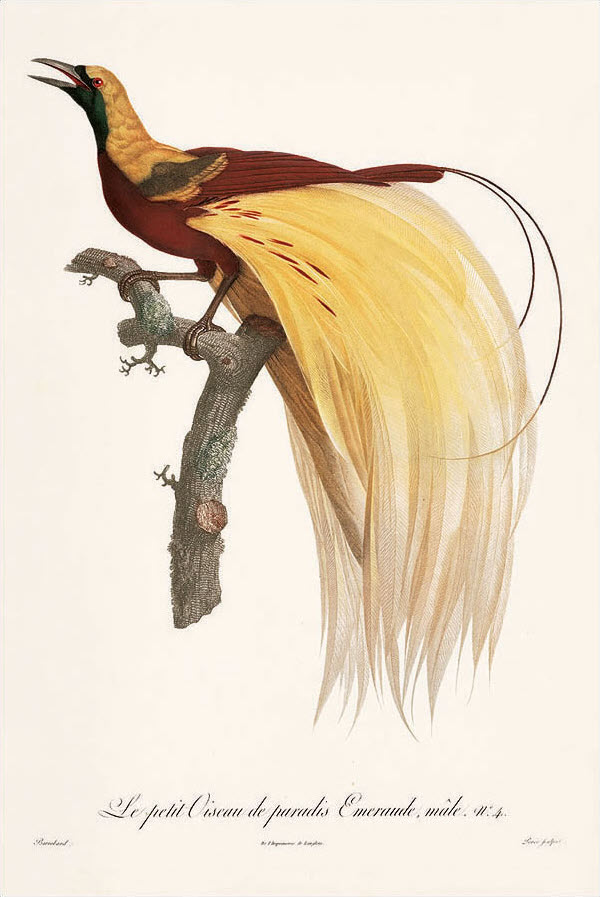
Le petit Oiseau de paradis Emeraude, mâle

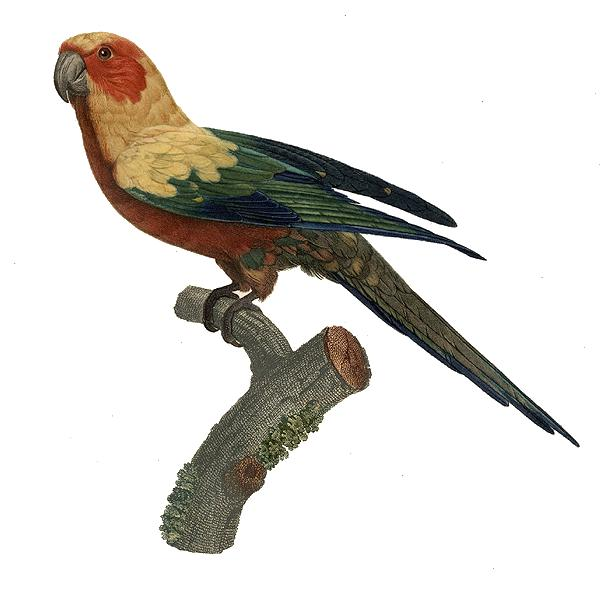
Aratinga solstitialis
