= Pauline Rifer de Courcelles =

French bird artist (1781–1851)

Pauline Knip
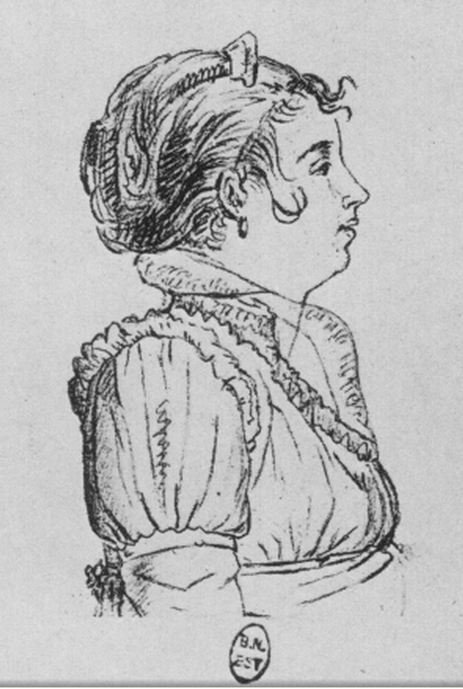
- Profile sketch by Joseph Knip from the Bibliothèque nationale de France
- Born: Pauline Rifer de Courcelles; 29 July 1781; Paris, France
- Died: 18 April 1851 (aged 69); Paris, France
- Known for: Painting
- Movement: Bird Painting
- Spouse: Joseph August Knip (m. 1808–1824)

Pauline Knip (née Pauline Rifer de Courcelles) (26 July 1781 – 18 April 1851) was a French bird artist. Her paintings of birds, particularly pigeons, were used in Coenraad Jacob Temminck's multi-part work Histoire Naturelle des Pigeons et des Gallinaces. She altered parts nine and later of this multipart work, retitling it to Les Pigeons by Madame Knip with Temminck only being author of the text. She sent a copy to Temminck that was not tampered with.

== Early and personal life ==
Antoinette Pauline Jacqueline Rifer de Courcelles was born on 26 July 1781 in Paris. Her father was a senior navy officer. She met Joseph August Knip, a student of Van Spaendonck, at Jacques Barraband's studio, and they were married in 1808. She took Knip's surname, but they later divorced in 1824. She was sister in law of floral artist Henriëtte Geertruida Knip and the step-mother of Dutch artist Henriëtte Ronner-Knip through this relationship.

== Career ==
Knip studied art under Jacques Barraband and exhibited her watercolours and pen illustrations at the 1808, 1810, 1812 and 1814 salons. In 1810, Knip was won a gold medal and was awarded lodgings at the Sorbonne as a prize for her work.

Knip's paintings of birds, particularly the pigeons, were used in Coenraad Jacob Temminck's multi-part work Histoire Naturelle des Pigeons et des Gallinaces. Knip altered parts nine and later of the multipart work, retitling it to Les Pigeons by Madame Knip, with Temminck only credited as author of the text. She sent a copy to Temminck that had not been tampered with.

The alterations to the title of the work have led to problems in taxonomy: how the authors are to be cited for species described in them and the dates of publication to be considered (especially when applying the principle of priority in the International Code of Zoological Nomenclature). When the work was being prepared, Temminck lived in Holland and Knip lived in Paris and was relied upon to supervise the engraving and printing. Knip was a friend of Marie Louise, Duchess of Parma, the wife of Napoleon Bonaparte, and had royal patronage. Temminck discovered the alterations only after 1812 and found that he could not complain about the piracy because of her powerful friends. He however added a note on the matter at the end of the third and last volume of his 1815 work Histoire naturelle générale des pigeons et des gallinacés.

== Death and legacy ==
Pauline Knip died in Paris on 18 April 1851.

Knip's work has become very collectable, reaching significant prices at auction.

== Gallery ==
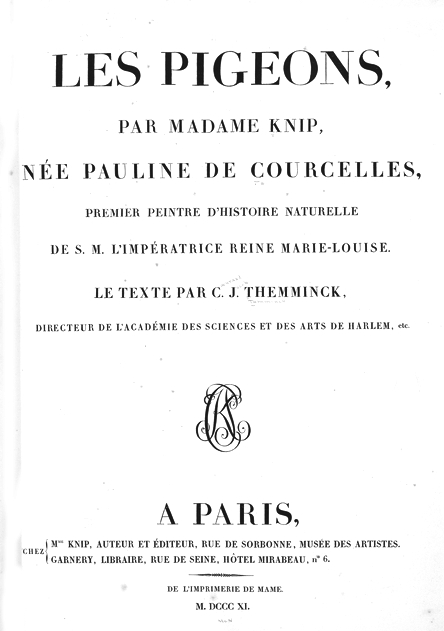
Cover page of Les Pigeons by Madame Knip. (1811) The cover is altered from C.J. Temminck's original work

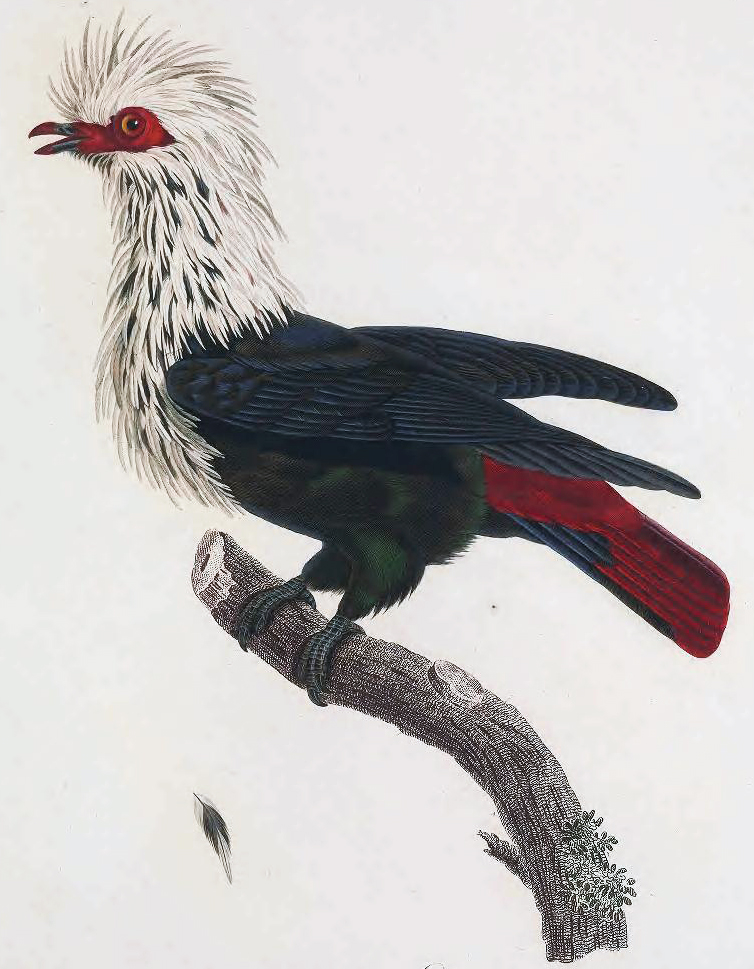
Illustration of the extinct Mauritius blue pigeon, Plate No. 19, from Les Pigeons (1811)

Illustration of the Crimson-crowned fruit dove, Plate No. 35, from Les Pigeons (1811)

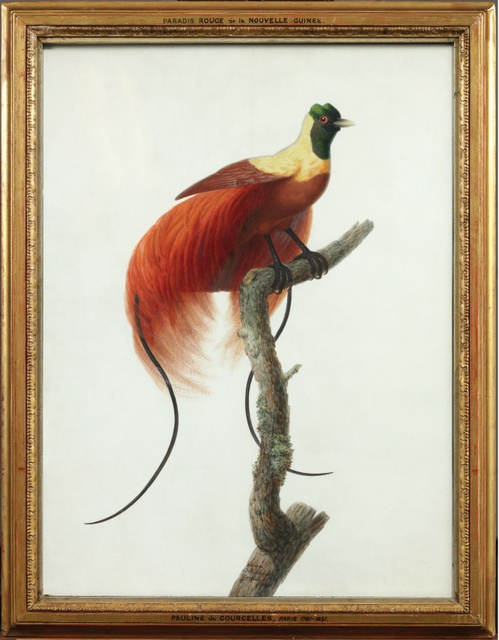
Pauline Knip de Courcelles. Bird of paradise (Uranornis rubra) on a branch, 1811. Transparent and opaque watercolour on parchment, 60 x 45 cm

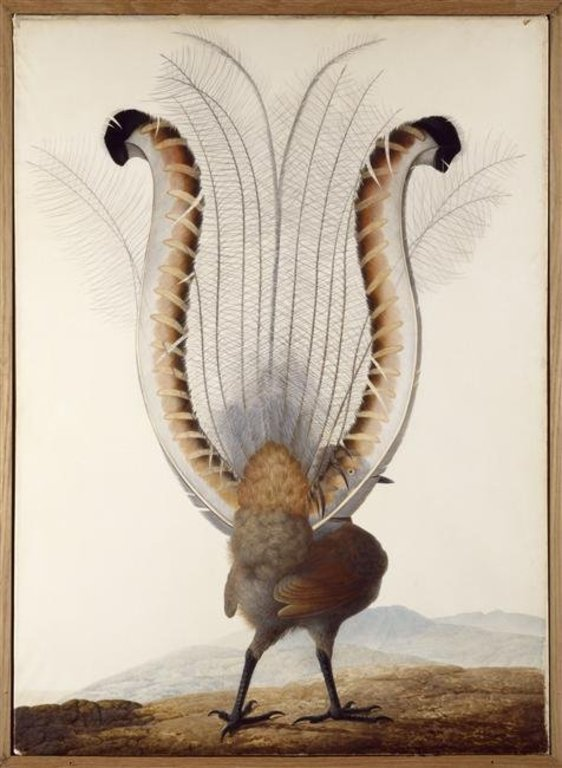
Lyrebird, 1812 Watercolour and gouache on woven paper

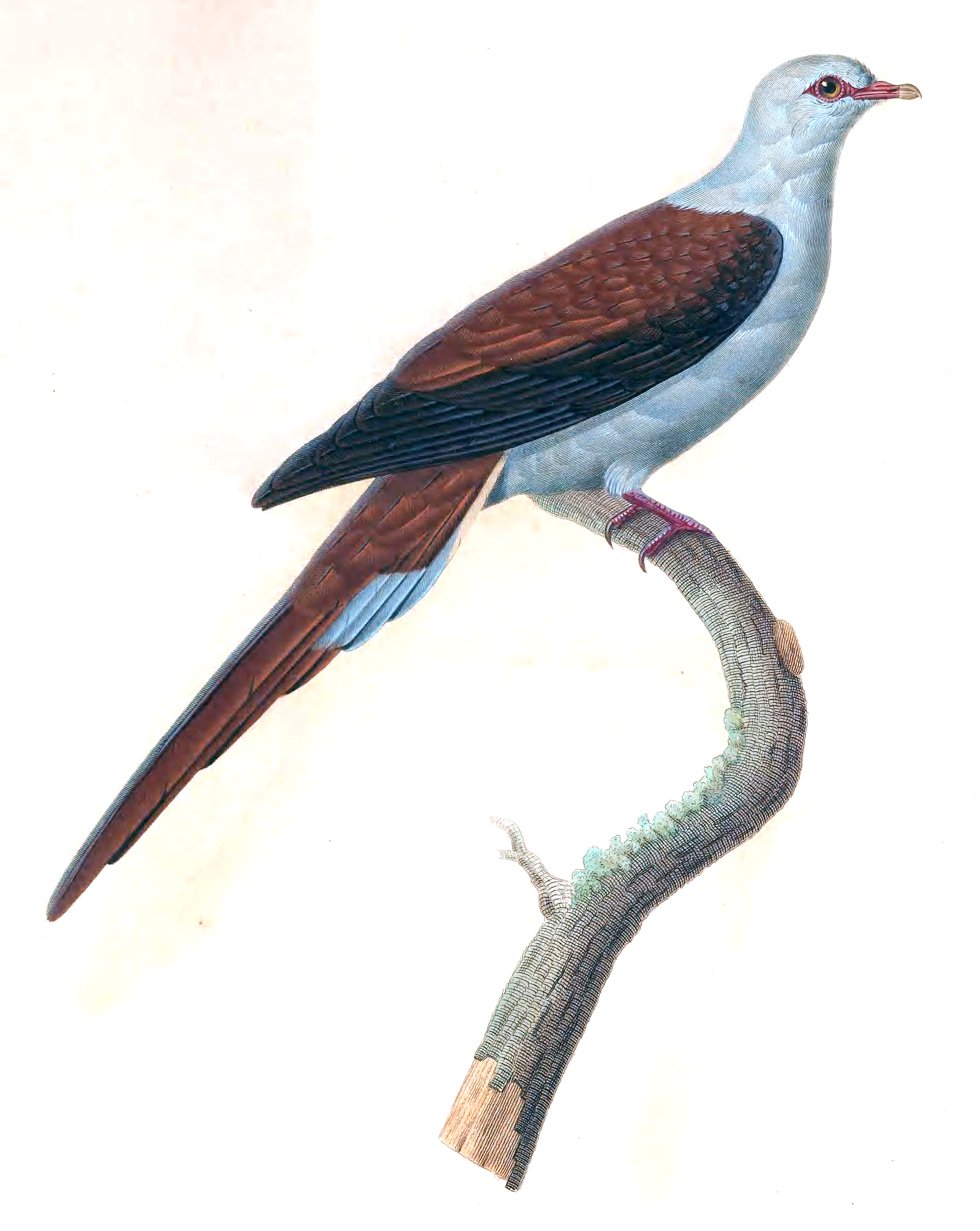
Illustration of Reinwardtoena reinwardti. From: Les Pigeons (Paris 1838–1845)

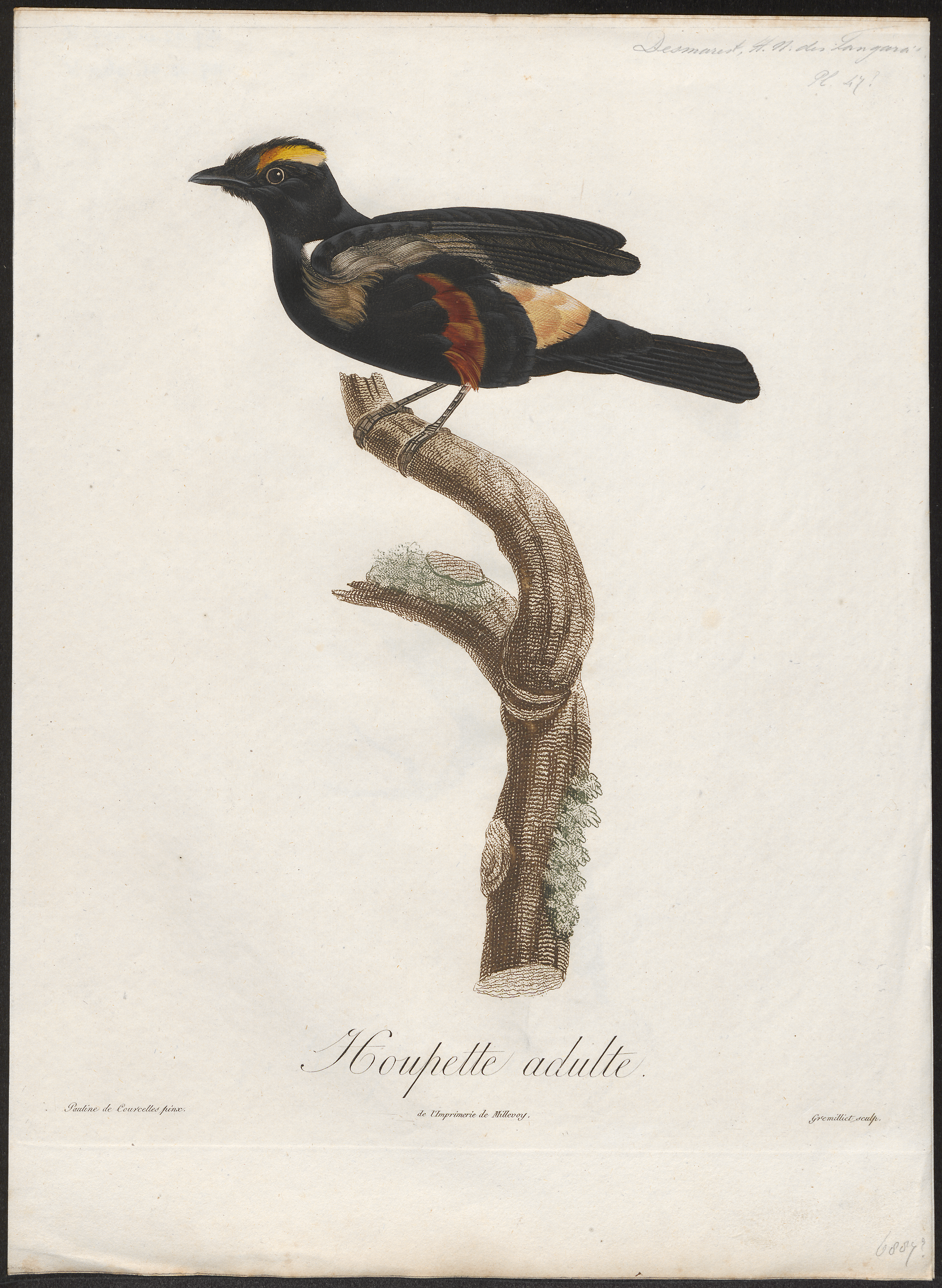
Tachyphonus cristatus 1805 Print - Iconographia Zoologica - Special Collections University of Amsterdam
