= David Col =

Belgian painter

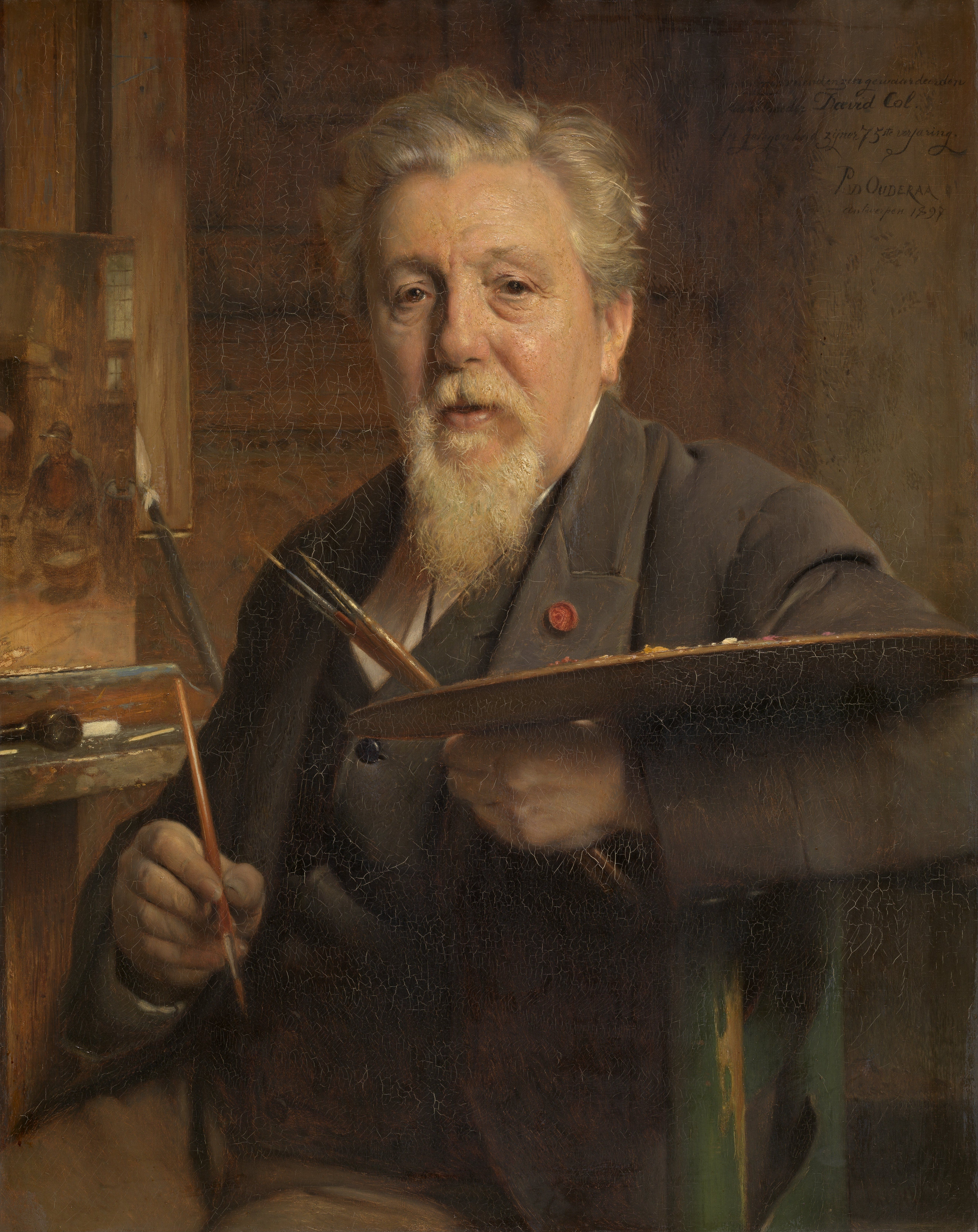
David Col; portrait by Pierre Jean van der Ouderaa (1897)

Jan David Col (6 April 1822 – 19 February 1900) was a Belgian painter known for his anecdotal genre scenes.

== Life and work ==
He was born in Antwerp and received his initial artistic training at the Royal Academy of Fine Arts in Antwerp with Nicaise De Keyser. His first solo exhibition came in 1846, and he gained immediately popularity with his mildly humorous scenes from daily life. His early works show the strong influence of Jean-Baptiste Madou and, especially, Ferdinand de Braekeleer.

He often collaborated with other artists, such as Constant Boon (1830–1882), who also did genre scenes, Eugène Remy Maes, who painted farm animals (primarily chickens) and Henriëtte Ronner-Knip, who specialized in cats.

Col died in 1900 in Antwerp. His works may be seen in the Royal Museum of Fine Arts Antwerp and the Groeningemuseum in Bruges, as well as at various museums in Brussels, Chicago, Cincinnati, Montreal and Rostock. His paintings are still regularly sold at auction.

== Selected paintings ==
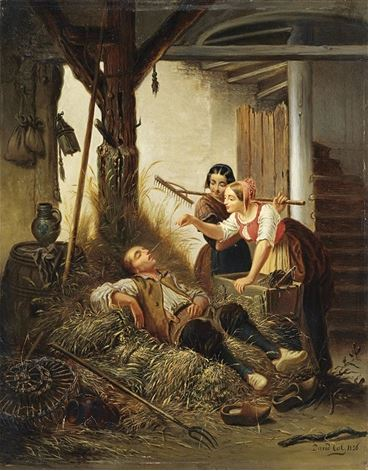
A Sleeping Shepherd and Two Young Women

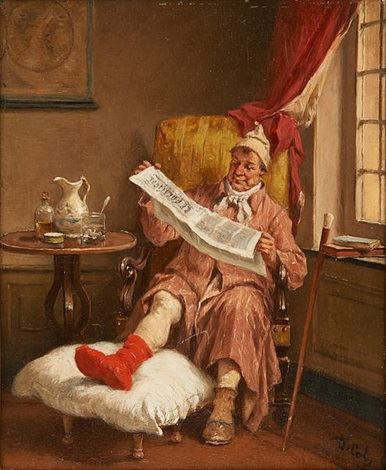
A Man with the Gout

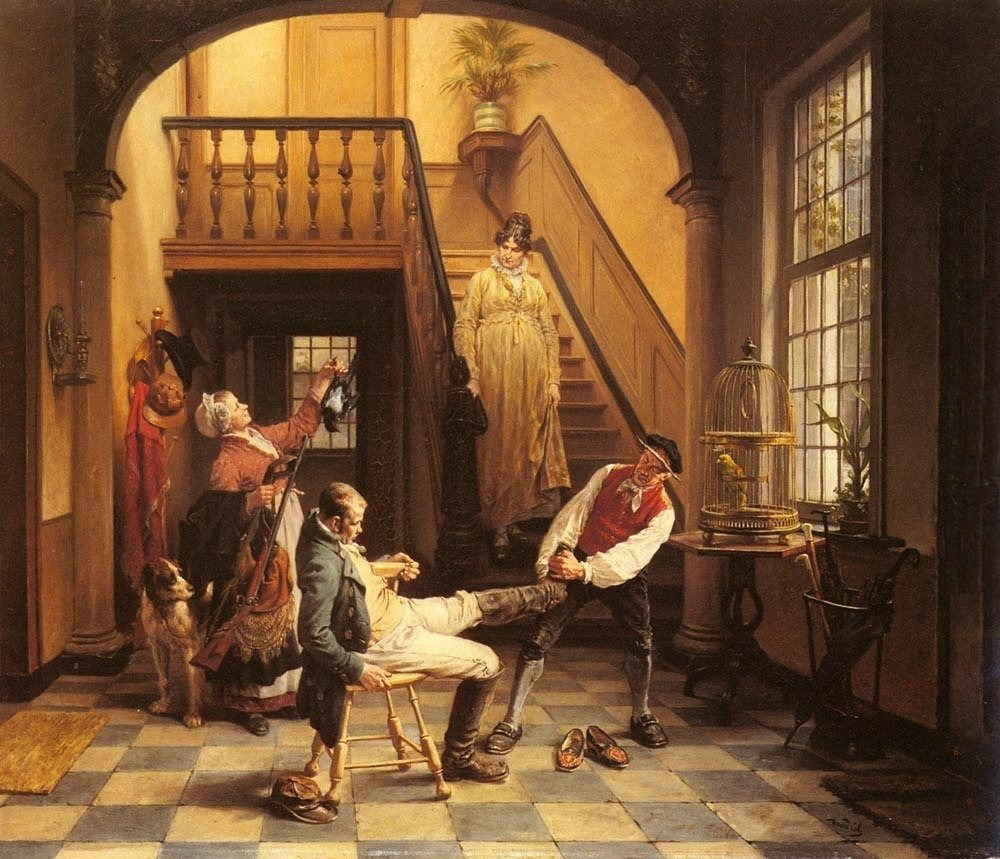
After the Hunt

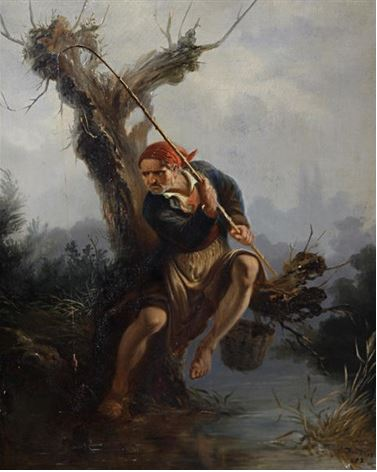
The Fisherman

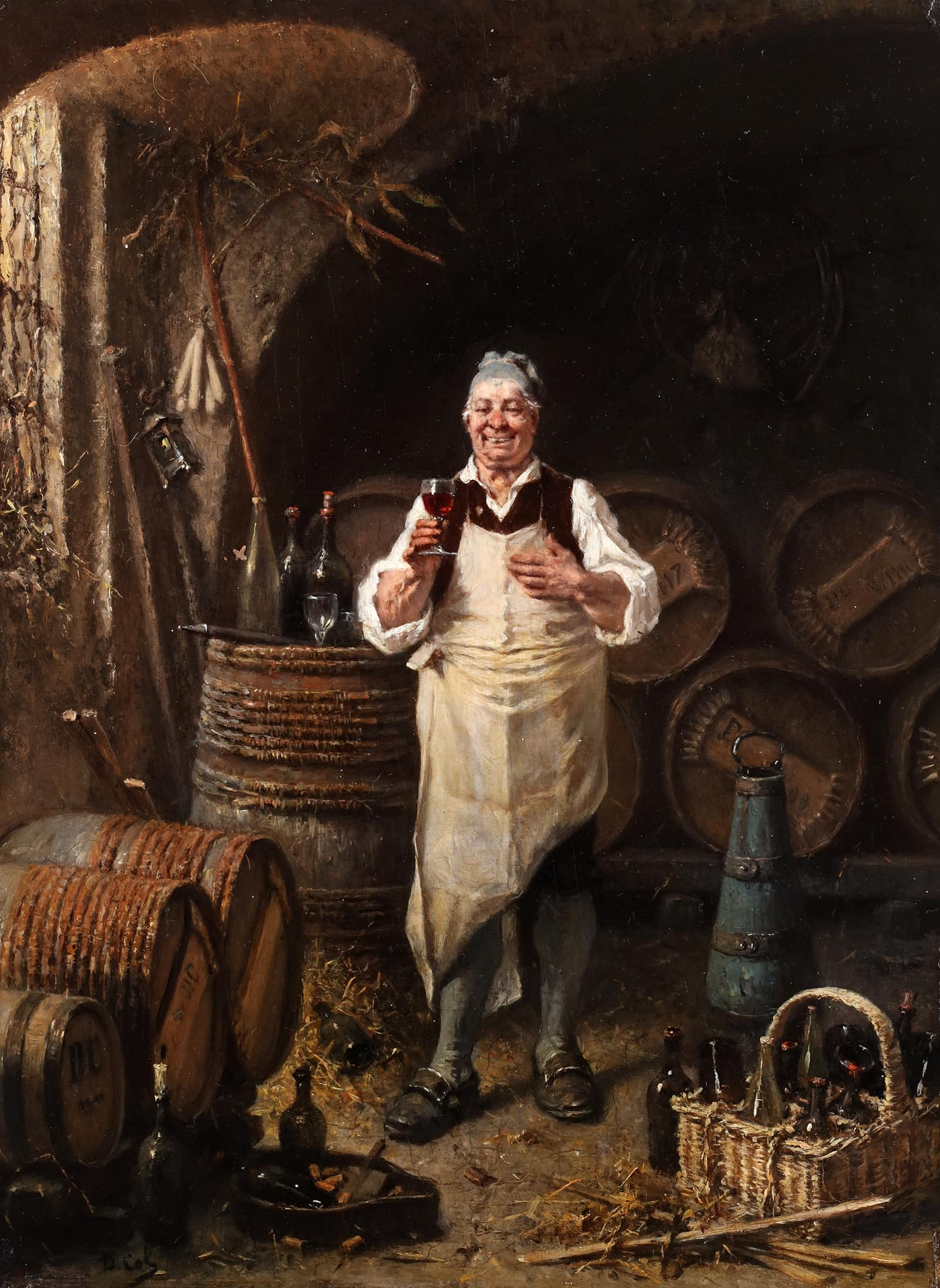
A votre santé (Belgian collection)

== Sources ==
- Berko, P. & V.: Dictionnaire des peintres belges nées entre 1750 et 1875, Editions Laconti, Brussels, 1981
