= Alfred Ronner =

Belgian painter, graphic artist and illustrator

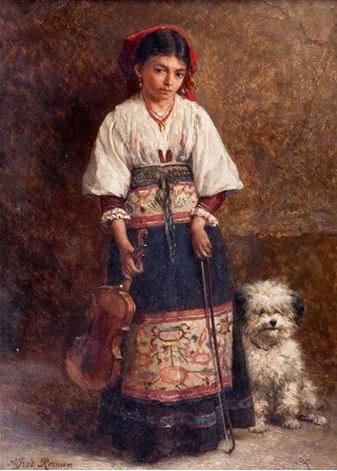
The Violinist

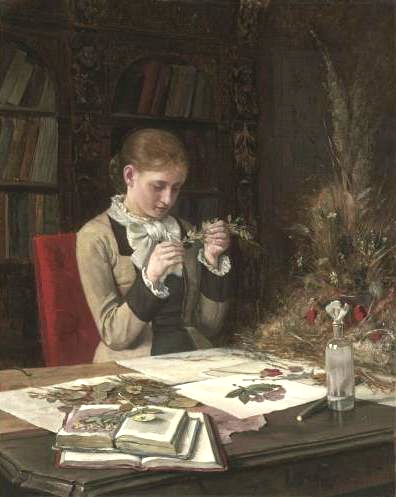
The Botanist, on display at Vassar College

Alfred Ronner (10 December 1851, in Saint-Josse-ten-Noode – 22 October 1901, in Ixelles) was a Belgian painter, graphic artist and illustrator.

== Biography ==
His mother was the animal painter, Henriëtte Ronner-Knip. He grew up in an artistic environment. Several uncles, aunts, cousins and other relatives were painters of varying proficiency; professional and amateur. His mother gave him his first lessons and his sisters, Alice and Emma also became painters.

From 1868 to 1879, he studied at the Académie Royale des Beaux-Arts in Brussels. After graduating, he chose to become a genre and portrait painter, rather than focus on animals and still-lifes like his other family members. Although he participated in numerous salons, he never became as popular or familiar as they did. He took a few students, notably Marcel Jefferys.

In 1880, he participated in the Belgian Prix de Rome, but did not advance past the preliminary stages. Eventually, he abandoned painting, because the turpentine fumes irritated his weak lungs, and focused entirely on book illustration.

Following his father's death in 1883, he took over managing his mother's business interests; selling and arranging exhibitions for her paintings. He remained unmarried and, for much of his life, lived with his family. In his last few years, he lived independently, but returned home to die.

After his mother died in 1909, his sisters auctioned off their remaining works at two large sales, in 1911 (The Hague) and 1919 (Amsterdam).

Many of his illustrations were for children's books; notably those for Dom Placide, by Eugène Van Bemmel.

== Sources ==
- Obituary, in : Annuaire de la Société d’Archéologie de Bruxelles 1902, Brussels, 1902.
- N. Hostyn, "Alfred Ronner", in : Nationaal Biografisch Woordenboek, Vol. 14, Brussels, 1992.
- H.J. Kraaij, Henriette Ronner-Knip, 1821-1909: Een virtuoos dierschilderes, Scriptum 1998 ISBN 978-90-559-4081-3
- W. & G. Pas, Dictionnaire biographique arts plastiques en Belgique. Peintres-sculpteurs-graveurs 1800-2002, Antwerp, 2002 ISBN 978-90-7613-802-2
- P. Piron, Dictionnaire des artistes plasticiens de Belgique des XIXe et XXe siècles, Lasne, 2003 ISBN 978-2-930338-53-8
