= Pierre Jean van der Ouderaa =

Belgian painter (1841–1915)

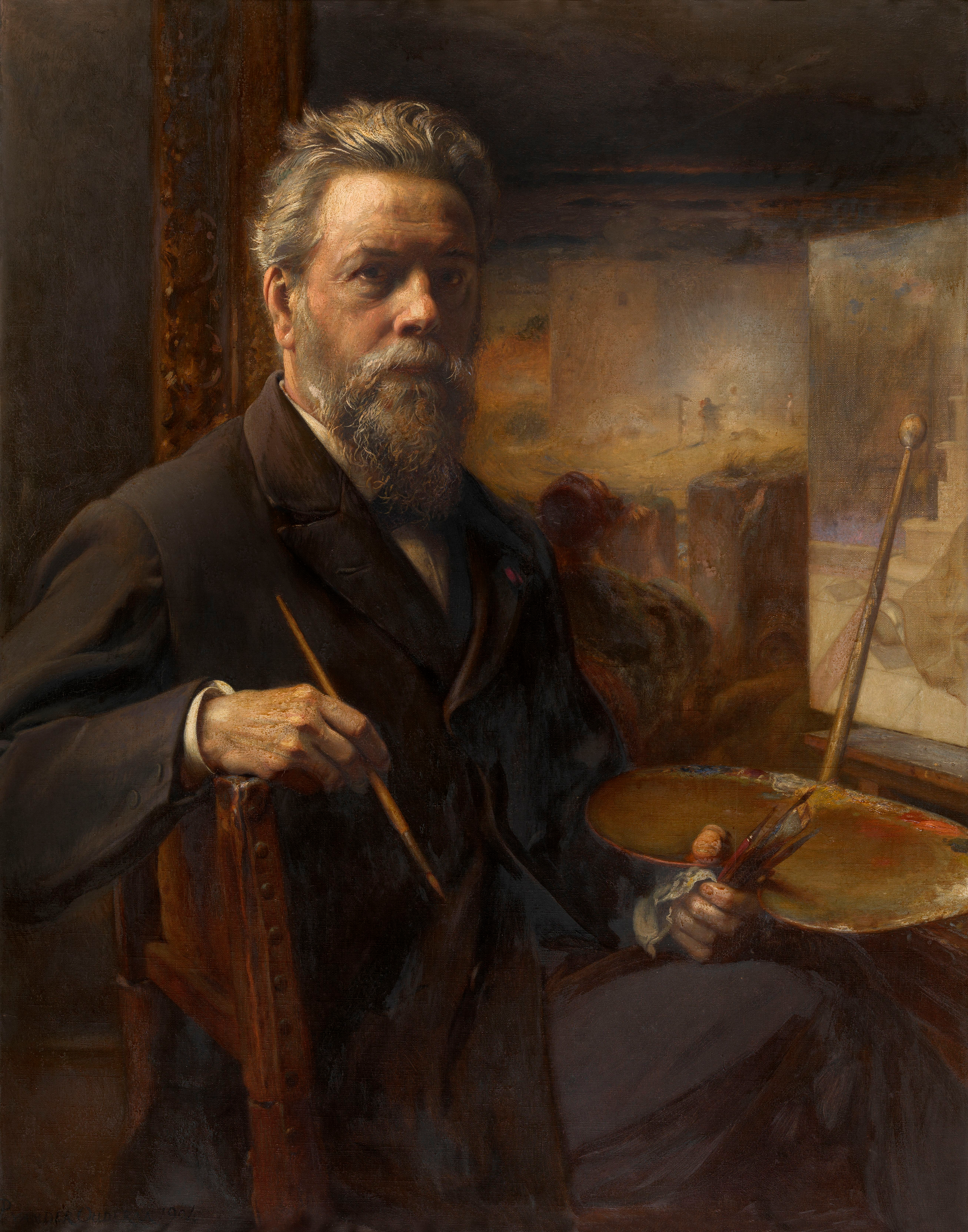
- Self-portrait, 1879
- Born: Pierre Jean van der Ouderaa; 1841; Antwerp, Belgium
- Died: 1915 (aged 73–74)
- Education: Royal Academy of Fine Arts of Antwerp
- Occupations: Painter and lithographer

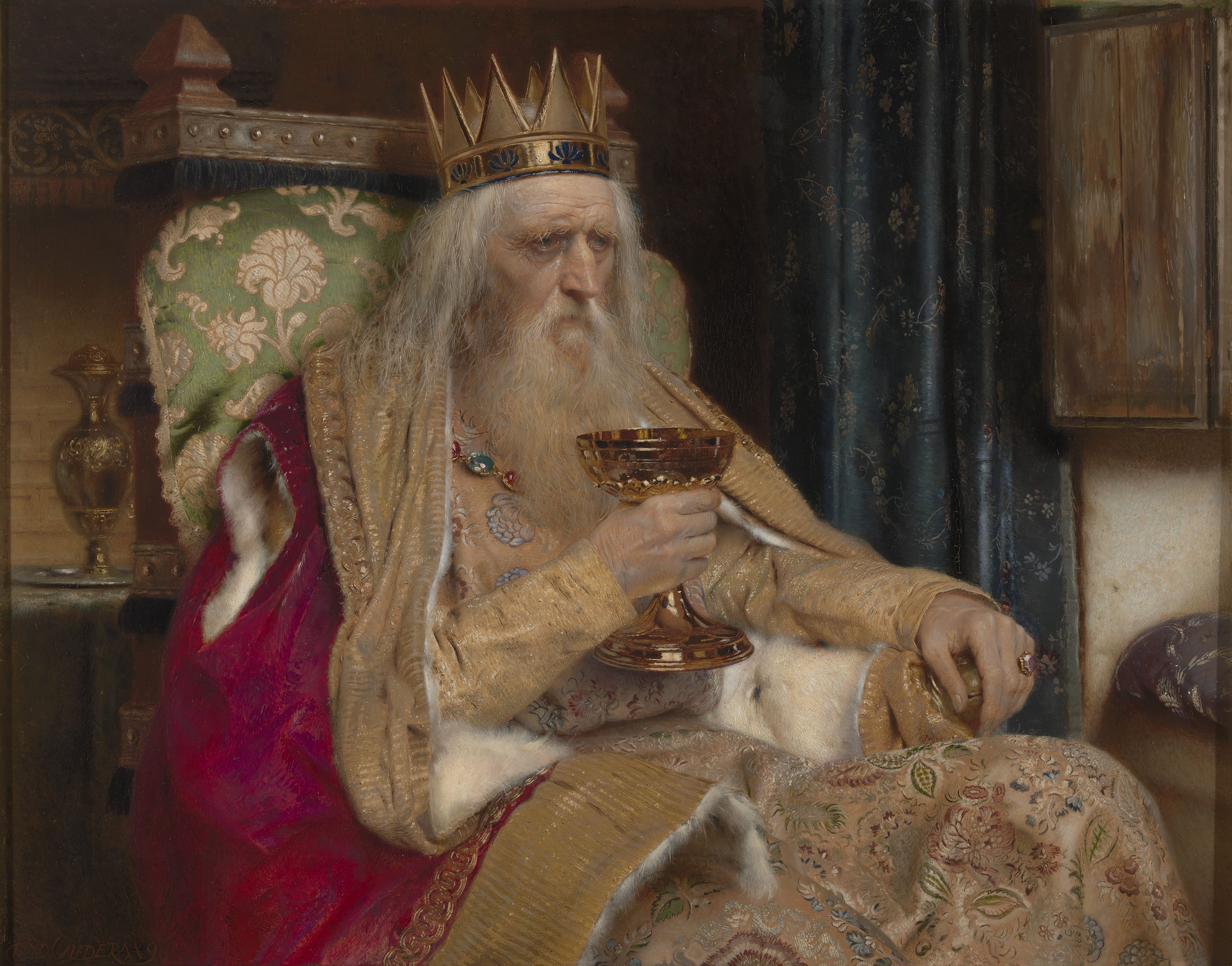
The King of Thule, 1896

Pierre Jean van der Ouderaa (1841–1915) was a Belgian painter and lithographer of religious subjects, genre scenes, portraits, and landscapes.

== Life ==
Pierre Jean van der Ouderaa was born in Antwerp on 13 January 1841. He enrolled at the age of fifteen at the Royal Academy of Fine Arts of Antwerp, and studied, successively, under Jacob Jacobs, Jozef Van Lerius, and Nicaise de Keyser.

In 1865 he came second in the Grand Prix de Rome, and was awarded a three year travel bursary, funded by the Belgian government, to study the paintings of Raphael in Italy. He produced the portrait of Julius II, after Raphael (1865) during this period.

In search of the exotic, he accompanied Albert Cogels (1842–84) on a trip to Algiers, Tunis, Oran and Spain. Upon returning to Belgium in 1869 he devoted himself to history painting. He produced "romantic fantasies" in the style of Hendrik Leys and de Keyser, and the large-scale historical compositions for which he became known. Works from this period include Tanchelin's Sermon (1870) and the Last Resort (1885). In 1890 he painted the Academic triptych Jean Berchmans Lying in State for Antwerp Cathedral.

He died in Antwerp on 5 January 1915, in his seventy-fourth year. His daughter Clotildis was a flower painter.

== Collections ==
- Antwerp: Legal Reconciliation; David Col (1897); The Artist (n.d.); The Holy Women Returning from the Tomb of Christ (1893)
- Brussels: The Last Refuge (Episode from the Spanish Fury) (1885)
- Groningen: Portrait of Eerelmann (n.d.)

== Gallery ==
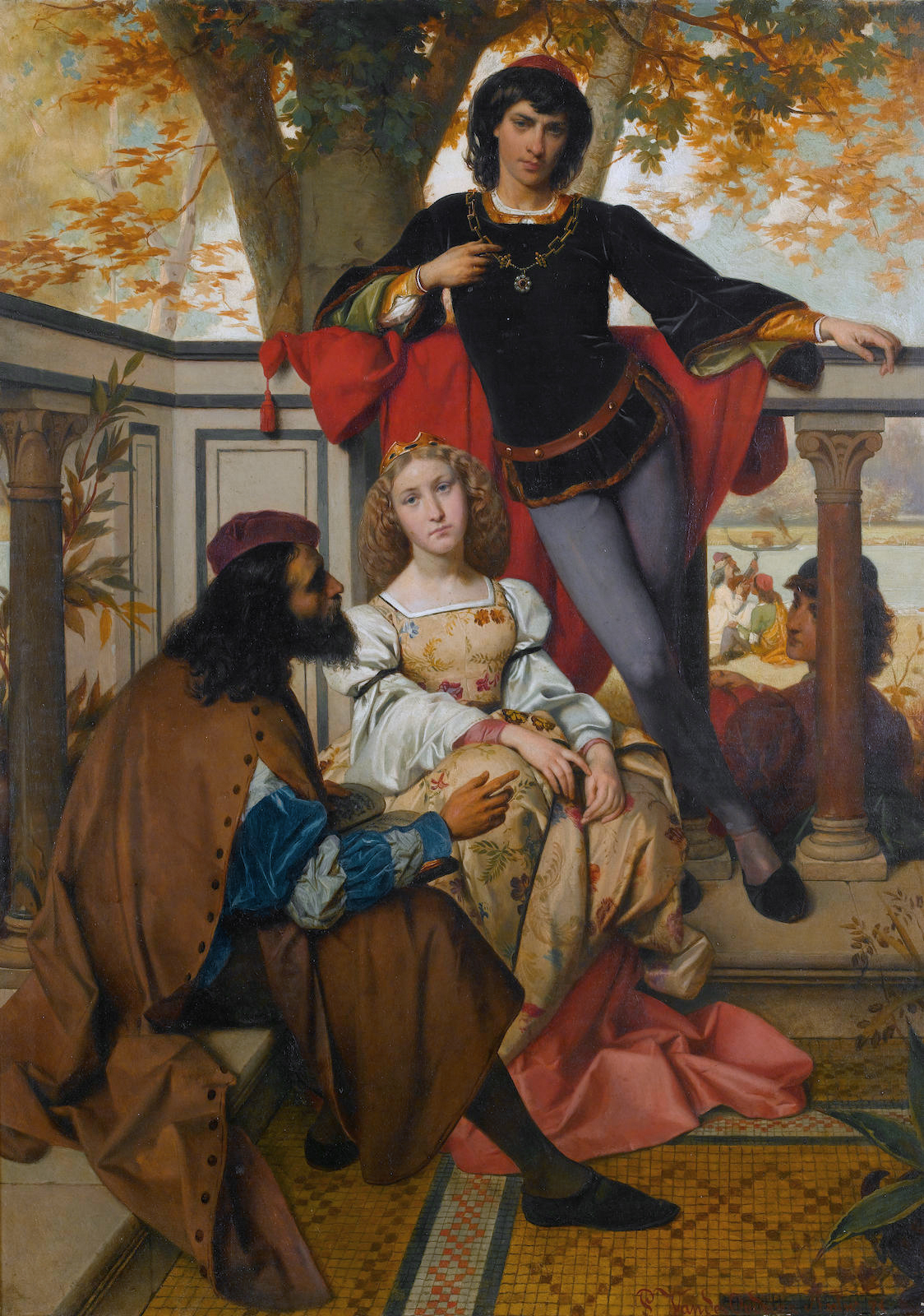
Spiritual Pleasure, 1871

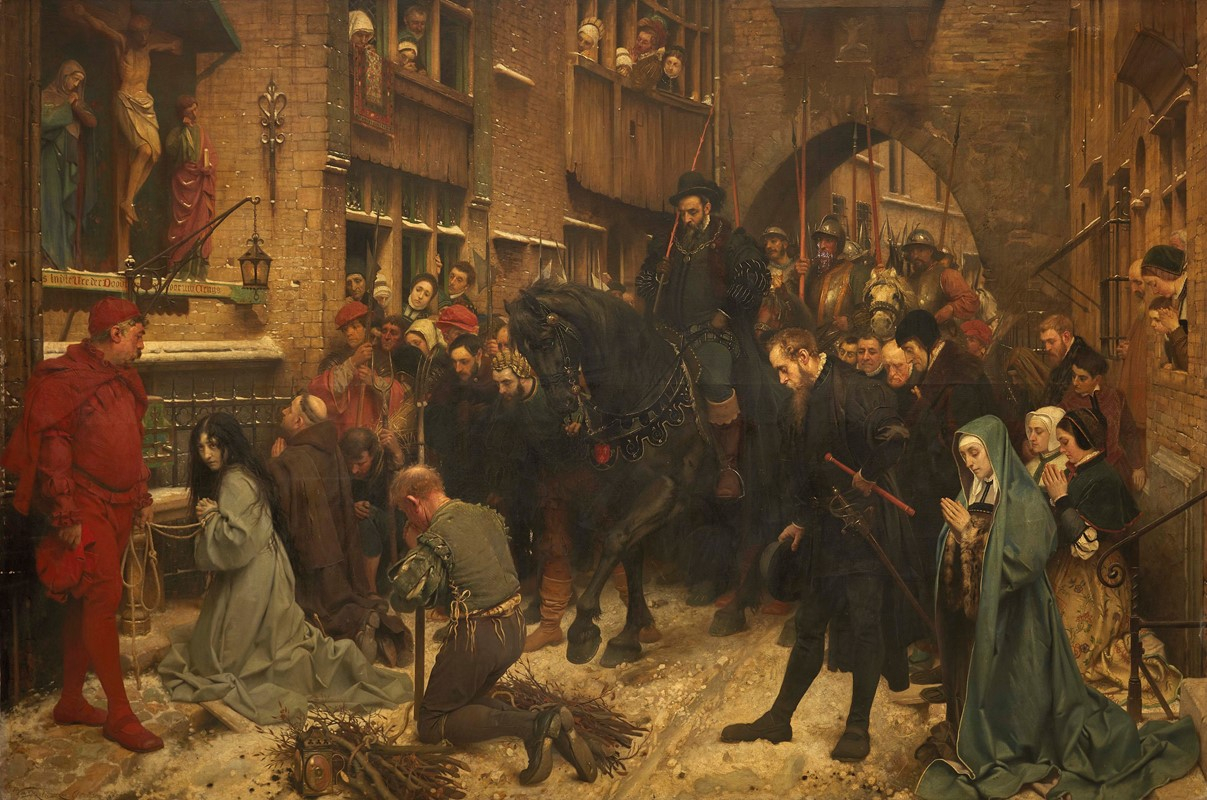
On the Way to the Ordeal, 1880

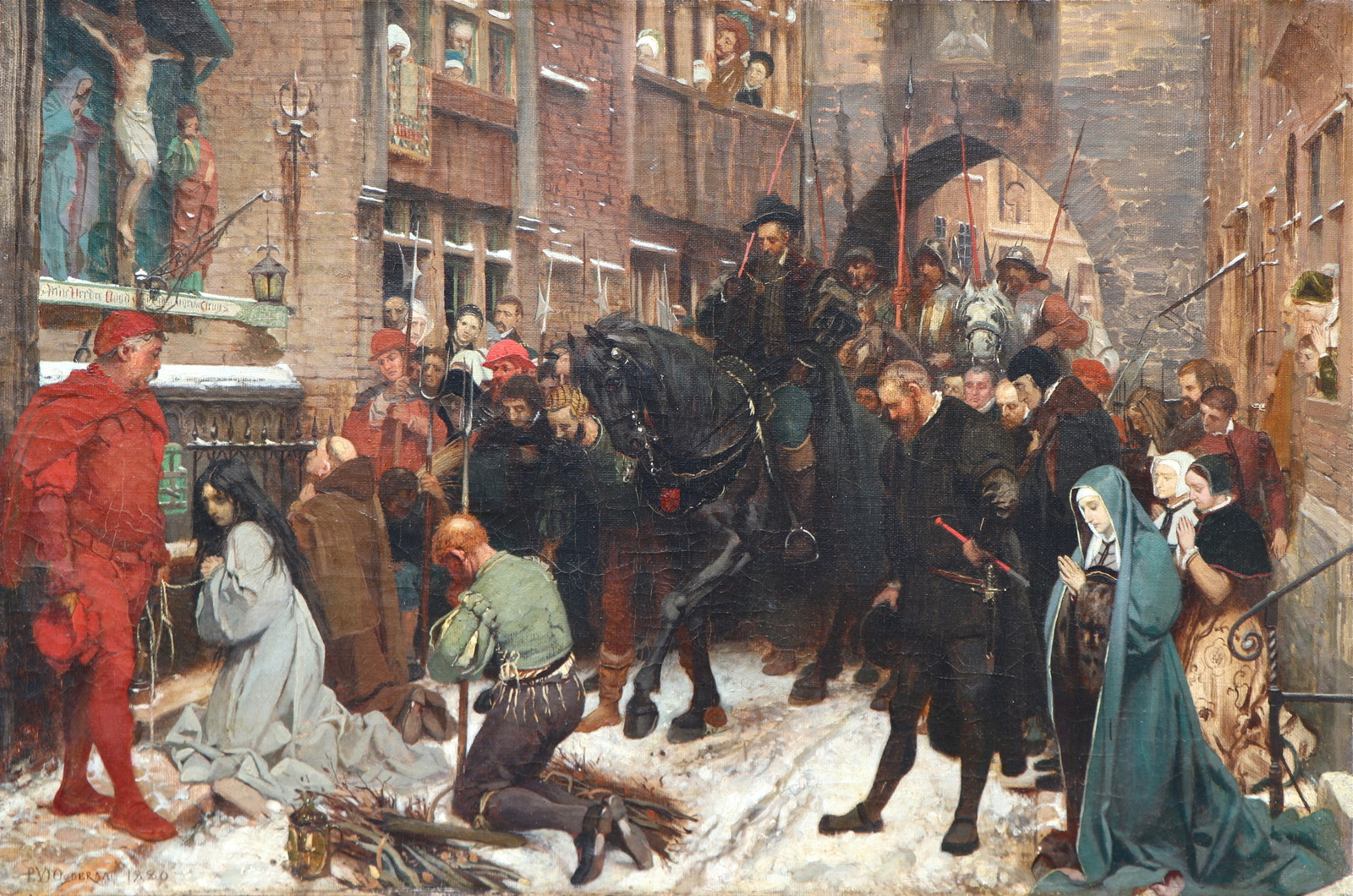
On the Way to the Ordeal, 1880 (modello)

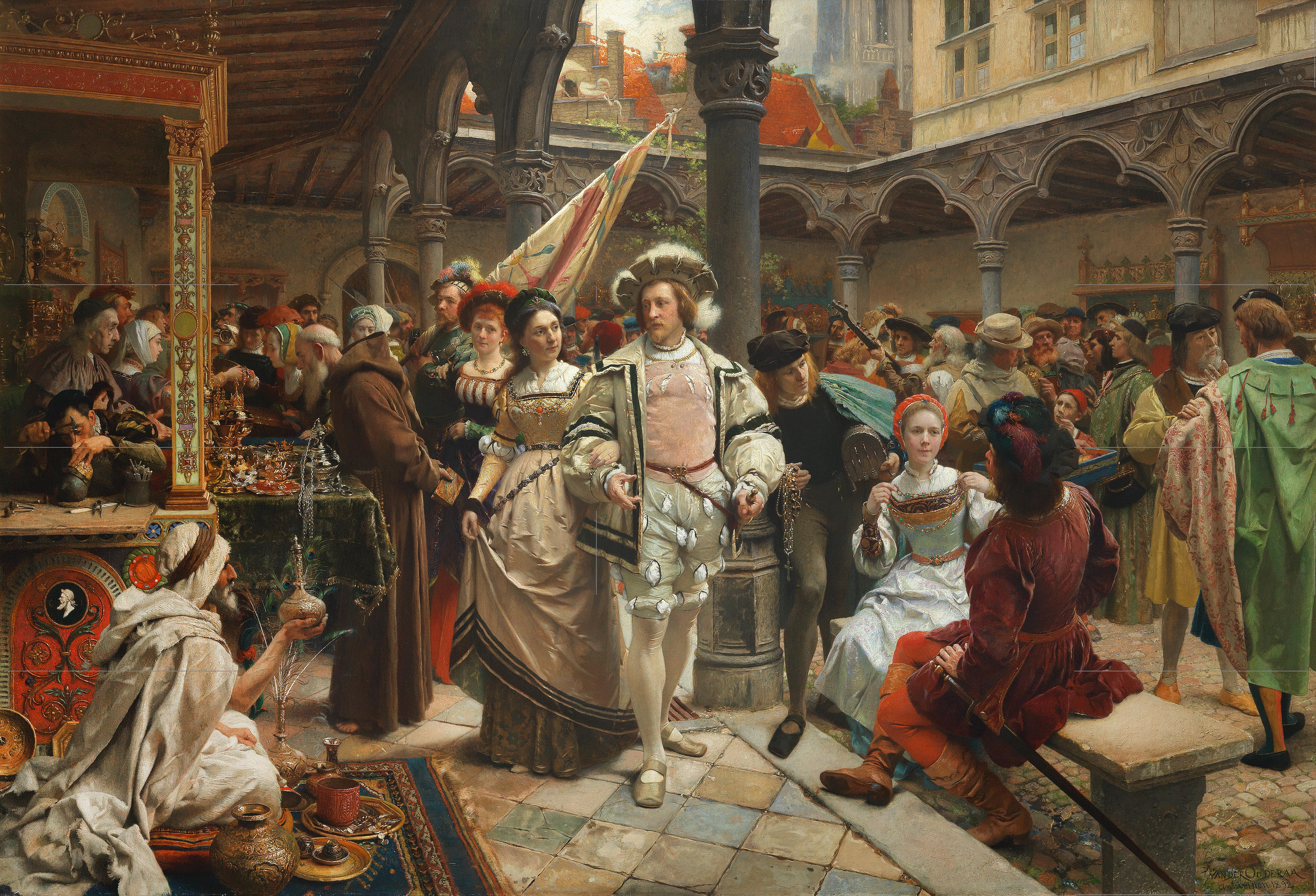
Fair at the Old Stock Exchange in Antwerp, 1892

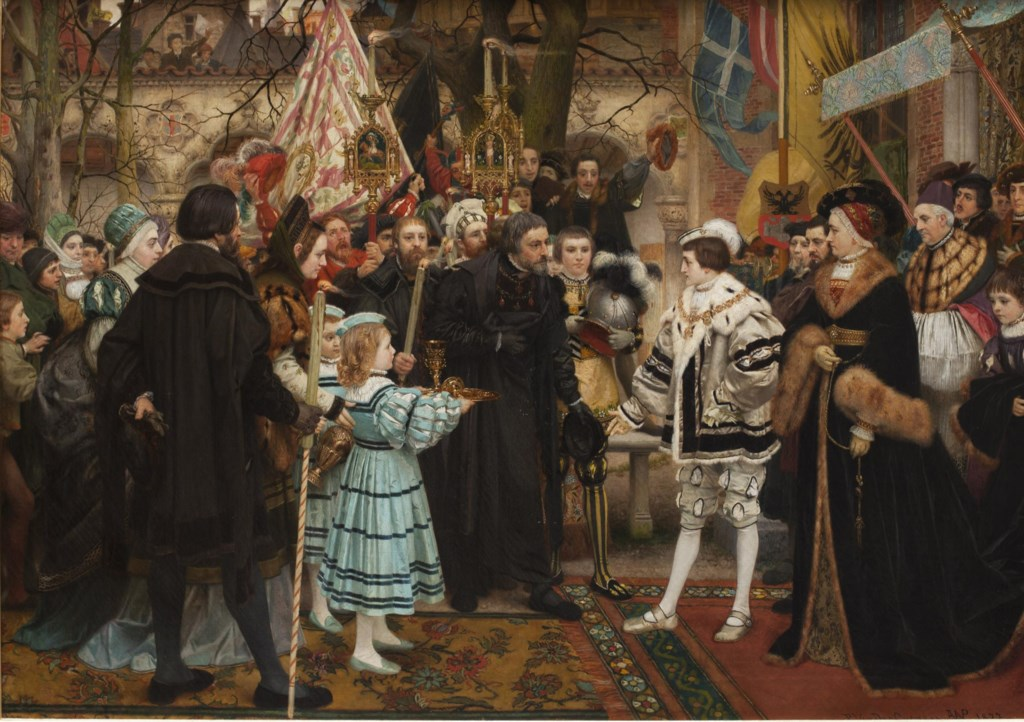
Archduke Charles visiting Antwerp in 1515

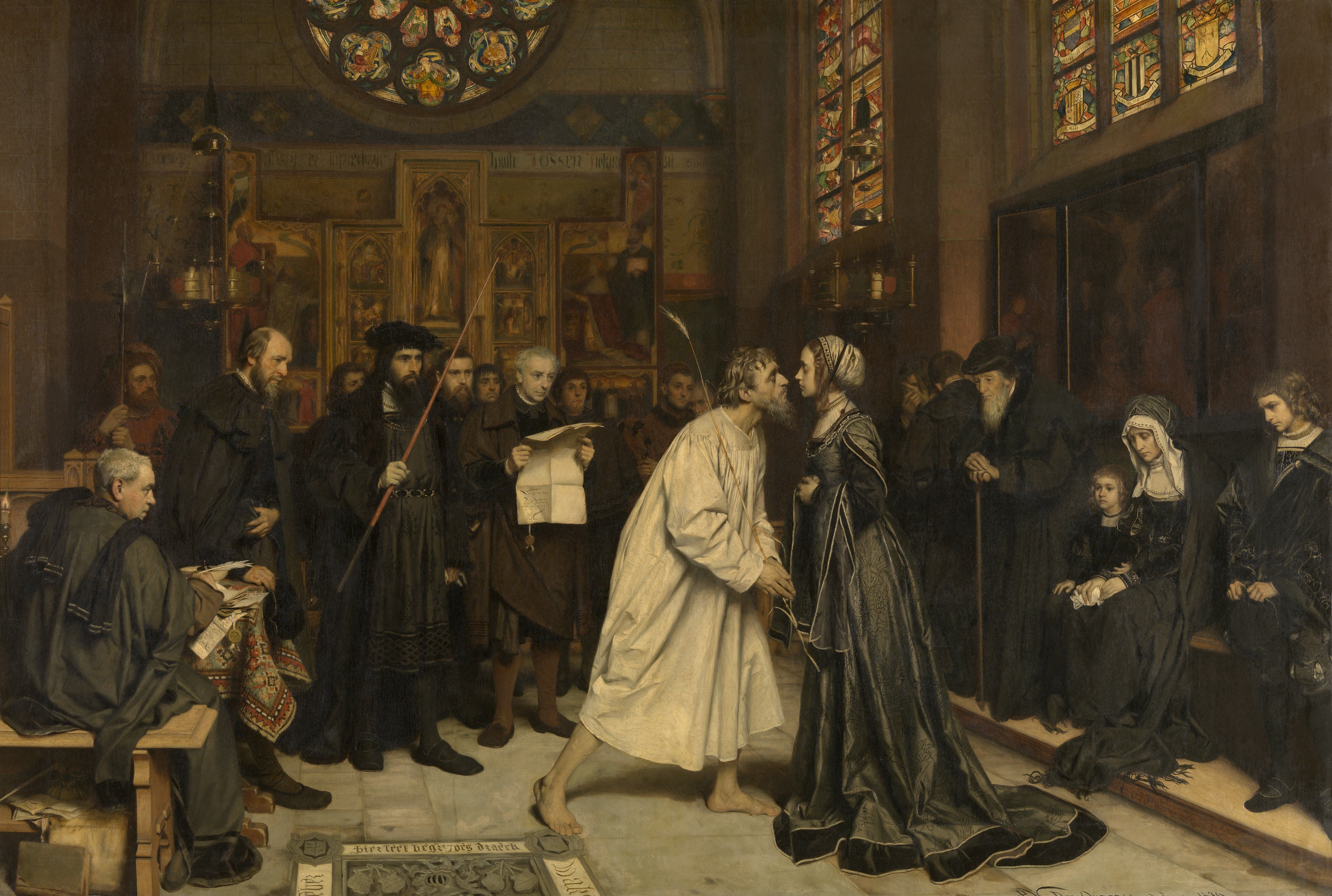
De mondzoen ('The Mouth Kiss')

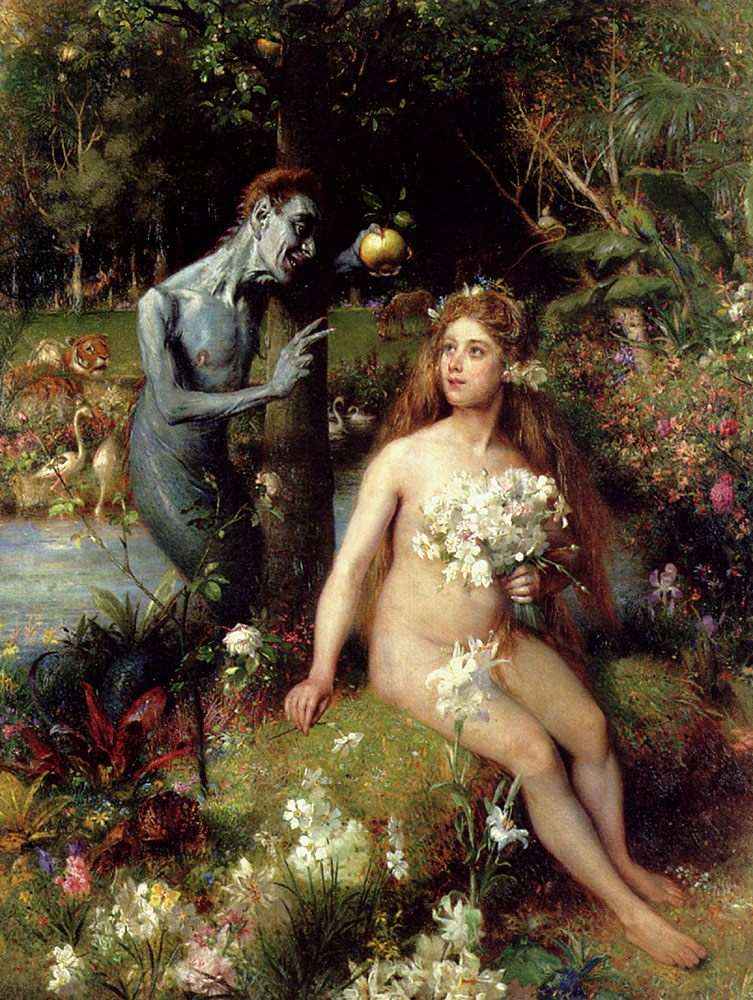
The Temptation of Eve, 1910

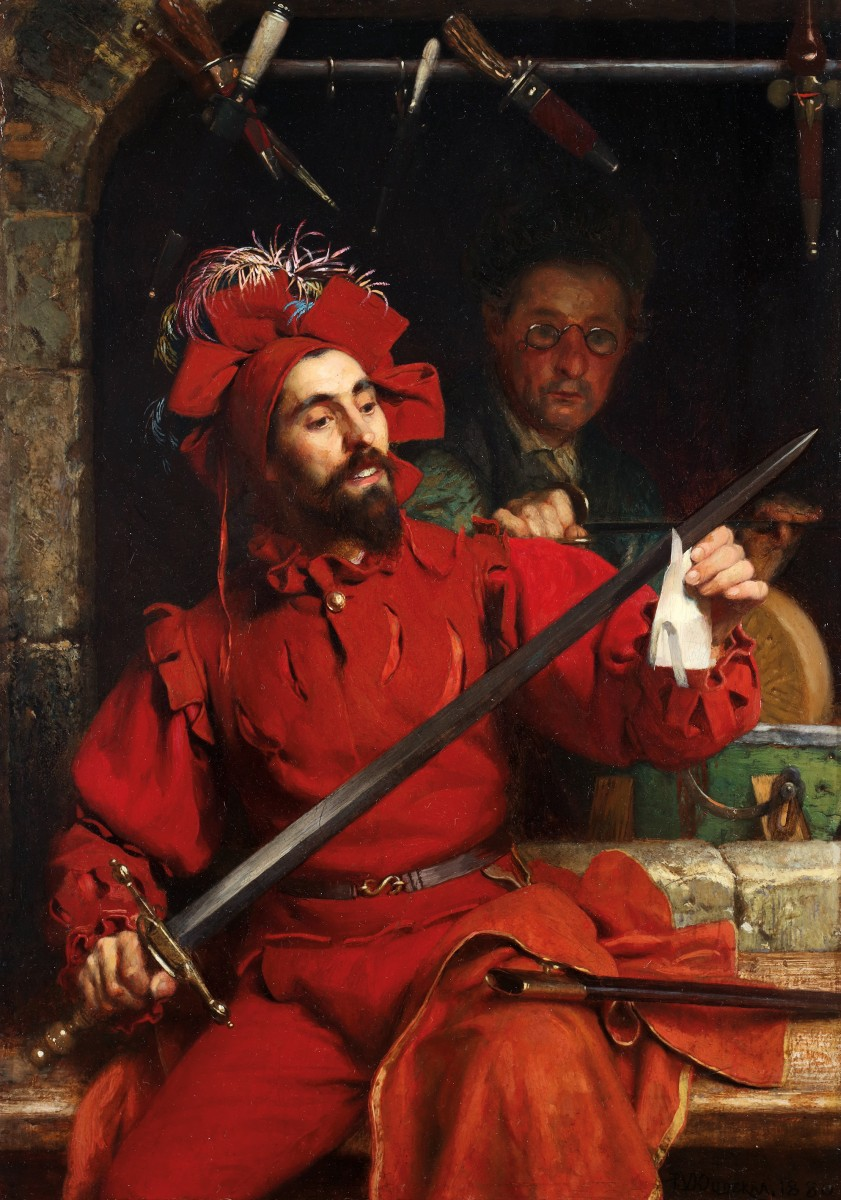
The Smith and his Sword

== Sources ==
- Beyer, Andreas; Savoy, Bénédicte; Tegethoff, Wolf, eds. (2021). "Ouderaa, Pierre Jean van der". In Allgemeines Künstlerlexikon - Internationale Künstlerdatenbank. De Gruyter.
- Jacobs, Alain (2003). "Van der Ouderaa, Piet Jan". In Grove Art Online. Oxford Art Online. Oxford University Press.
- Oliver, Valerie Cassel, ed. (2011). "Ouderra, Pierre Jan van der, Called Piet". In Benezit Dictionary of Artists. Oxford Art Online. Oxford University Press.
