= Joseph August Knip =

Dutch painter (1777-1847)

- Born: 3 August 1777
- Died: 1 October 1847 (aged 70)
- Occupation: Painter
- Children: Henriëtte Ronner-Knip, August Knip
- Relatives: Henriëtte Geertruida Knip

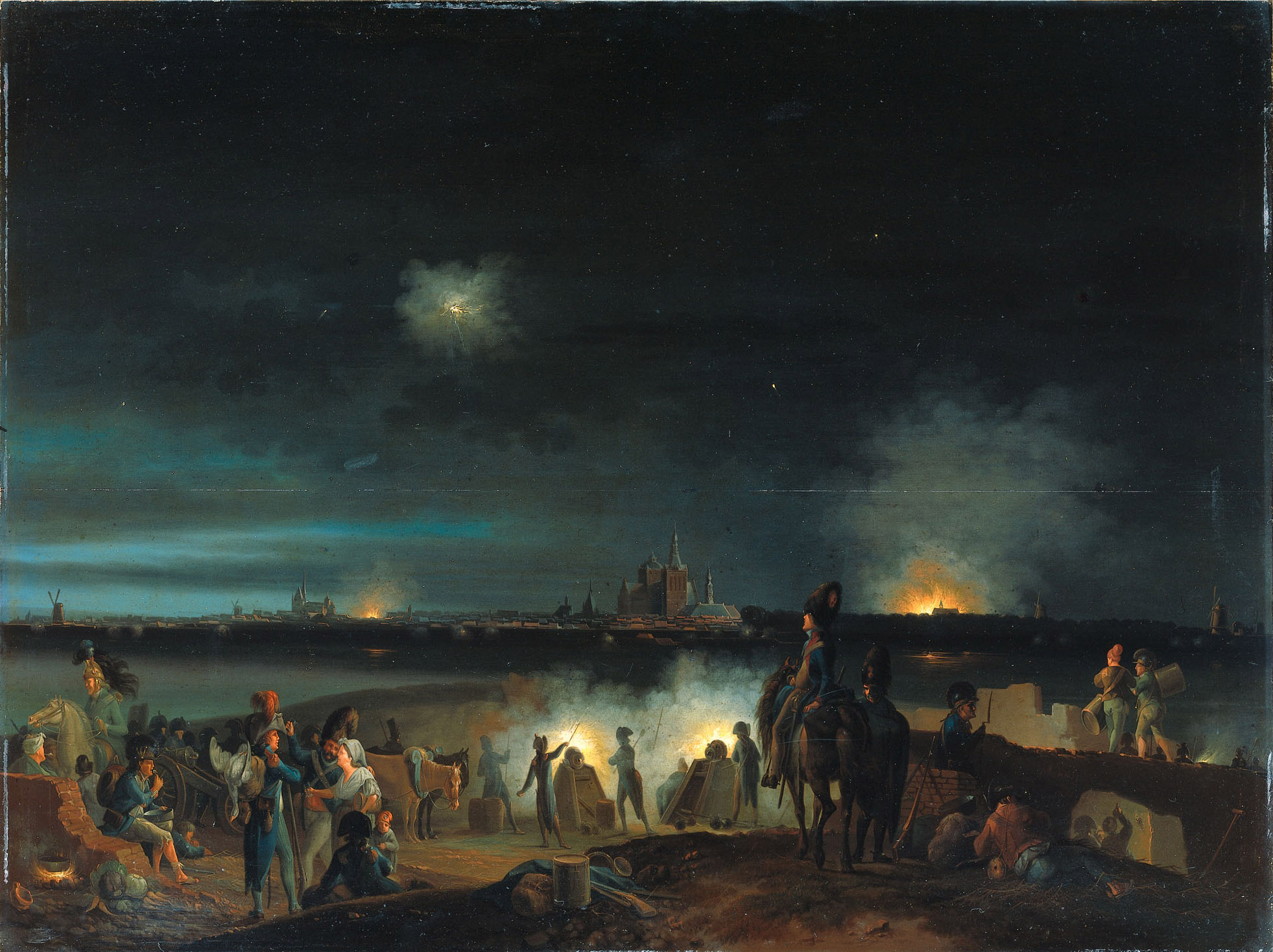
The Shelling of 's-Hertogenbosch during the French Revolutionary Wars (1800)

Joseph August Knip (Latinised: Josephus Augustus Knip; baptised 3 August 1777, Tilburg – buried 1 October 1847, Berlicum) was a Dutch painter.

== Biography ==
Son of decorative painter Nicolaas Frederik Knip, who was his first teacher, he moved with his family to 's-Hertogenbosch when he was eleven years old. In 1794, the French besieged and captured the town. At nineteen he became the family breadwinner after his father went blind. He was the first teacher of his younger sister Henriëtte Geertruida Knip.

In 1801, he established himself in Paris, where he accepted commissions for topographical paintings. He also became drawing master to Louis Napoléon. He spent nine years in Paris. At the end of 1809 he went to Rome, where he remained until 1812. He also travelled, making trips to Naples, the Sabine Hills, the Alban Hills, and the Campagna. Watercolours exist from these trips, from places ranging from Palestrina to Terni. In 1813, he returned to the Netherlands with his wife, the painter Pauline Rifer de Courcelles. He settled in 's-Hertogenbosch, where he worked as a painter. He later lived in Amsterdam and in Paris. He went blind in 1832, after which he was given a pension by William I of the Netherlands.

His daughter, of whom he was the first teacher, was Henriëtte Ronner-Knip, who was named after his sister.
