= Henriëtte Ronner-Knip =

Dutch-Belgian painter (1821–1909)

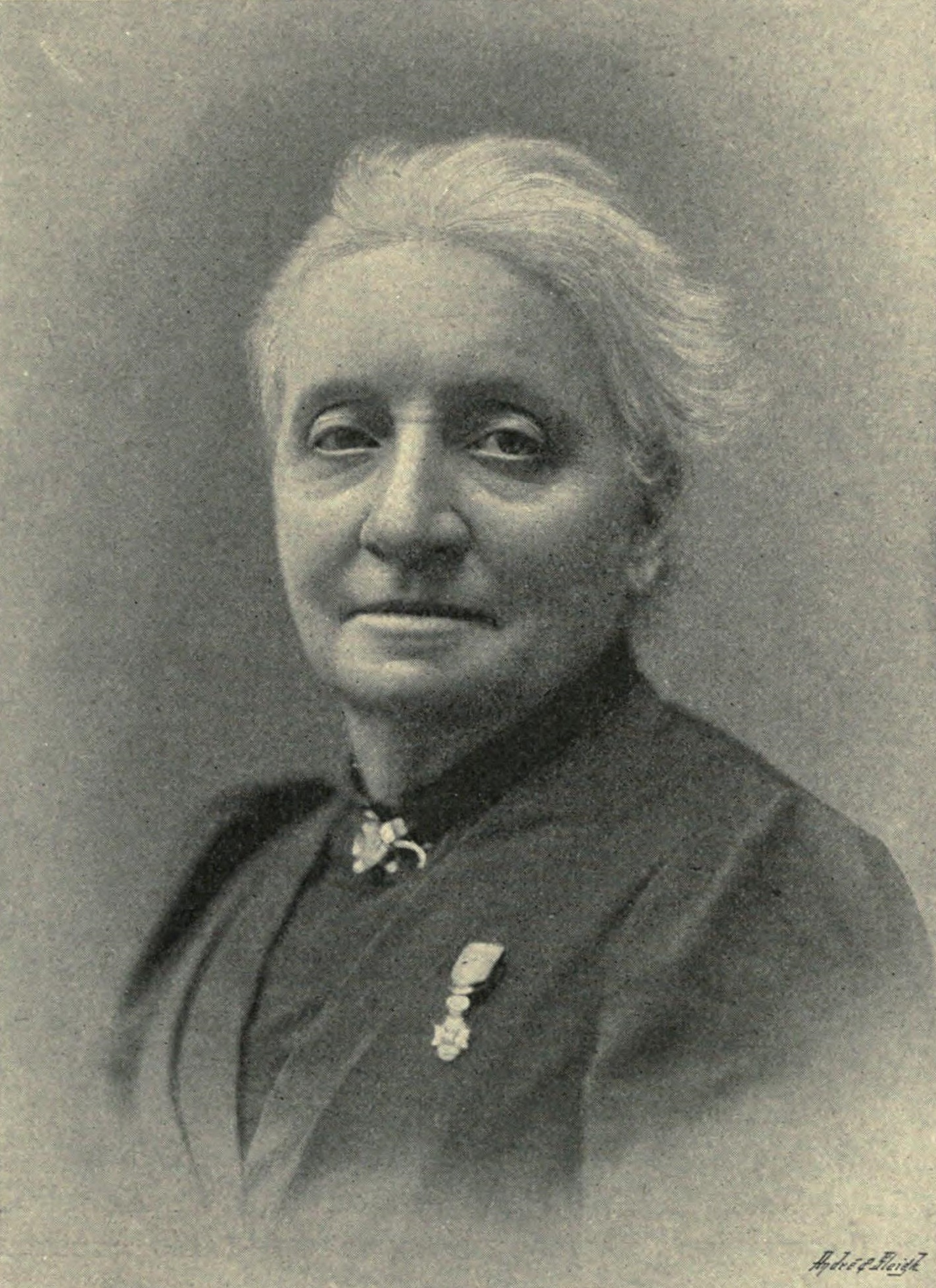
- Ronner-Knip c. 1895
- Born: 31 May 1821; Amsterdam, United Kingdom of the Netherlands
- Died: 28 February 1909 (aged 87); Ixelles, Belgium
- Known for: Painting
- Movement: Romanticism
- Children: 6, including Alfred and Alice
- Father: Joseph August Knip

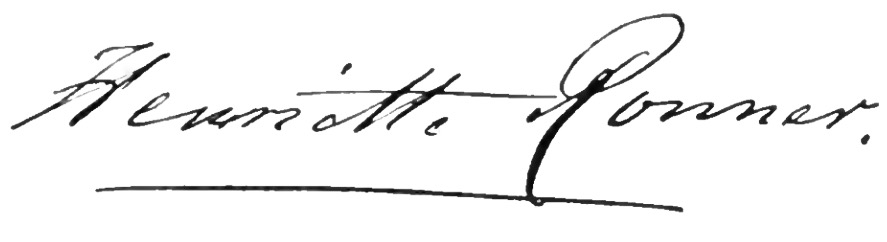
Ronner-Knip's signature

Henriëtte Ronner-Knip (Dutch pronunciation: [ɦɑ̃ːriˈjɛtə ˈrɔnər ˈknɪp]; 31 May 1821 – 28 February 1909) was a Dutch-Belgian artist chiefly in the Romantic style who is best known for her still life animal paintings; especially cats.

== Biography ==
She was born in Amsterdam into a family of artists and received her first lessons from her father, Joseph August Knip, who also gave lessons to her aunt (his youngest sister), Henriëtte Geertruida Knip. His father, Nicolaas (1741–1808), was an artist as well. Some sources indicate that her mother was Pauline Rifer de Courcelles, a painter of birds, who was her father's first wife but, at the time of her birth, they were apparently separated and he was living with his mistress, Cornelia van Leeuwen (1790–1848), who is also credited with being Henriëtte's mother.

The family moved often as her father found work giving lessons. But, by 1823, her father was already blind in one eye. The following year, he and Rifer de Courcelles were finally divorced and he married Leeuwen. After he became totally blind in 1832, the family continued to move about, staying for a short time in The Hague, then Beek and 's-Hertogenbosch before settling in Berlicum in 1840. By this time, she was essentially in charge of the family's finances and legal obligations, and had begun painting seriously by 1835. She was a participant in the Exhibition of Living Masters in 1838.

After Leeuwen's death, she moved to Amsterdam where she painted farms, animals and forests from nature; first in watercolor, then in oils. That same year, she became the first woman admitted as an "active member" to Arti et Amicitiae. In 1850, she married Feico Ronner (1819–1883) and they moved to Brussels. He was often ill and could not be regularly employed, so he became her manager. At this time, she narrowed her subject matter, focusing almost entirely on dogs and cats. After 1870, she painted her most famous works, featuring long-haired, often playful cats in bourgeois settings. She continued to paint dogs too; notably lapdogs belonging to Marie Henriette of Austria and Princess Marie of Hohenzollern-Sigmaringen. Ronner-Knip exhibited her work at the Palace of Fine Arts at the 1893 World's Columbian Exposition in Chicago, Illinois.

In her later years, she had a house with a large garden, where she kept hunting dogs, cats and a parrot that she used as models. After observing them in her studio, she would make paper sculptures in the desired poses and set them together with props, such as furniture and fabrics. She occasionally collaborated with the genre artist, David Col.

In 1887, she was awarded the Order of Leopold and, in 1901, became a member of the Order of Orange-Nassau. Her son Alfred and daughters Alice and Emma also became artists. She often exhibited with them.

She died on 28 February 1909 in Ixelles.

== Works ==
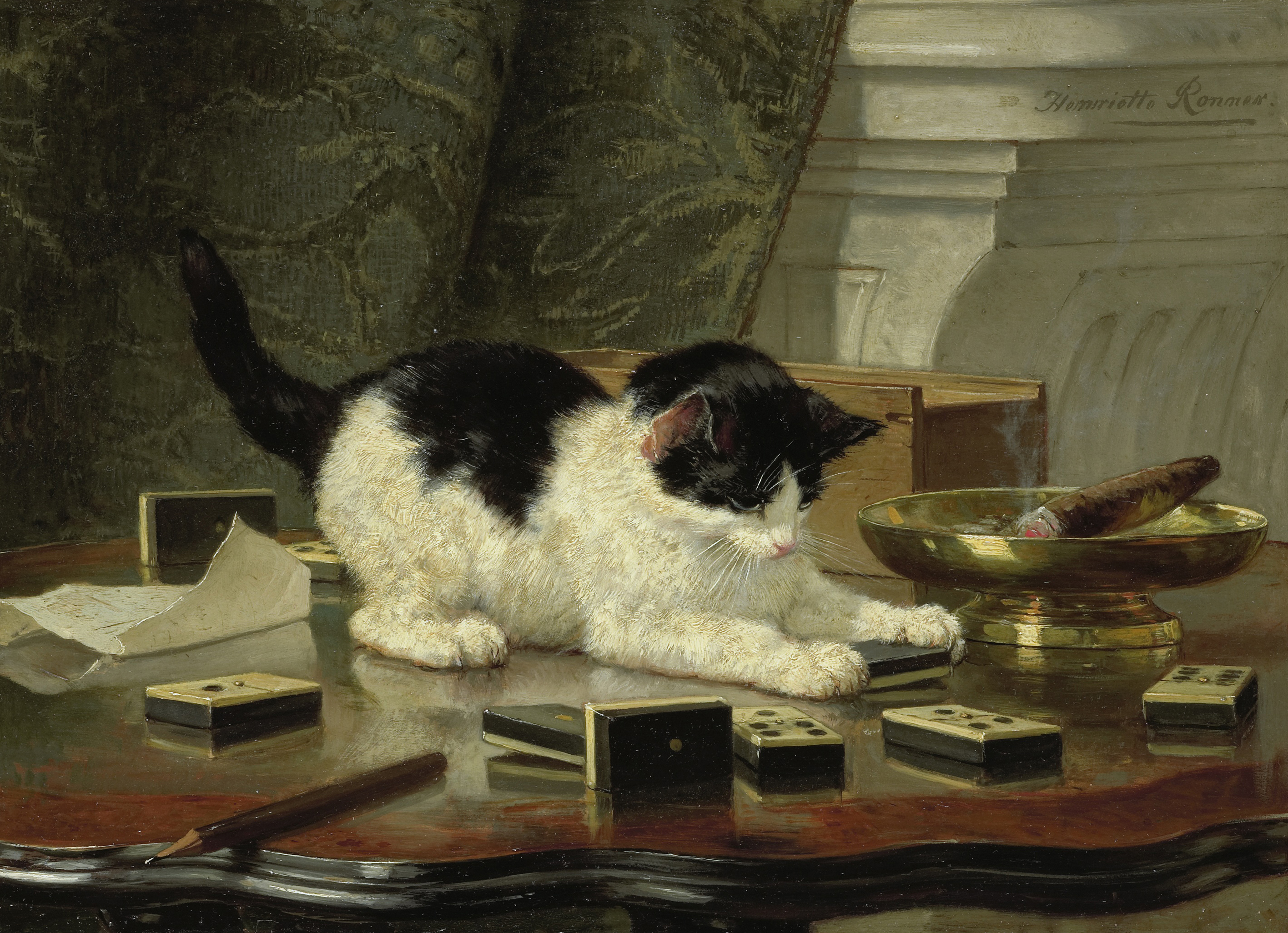
Kitten's Game

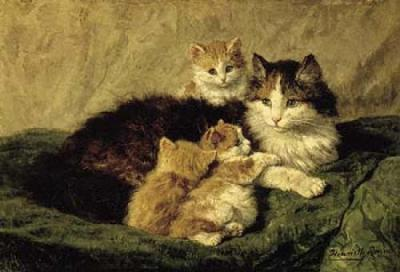
Contentment

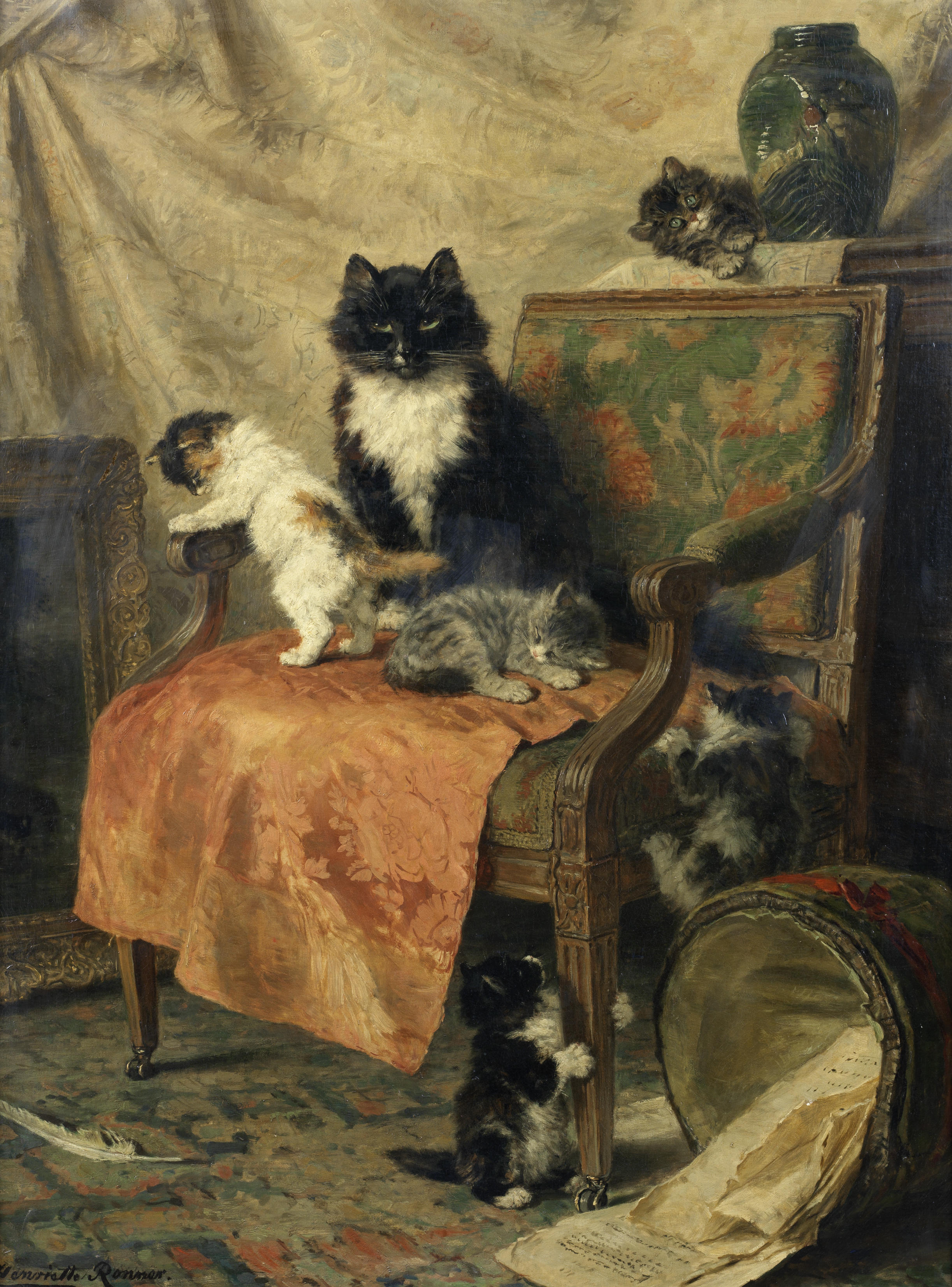
Kittens at Play

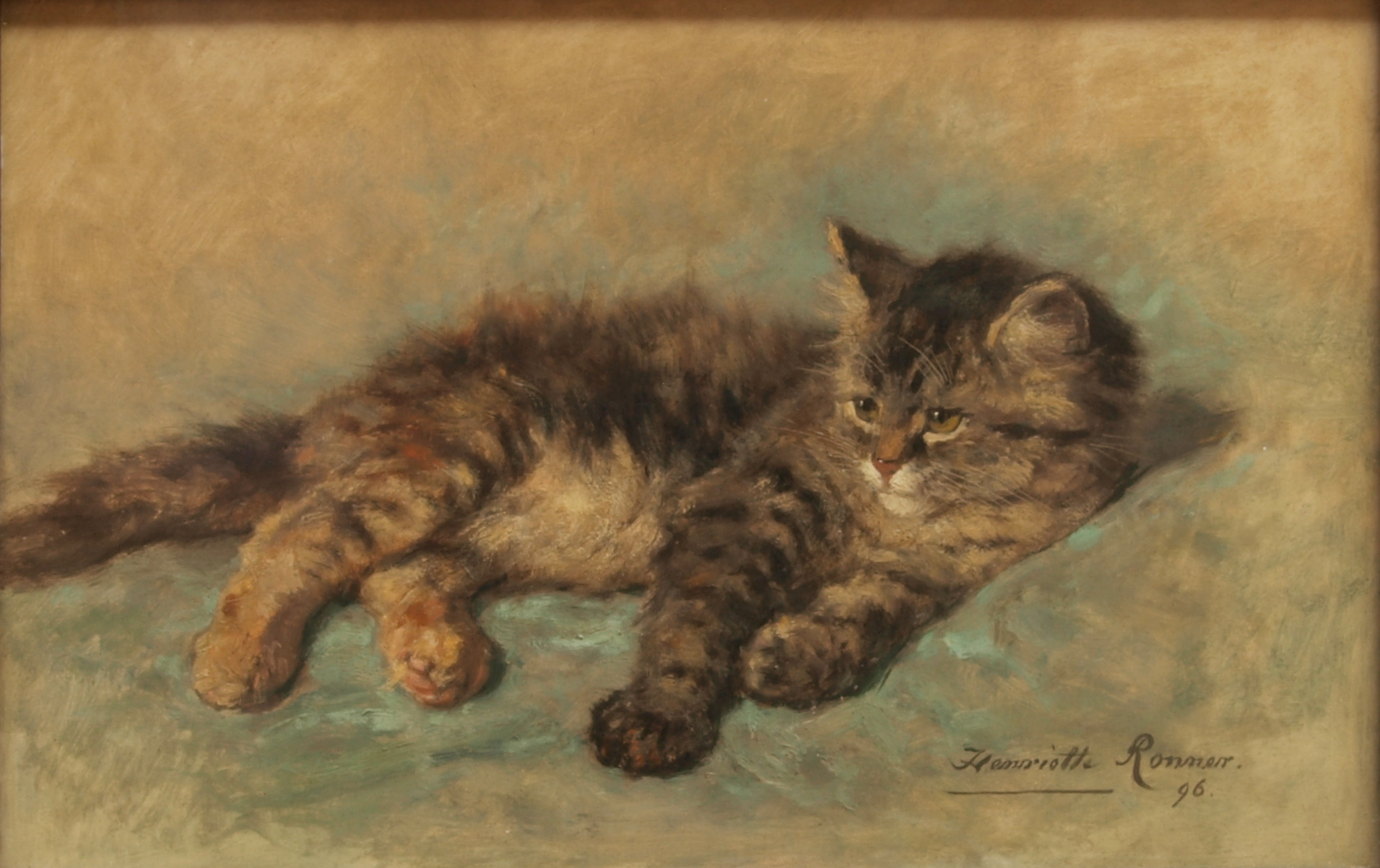
Cat Resting

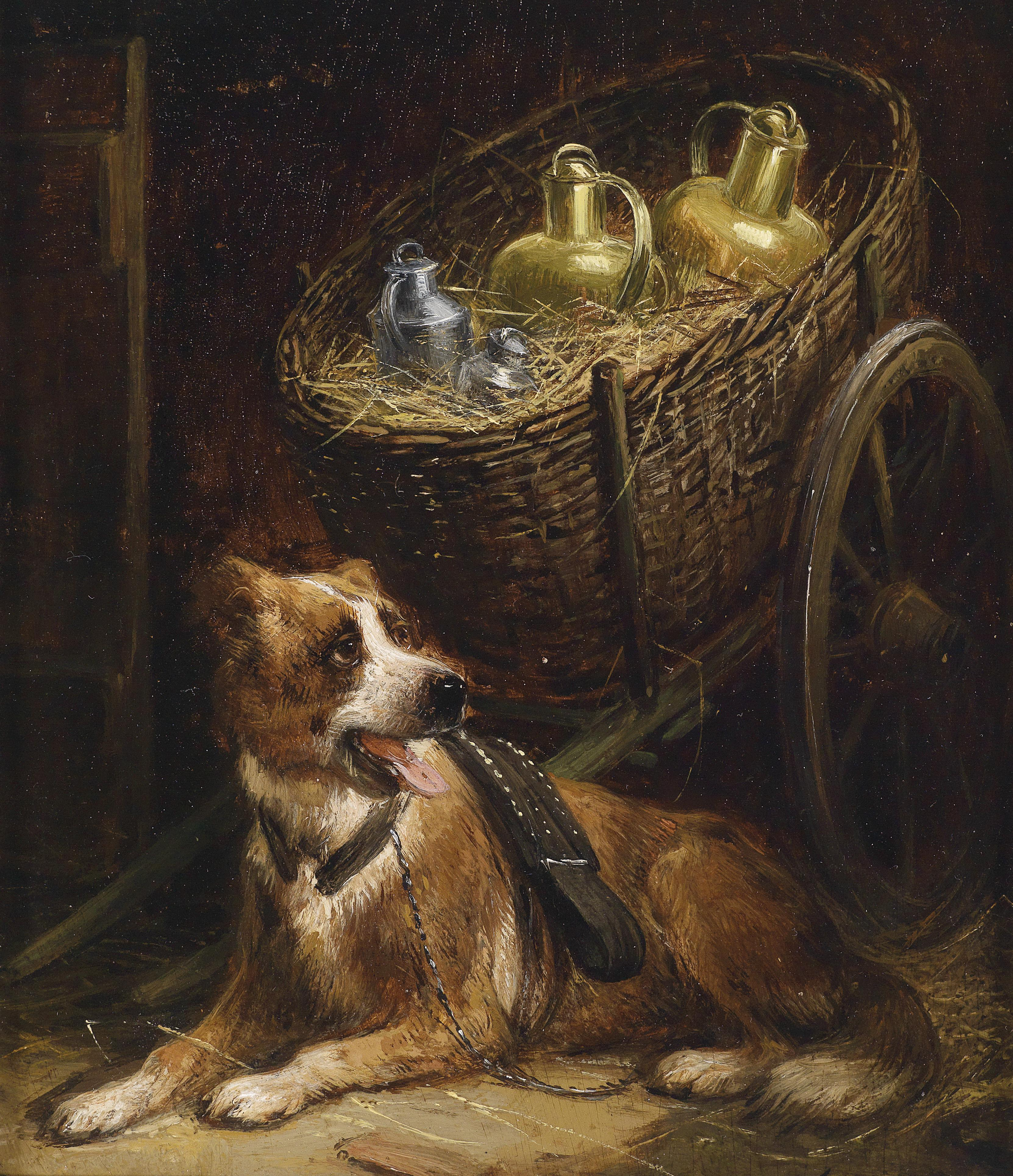
Cart Dog at Rest
