= Henriëtte Geertruida Knip =

Dutch artist (1783–1842)

Henriette Geertruida Knip
- Born: 19 July 1783; Tilburg, Netherlands
- Died: 29 May 1843 (aged 59); Haarlem, Netherlands
- Known for: Painting

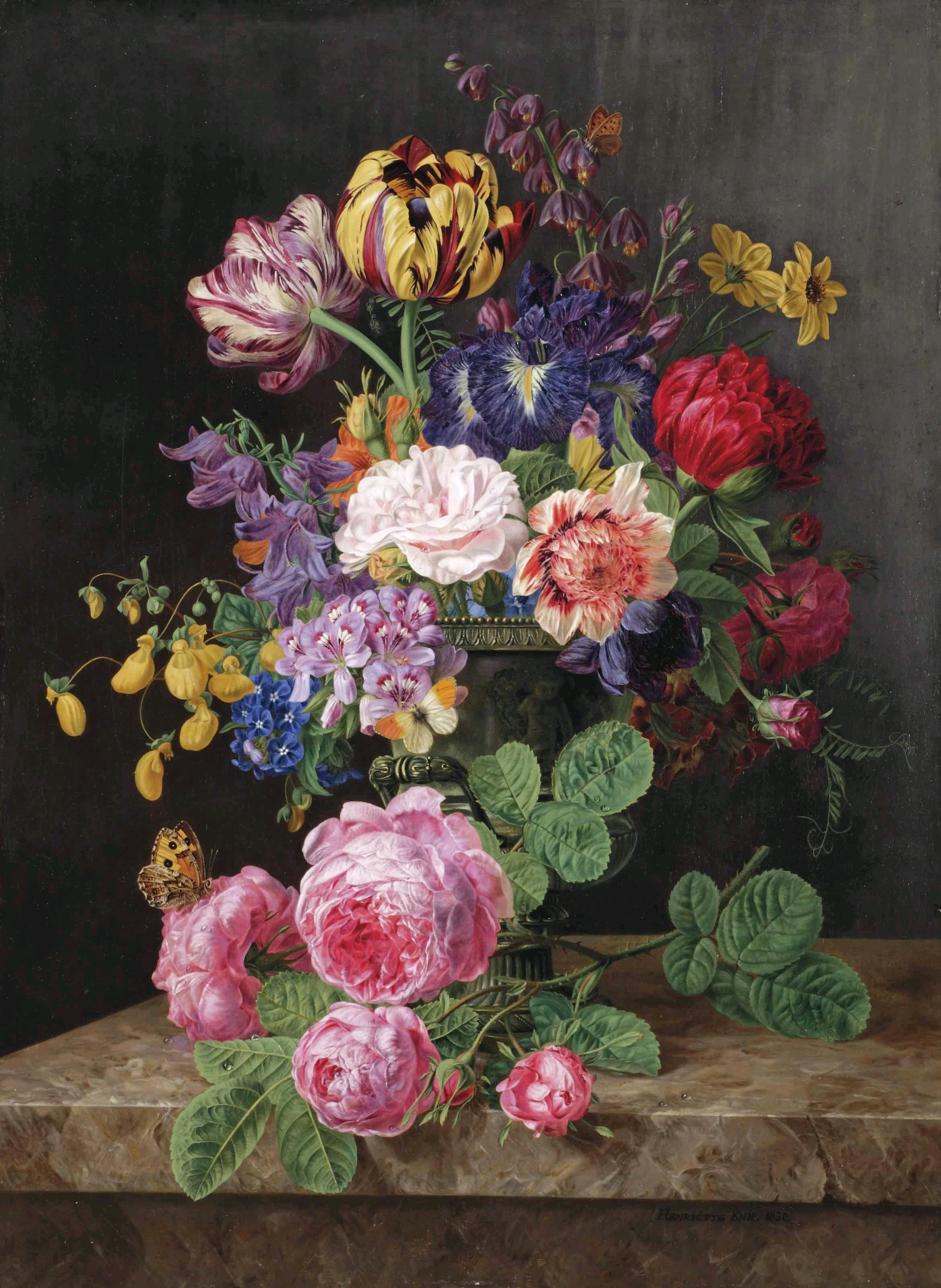
Flowers in a Vase (1830)

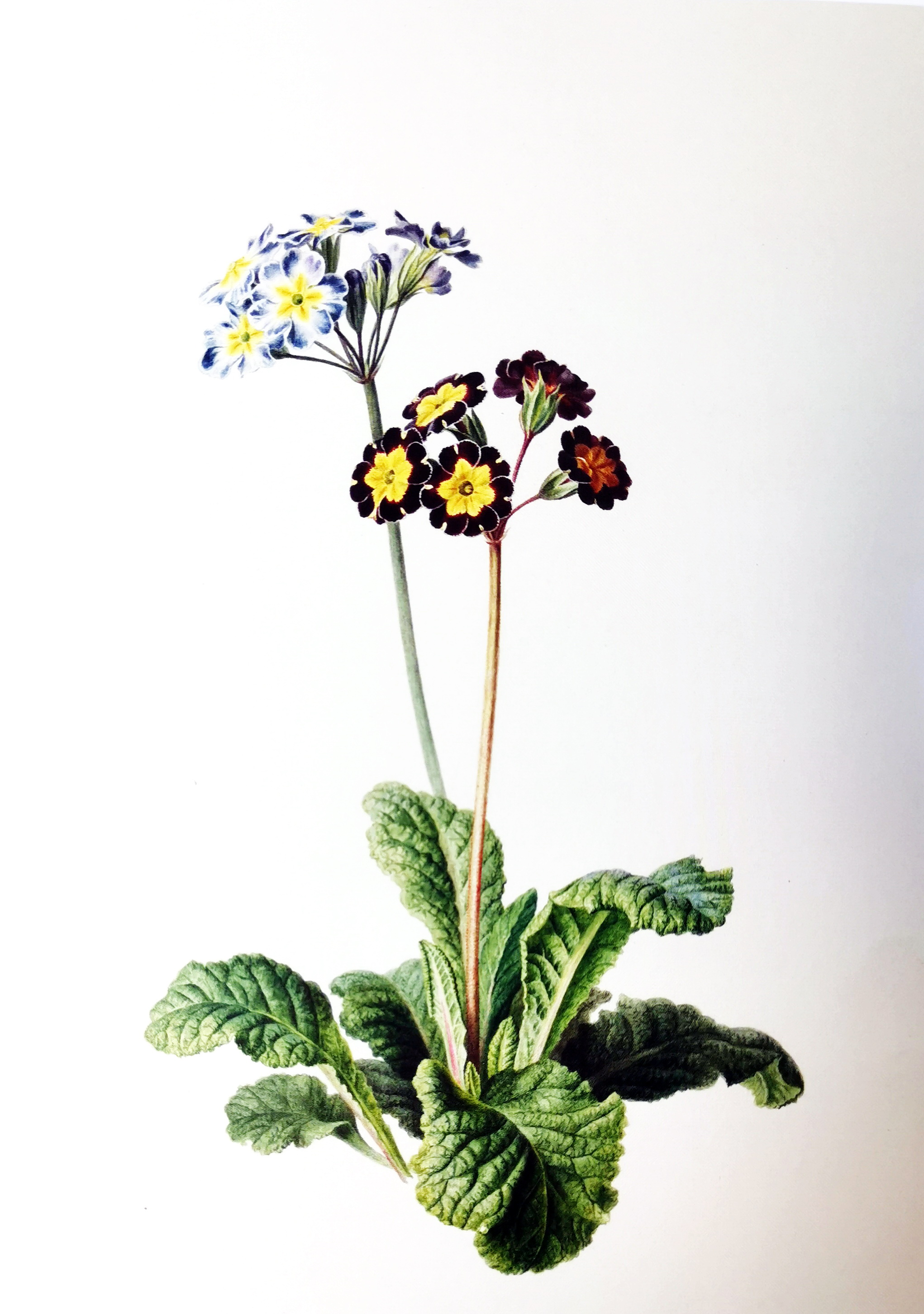
Primula

Henriëtte Geertruida Knip (19 July 1783 – 29 May 1842) was a flower painter from the Netherlands.

Knip was born in Tilburg as the daughter of the painter Nicolaas Frederik Knip. After her father went blind, she followed lessons from her older brother, Joseph August Knip. In 1802, she followed him to Paris and took lessons from the flower painter Gerard van Spaendonck. She became a successful painter and spent summers in Haarlem painting the flowers of the various flower companies, and she spent winters in Amsterdam teaching ladies how to paint.

In 1824 she went back again to Paris to take lessons from the artist Jan Frans van Dael. When her brother began to go blind, she was able to support his family as well as herself. She never married and died in Haarlem. Her work is sometimes confused with that of her niece Henriëtte Ronner-Knip, whose works generally contain animals.
