= Young Women Looking at Japanese Articles =

Painting by James Tissot

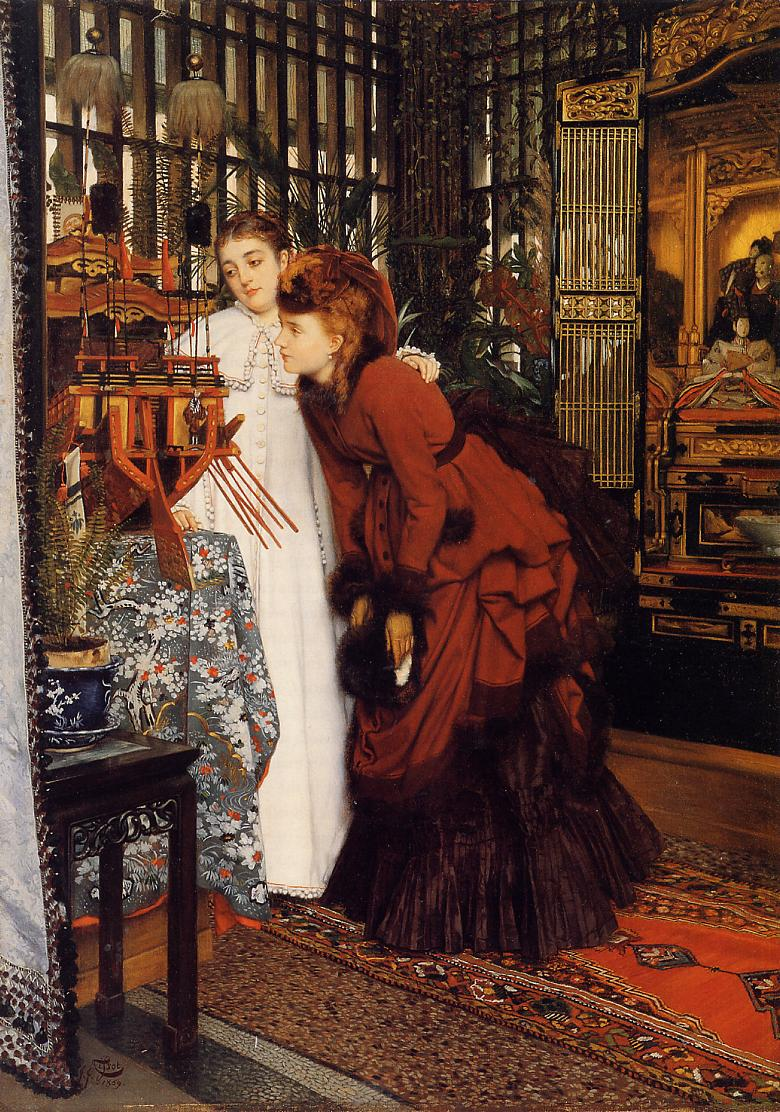
- Artist: James Tissot
- Year: 1869
- Type: Oil on canvas, genre painting
- Dimensions: 70.5 cm × 50.2 cm (27.8 in × 19.8 in)
- Location: Cincinnati Art Museum, Ohio

Young Women Looking at Japanese Articles is an oil painting on canvas by the French artist James Tissot, from 1869.

== History and description ==
It depicts two young French woman peering curiously at artefacts acquired from Japan. This reflected the burst of enthusiasm for Japanese influences, known as Japonisme, that impacted European art following the Perry Mission to Japan in 1853.

It was one of a series of Japanese-themed painting Tissot produced during the decade. The following year Tissot left for London following the outbreak of the Franco-Prussian War and went on to produce many of his most famous genre paintings in Britain. Today the painting is in the collection of Cincinnati Art Museum in Ohio, which acquired it in 1984.

== Bibliography ==
- Gere, Charlotte & Hoskins, Lesley. The House Beautiful: Oscar Wilde and the Aesthetic Interior. Lund Humphries, 2000.
- Marshall, Nancy Rose & Warner, Malcolm. James Tissot: Victorian Life, Modern Love. Yale University Press, 1999.
- Ōmori, Tatsuji Japonisme in Art. 1980.
- Yamaguchi, Arisa. Sartorial Japonisme and the Experience of Kimonos in Britain, 1865–1914. Taylor & Francis, 2023.
