= Japonisme =

European imitation of Japanese art during the 19th and 20th centuries

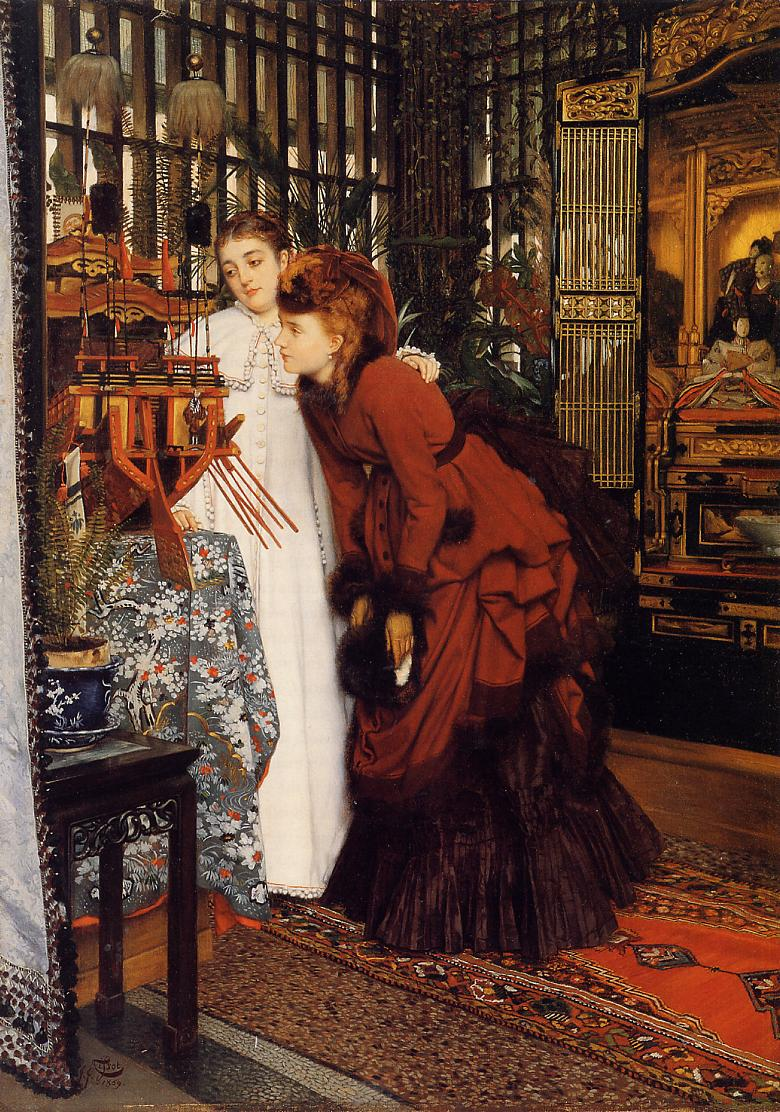
Young Women Looking at Japanese Articles by the painter James Tissot in 1869 is a representation of the popular curiosity about all Japanese items that started with the opening of the country in the Meiji Restoration of the 1860s.

Japonisme (Note: From the French Japonisme, French pronunciation: [ʒa.pɔ.nism]) is a French term that refers to the popularity and influence of Japanese art and design among a number of Western European artists in the nineteenth century following the forced reopening of foreign trade with Japan in 1858. Japonisme was first described by French art critic and collector Philippe Burty in 1872.

While the effects of the trend were likely most pronounced in the visual arts, they extended to architecture, landscaping and gardening, and clothing. Even the performing arts were affected; Gilbert and Sullivan's The Mikado is perhaps the best example.

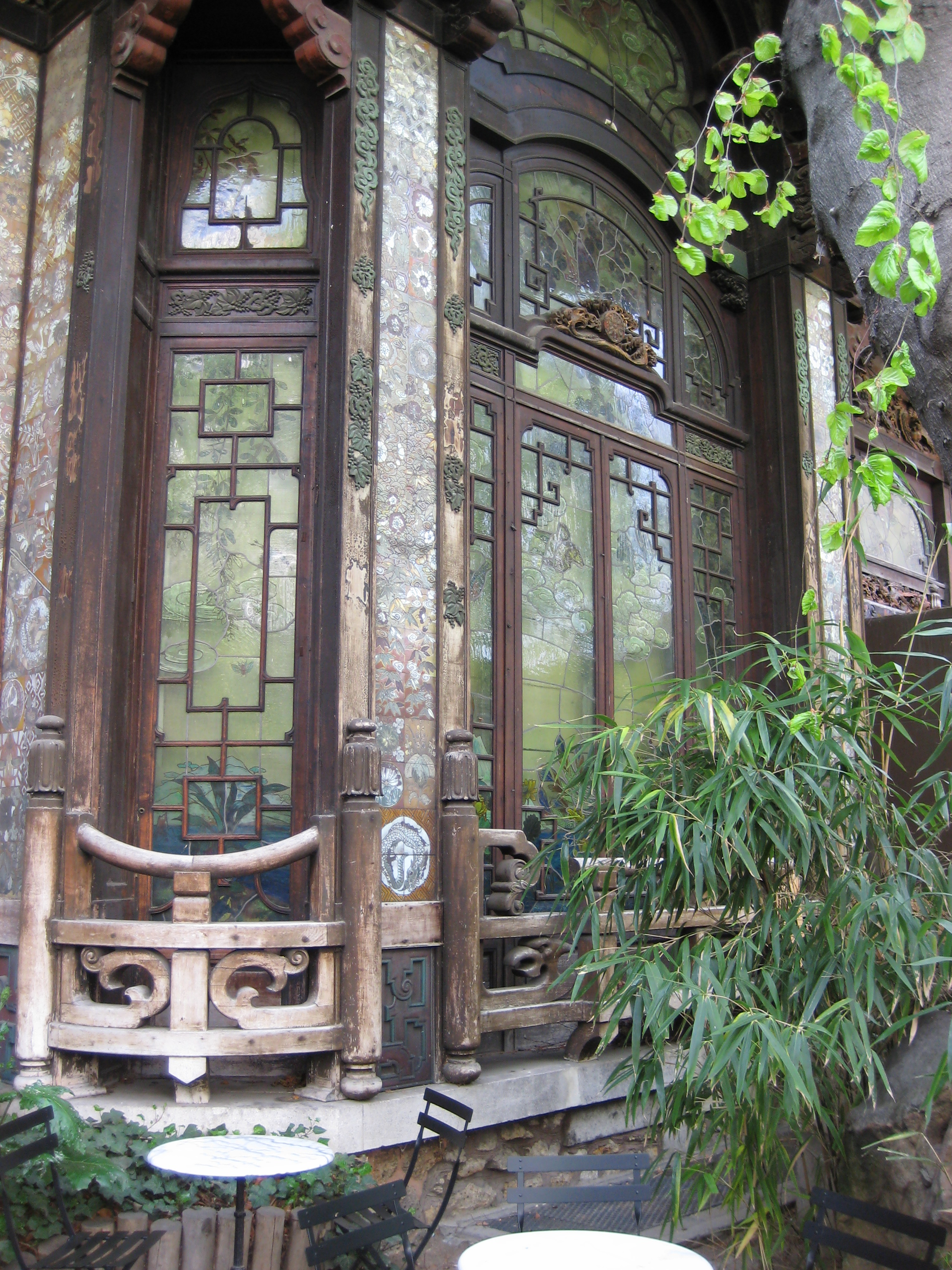
Window of La Pagode (Paris), built in 1896

From the 1860s, ukiyo-e, Japanese woodblock prints, became a source of inspiration for many Western artists. These prints were created for the commercial market in Japan. Although a percentage of prints were brought to the West through Dutch trade merchants, it was not until the 1860s that ukiyo-e prints gained popularity in Europe. Western artists were intrigued by the original use of color and composition. Ukiyo-e prints featured dramatic foreshortening and asymmetrical compositions.

Japanese decorative arts, including ceramics, enamels, metalwork, and lacquerware, were as influential in the West as the graphic arts. During the Meiji era (1868–1912), Japanese pottery was exported around the world. From a long history of making weapons for samurai, Japanese metalworkers had achieved an expressive range of colours by combining and finishing metal alloys. Japanese cloisonné enamel reached its "golden age" from 1890 to 1910, producing items more advanced than ever before. These items were widely visible in nineteenth-century Europe: a succession of world's fairs displayed Japanese decorative art to millions, and it was picked up by galleries and fashionable stores. Writings by critics, collectors, and artists expressed considerable excitement about this "new" art. Collectors including Siegfried Bing and Christopher Dresser displayed and wrote about these works. Thus Japanese styles and themes reappeared in the work of Western artists and craftsmen.

== History ==
=== Seclusion (1639–1858) ===
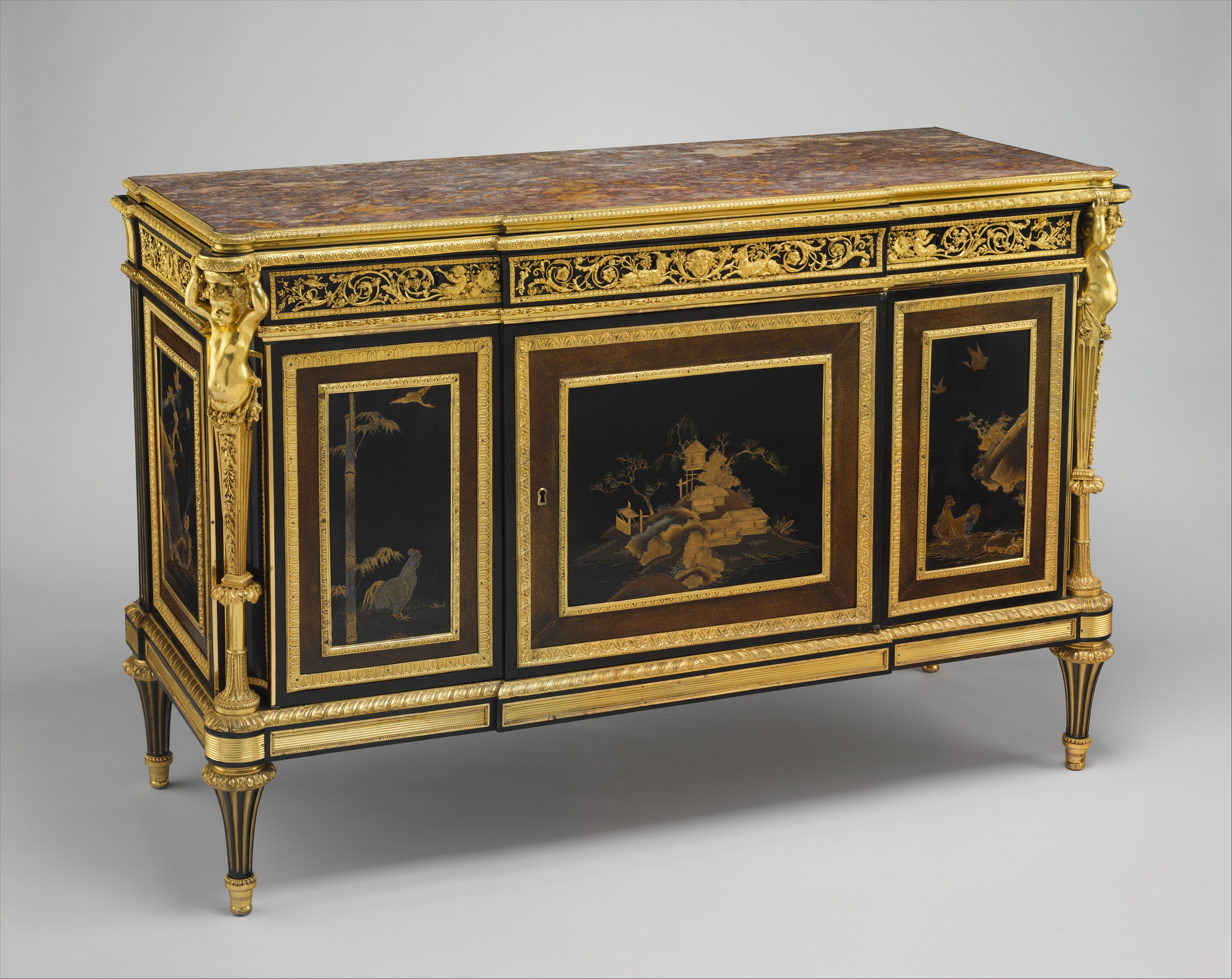
Commode (commode à vantaux) in the Louis XVI style, made in France, using Japanese lacquer panels, c. 1790, Metropolitan Museum of Art, New York City

During most of the Edo period (1603–1867), Japan was in a time of seclusion and only one international port remained active. Tokugawa Iemitsu ordered that an island, Dejima, be built off the shores of Nagasaki from which Japan could receive imports. The Dutch were the only Westerners able to engage in trade with the Japanese, yet this small amount of contact still allowed for Japanese art to influence the West. Every year the Dutch arrived in Japan with fleets of ships filled with Western goods for trade. The cargo included many Dutch treatises on painting and a number of Dutch prints. Shiba Kōkan (1747–1818) was one of the Japanese artists who studied the imports. Kōkan created one of the first etchings in Japan which was a technique he had learned from one of the imported treatises. Kōkan combined the technique of linear perspective, which he learned from a treatise, with his own ukiyo-e styled paintings.

==== Early exports ====
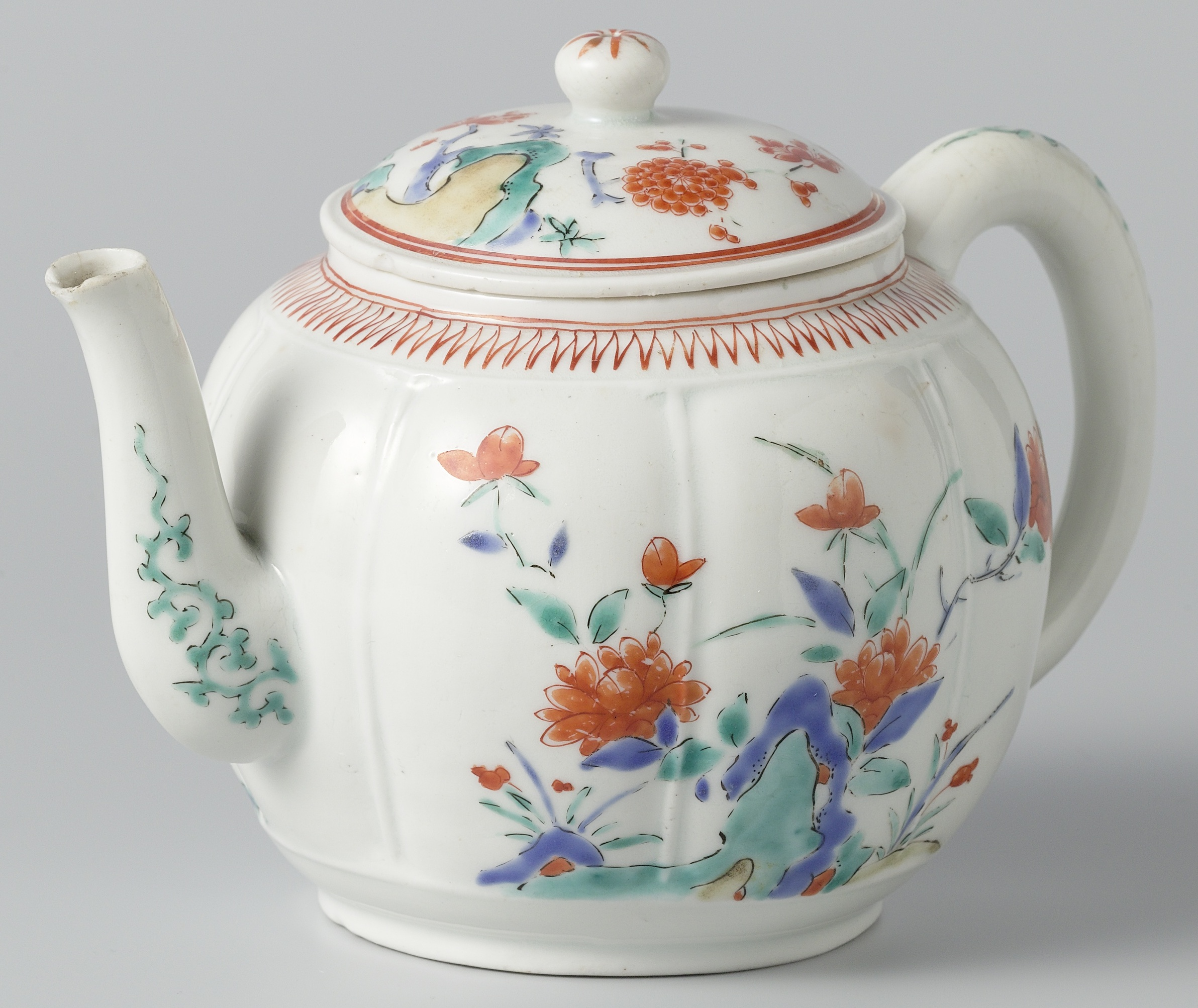
Kakiemon teapot, an example of Japanese export porcelain, 1670–1690, Rijksmuseum, Amsterdam, the Netherlands

The primary Japanese exports were initially silver, which was prohibited after 1668, and gold, mostly in the form of oval coins, which was prohibited after 1763, and later copper in the form of copper bars. Japanese exports eventually decreased and shifted to craftwork such as ceramics, hand fans, paper, furniture, swords, armors, mother-of-pearl objects, folding screens, and lacquerware, which were already being exported.

During the era of seclusion, Japanese goods remained a luxury sought after by European elites. The production of Japanese porcelain increased in the seventeenth century, after Korean potters were brought to the Kyushu area. The immigrants, their descendants, and Japanese counterparts unearthed kaolin clay mines and began to make high quality pottery. The blend of traditions evolved into a distinct Japanese industry with styles such as Imari ware and Kakiemon. They would later influence European and Chinese potters. The exporting of porcelain was further boosted by the effects of the Ming-Qing transition, which immobilized the center of Chinese porcelain production in Jingdezhen for several decades. Japanese potters filled the void making porcelain for European tastes. Porcelain and lacquered objects became the main exports from Japan to Europe. An extravagant way to display porcelain in a home was to create a porcelain room with shelves placed throughout to show off the exotic wares, but the ownership of a few pieces was possible for a wide and increasing social range of the middle class. Marie Antoinette and Maria Theresa are known collectors of Japanese lacquerware, and their collections are often exhibited in the Louvre and the Palace of Versailles. The European imitation of Asian lacquerwork is referred to as Japanning.

=== Re-opening (19th century) ===
During the Kaei era (1848–1854), after more than 200 years of seclusion, foreign merchant ships of various nationalities began to visit Japan. Following the Meiji Restoration in 1868, Japan ended a long period of national isolation and became open to imports from the West, including photography and printing techniques. With this new opening in trade, Japanese art and artifacts began to appear in small curiosity shops in Paris and London. Japonisme began as a craze for collecting Japanese art, particularly ukiyo-e. Some of the first samples of ukiyo-e were seen in Paris.

During this time, European artists were seeking alternatives to the strict European academic methodologies. Around 1856, the French artist Félix Bracquemond encountered a copy of the sketch book Hokusai Manga at the workshop of his printer, Auguste Delâtre. In the years following this discovery, there was an increase of interest in Japanese prints. They were sold in curiosity shops, tea warehouses, and larger shops. Shops such as La Porte Chinoise specialized in the sale of Japanese and Chinese imports. La Porte Chinoise, in particular, attracted artists James Abbott McNeill Whistler, Édouard Manet, and Edgar Degas who drew inspiration from the prints. It and other shops organized gatherings which facilitated the spread of information regarding Japanese art and techniques.

== Artists and Japonisme ==
Ukiyo-e prints were one of the main Japanese influences on Western art. Western artists were inspired by the different uses of compositional space, flattening of planes, and abstract approaches to color. An emphasis on diagonals, asymmetry, and negative space can be seen in the works of Western artists who were influenced by this style.

=== Vincent van Gogh ===
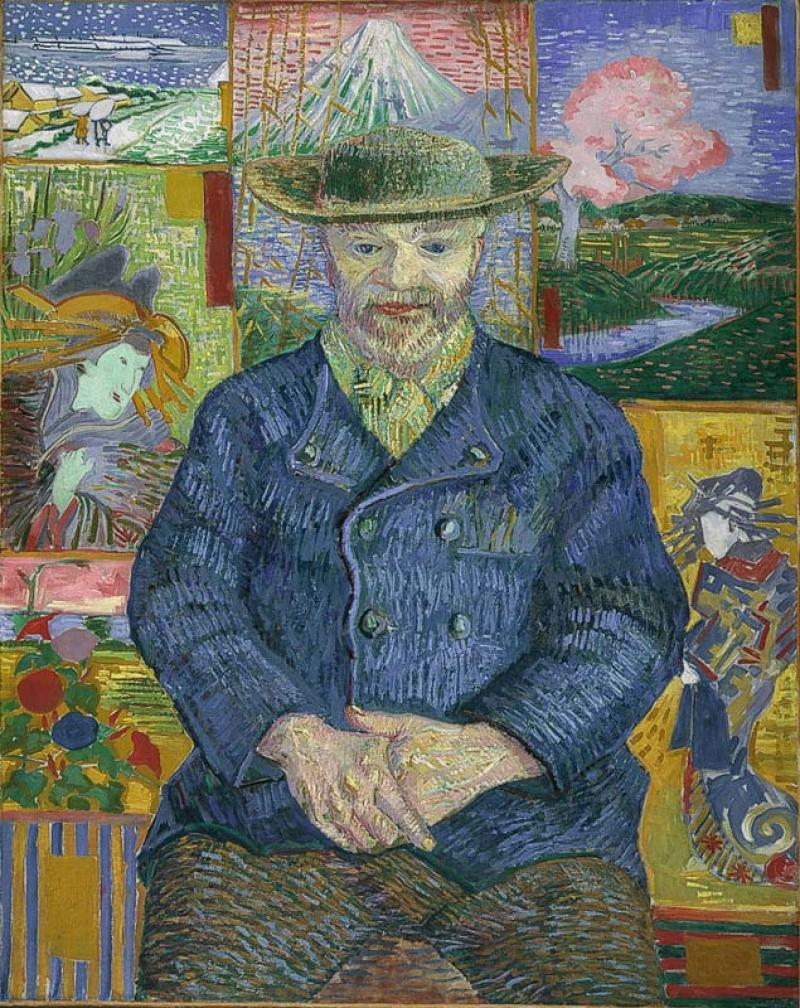
Portrait of Père Tanguy by Vincent van Gogh, an example of Ukiyo-e influence in Western art (1887)

Vincent van Gogh's interest in Japanese prints began when he discovered illustrations by Félix Régamey featured in The Illustrated London News and Le Monde illustré. Régamey created woodblock prints, followed Japanese techniques, and often depicted scenes of Japanese life. Van Gogh used Régamey as a reliable source for the artistic practices and everyday scenes of Japanese life. Beginning in 1885, Van Gogh switched from collecting magazine illustrations, such as Régamey, to collecting ukiyo-e prints which could be bought in small Parisian shops. He shared these prints with his contemporaries and organized a Japanese print exhibition in Paris in 1887.

Van Gogh's Portrait of Père Tanguy (1887) is a portrait of his color merchant, Julien Tanguy. Van Gogh created two versions of this portrait. Both versions feature backdrops of Japanese prints by identifiable artists like Hiroshige and Kunisada. Inspired by Japanese woodblock prints and their colorful palettes, Van Gogh incorporated a similar vibrancy into his own works. He filled the portrait of Tanguy with vibrant colors as he believed that buyers were no longer interested in grey-toned Dutch paintings and that paintings with many colors would be considered modern and desirable.

=== Alfred Stevens ===
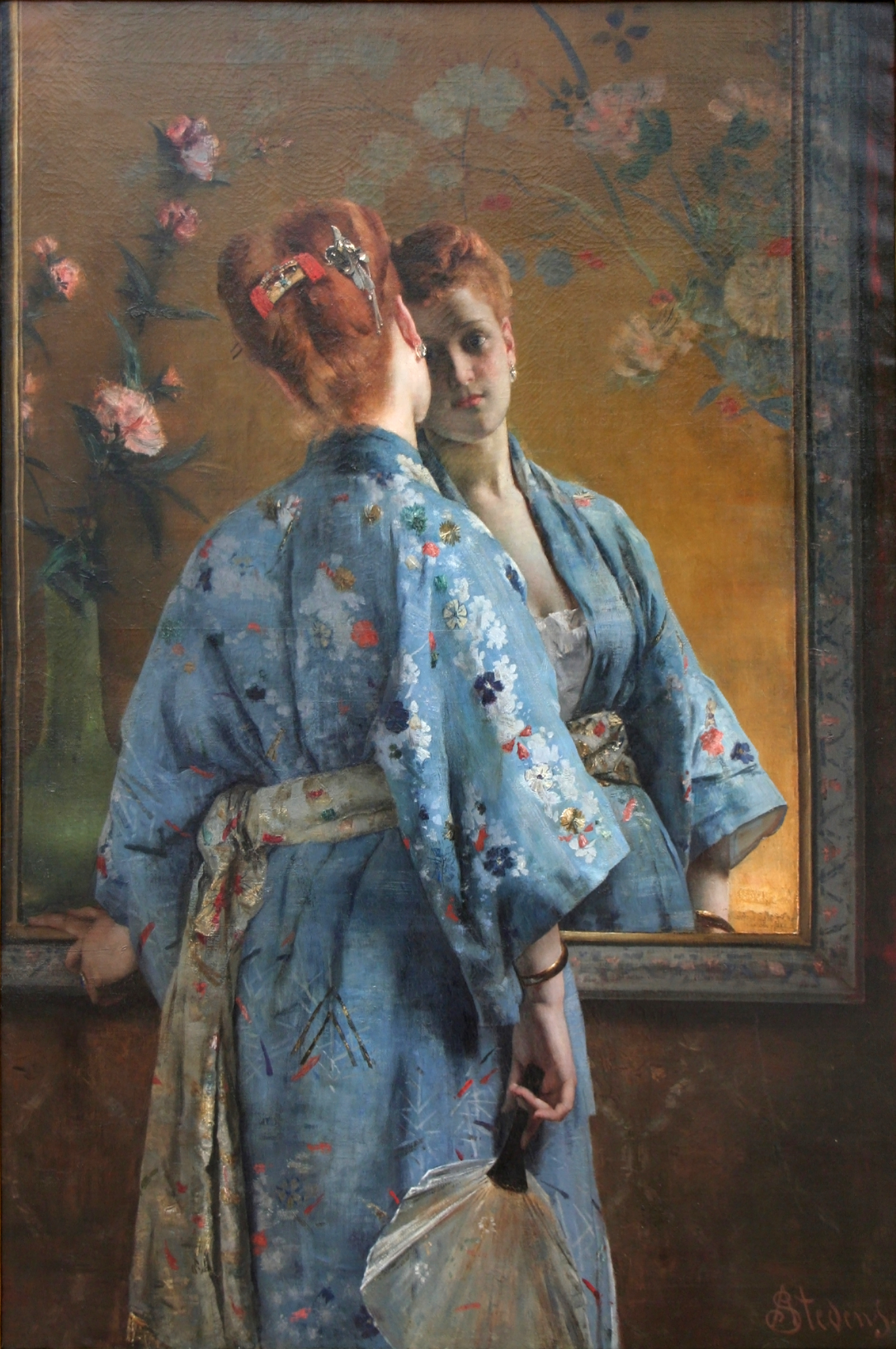
La parisienne japonaise by Alfred Stevens (1872)

The Belgian painter Alfred Stevens was one of the earliest collectors and enthusiasts of Japanese art in Paris. Objects from Stevens' studio illustrate his fascination with Japanese and exotic knick-knacks and furniture. Stevens was close with Manet and to James McNeill Whistler, with whom he shared this interest early on. Many of his contemporaries were similarly enthused, especially after the 1862 International Exhibition in London and the International Exposition of 1867 in Paris, where Japanese art and objects appeared for the first time.

From the mid-1860's, Japonisme became a fundamental element in many of Stevens' paintings. One of his most famous Japonisme-influenced works is La parisienne japonaise (1872). He realized several portraits of young women dressed in kimono, and Japanese elements feature in many other paintings of his, such as the early La Dame en Rose (1866), which combines a view of a fashionably dressed woman in an interior with a detailed examination of Japanese objects, and The Psyché (1871), wherein on a chair there sit Japanese prints, indicating his artistic passion.

=== Edgar Degas ===
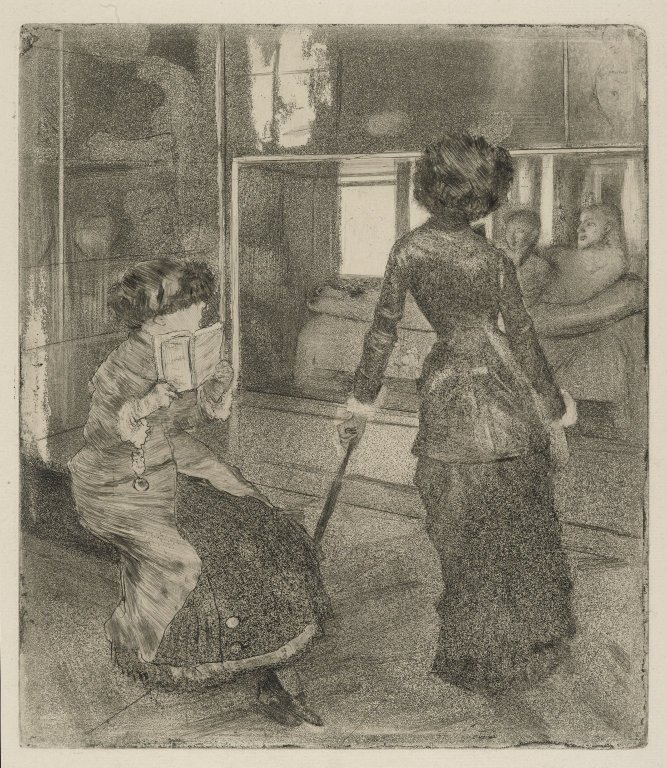
Edgar Degas, Mary Cassatt at the Louvre: The Etruscan Gallery, 1879–1880. Aquatint, drypoint, soft-ground etching, and etching with burnishing, 26.8 × 23.6 cm.

In the 1860s, Edgar Degas began to collect Japanese prints from La Porte Chinoise and other small print shops in Paris. His contemporaries had begun to collect prints as well, which gave him a wide array of sources for inspiration. Among prints shown to Degas was a copy of Hokusai's Manga, which Bracquemond had purchased after seeing it in Delâtre's workshop. The estimated date of Degas' adoption of japonismes into his prints is 1875, and it can be seen in his choice to divide individual scenes by placing barriers vertically, diagonally, and horizontally.

Similar to many Japanese artists, Degas' prints focus on women and their daily routines. The atypical positioning of his female figures and the dedication to reality in his prints aligned him with Japanese printmakers such as Hokusai, Utamaro, and Sukenobu. In Degas' print Mary Cassatt at the Louvre: The Etruscan Gallery (1879–80), the artist uses two figures, one seated and one standing, which is a common composition in Japanese prints. Degas also continued to use lines to create depth and separate space within the scene. His most clear appropriation is of the woman leaning on a closed umbrella, which is borrowed directly from Hokusai's Manga.

=== James McNeill Whistler ===
Japanese art was exhibited in Britain beginning in the early 1850s. These exhibitions featured various Japanese objects, including maps, letters, textiles, and objects from everyday life. These exhibitions served as a source of national pride for Britain and served to create a separate Japanese identity apart from the generalized "Orient" cultural identity.

James Abbott McNeill Whistler was an American artist who worked primarily in Britain. During the late 19th century, Whistler began to reject the Realist style of painting that his contemporaries favored. Instead, he found simplicity and technicality in the Japanese aesthetic. Rather than copying specific artists and artworks, Whistler was influenced by general Japanese methods of articulation and composition, which he integrated into his works.

=== Artists influenced by Japanese art and culture ===
Artist	Date of birth	Date of death	Nationality	Style
Alfred Stevens	1823	1906	Belgian	Realism, Genre painting
James Tissot	1836	1902	French	Genre Art, Realism
James McNeill Whistler	1834	1903	American	Tonalism, Realism, Impressionism
Édouard Manet	1832	1883	French	Realism, Impressionism
Claude Monet	1840	1926	French	Impressionism
Vincent van Gogh	1853	1890	Dutch	Post-Impressionism
Edgar Degas	1834	1917	French	Impressionism
Pierre-Auguste Renoir	1841	1919	French	Impressionism
Camille Pissarro	1830	1903	Danish-French	Impressionism, Post-Impressionism
Paul Gauguin	1848	1903	French	Post-Impressionism, Primitivism
Mortimer Menpes	1855	1938	Australian	Aestheticism
Henri de Toulouse-Lautrec	1864	1901	French	Post-Impressionism, Art Nouveau
Mary Cassatt	1844	1926	American	Impressionism
George Hendrik Breitner	1857	1923	Dutch	Amsterdam Impressionism
Bertha Lum	1869	1954	American	Japanese Styled Prints
William Bradley	1801	1857	English	Portrait
Aubrey Beardsley	1872	1898	English	Art Nouveau, Aestheticism
Arthur Wesley Dow	1857	1922	American	Arts and Crafts Revival, Japanese Styled Prints
Gustave Léonard de Jonghe	1829	1893	Belgian	Social Realism, Realism, Orientalism
Alphonse Mucha	1860	1939	Czech	Art Nouveau
Gustav Klimt	1862	1918	Austrian	Art Nouveau, Symbolism
Pierre Bonnard	1867	1947	French	Post-Impressionism
Frank Lloyd Wright	1867	1959	American	Prairie School
Charles Rennie Mackintosh	1868	1928	Scottish	Symbolism, Arts and Crafts, Art Nouveau, Glasgow Style
Louis Comfort Tiffany	1848	1933	American	Jewelry and glass designer
Helen Hyde	1868	1919	American	Japanese Styled Prints
Georges Ferdinand Bigot	1860	1927	French	Cartoon
Margaret Macdonald Mackintosh	1864	1933	Scottish	Symbolism, Arts and Crafts, Art Nouveau, Glasgow Style

== Theater ==
The first popular stagings of Asia were depictions of Japan from England. The comic opera Kosiki (originally titled The Mikado but renamed after protest from Japan) was written in 1876. In 1885, Gilbert and Sullivan, apparently less concerned about Japanese perceptions, premiered their Mikado. This comic opera enjoyed immense popularity throughout Europe where seventeen companies performed it 9,000 times within two years of its premiere. Translated into German in 1887, The Mikado remained the most popular drama in Germany throughout the 1890s. In the wake of this popularity, comedies set in Asia and featuring comic Asian figures appeared in rapid succession, both in comic opera and drama.

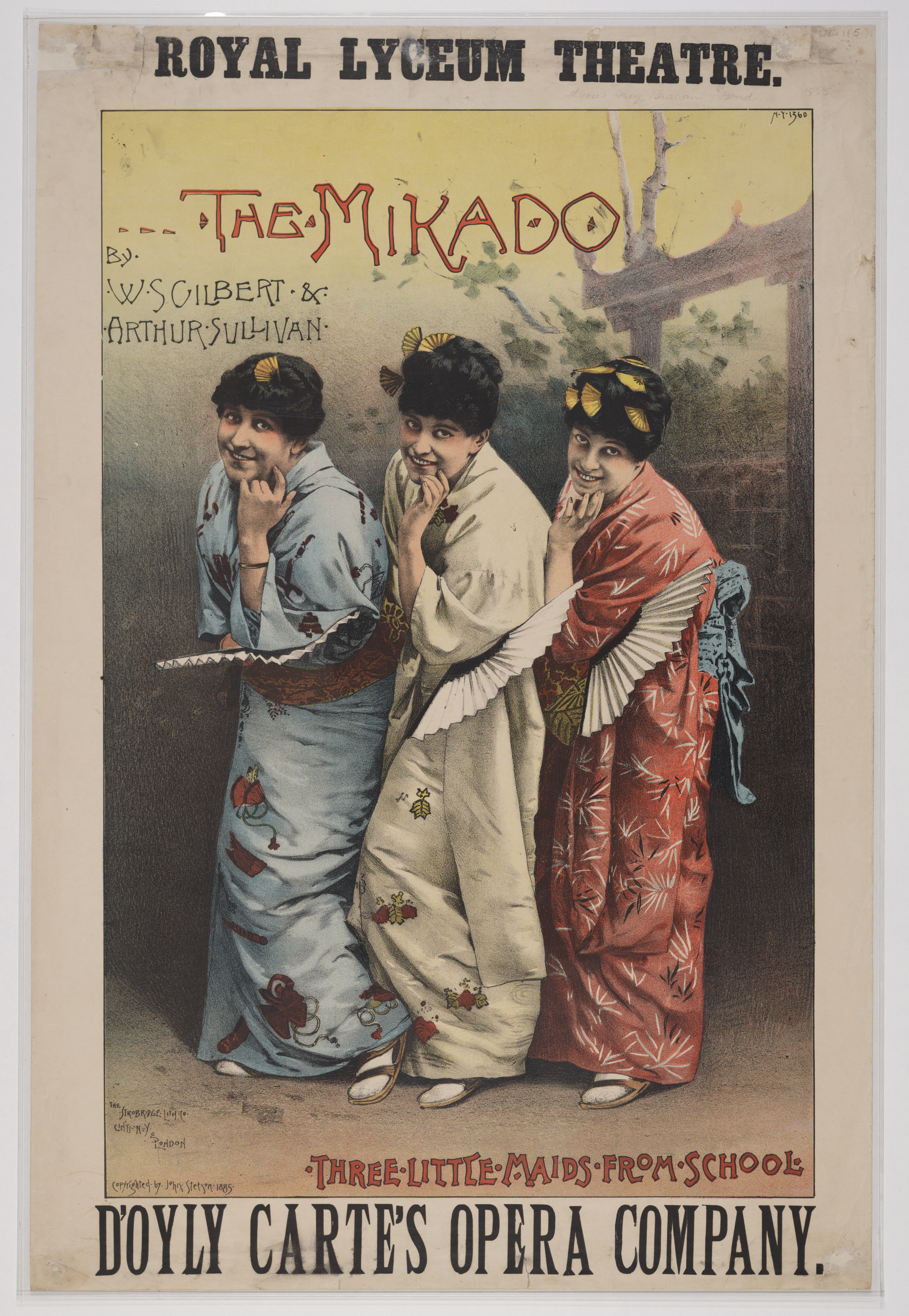
Advertising poster for the comic opera The Mikado, which was set in Japan (1885)

The successor to The Mikado as Europe's most popular Japan drama, Sidney Jones' opera The Geisha (1896) added the title character to the stock characters representing Japan, the figure of the geisha belongs to the "objects" which in and of themselves meant Japan in Germany and throughout the West. The period from 1904 to 1918 saw a European boom in geisha dramas. The most famous of these was, Puccini's opera Madama Butterfly. In 1900, Puccini saw a staging of David Belasco's play of the same name and reportedly found it so moving that he wept. The popularity of the opera brought on a slew of Madame Something or Others, including Madames Cherry, Espirit, Flott, Flirt, Wig-Wag, Leichtsinn, and Tip Top, all of whom appeared around 1904 and disappeared relatively quickly. They were not without lasting effect, however, and the geisha had established herself among the scrolls, jade, and images of Mount Fuji that signified Japan to the West. Much as this human figure of the geisha was reduced to the level of other objects signifying Japan in the drama, Japanese performers in Germany served German play wrights in their quest to renew the German drama. Just as ukiyo-e had proven useful in France, severed from any understanding of Japan, the troupes of Japanese actors and dancers that toured Europe provided materials for "a new way of dramatizing" on stage. Ironically, the popularity and influence of these Japanese dramas had a great deal to do with the westernization of the Japanese theater in general and of the pieces performed in Europe in particular.

Invented for the Kabuki theatre in Japan in the 18th century, the revolving stage was introduced into Western theater at the Residenz theatre in Munich in 1896 under the influence of japonism fever. The Japanese influence on German drama first appeared in stage design. Karl Lautenschlager adopted the Kabuki revolving stage in 1896 and ten years later Max Reinhardt employed it in the premiere of Frühlings Erwachen by Frank Wedekind. Soon this revolving stage was a trend in Berlin. Another adaptation of the Kabuki stage popular among German directors was the Blumensteg, a jutting extension of the stage into the audience. The European acquaintance with Kabuki came either from travels in Japan or from texts, but also from Japanese troupes touring Europe. In 1893, Kawakami Otojiro and his troupe of actors arrived in Paris, returning again in 1900 and playing in Berlin in 1902. Kawakami's troop performed two pieces, Kesa and Shogun, both of which were westernized and were performed without music and with the majority of the dialogue eliminated. This being the case, these performances tended toward pantomime and dance. Dramatists and critics quickly latched on to what they saw as a “re-theatricalization of the theater.” Among the actors in these plays was Sada Yacco, first Japanese star in Europe, who influenced pioneers of modern dance such as Loie Fuller and Isadora Duncan; she performed for Queen Victoria in 1900, and enjoyed the status of a European star.

== Japanese gardens ==
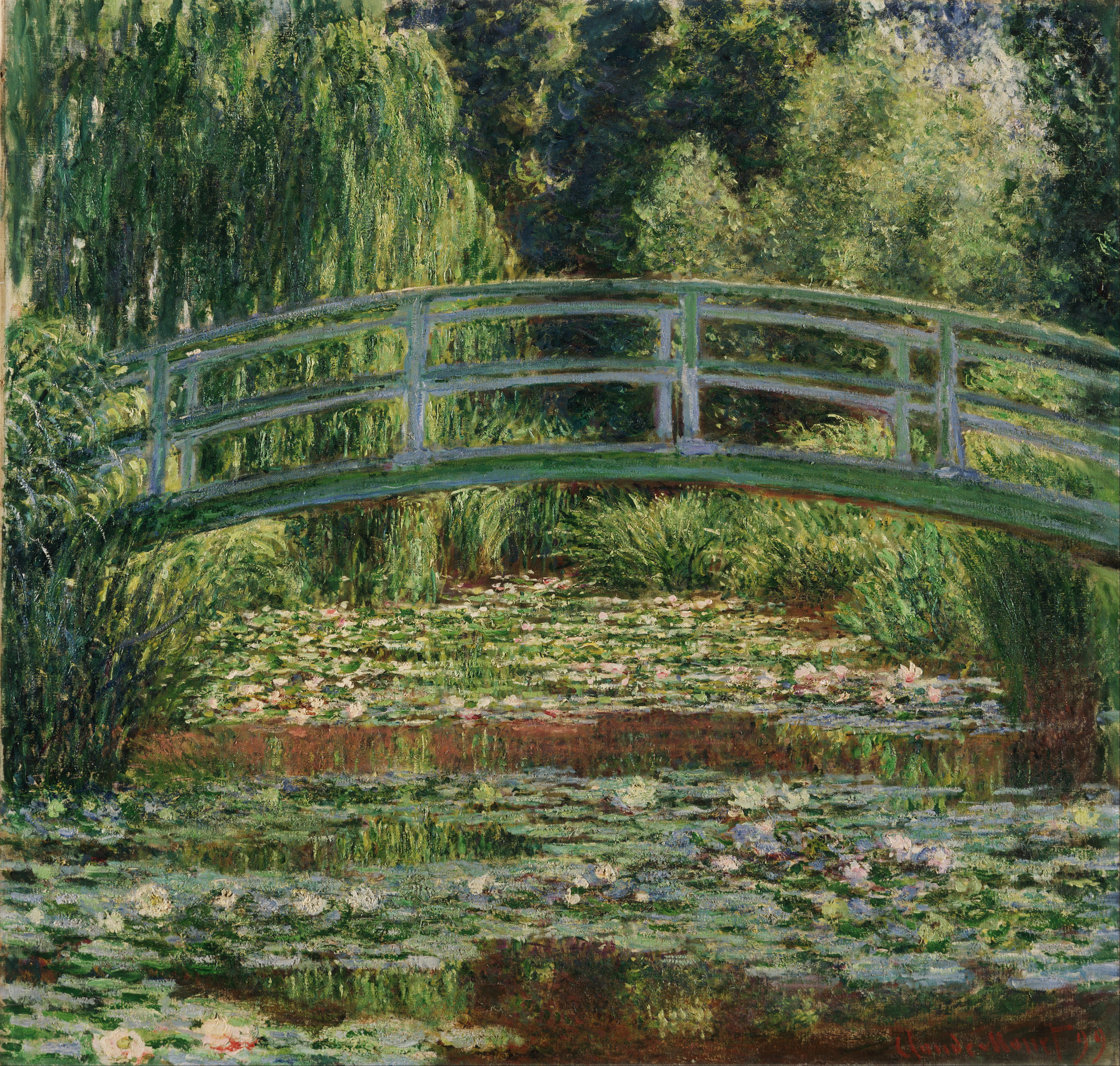
Claude Monet's garden in Giverny with the Japanese footbridge and the water lily pool (1899)

The aesthetic of Japanese gardens was introduced to the English-speaking world by Josiah Conder's Landscape Gardening in Japan (Kelly & Walsh, 1893), which sparked the first Japanese gardens in the West. A second edition was published in 1912. Conder's principles have sometimes proved hard to follow:

Robbed of its local garb and mannerisms, the Japanese method reveals aesthetic principles applicable to the gardens of any country, teaching, as it does, how to convert into a poem or picture a composition which, with all its variety of detail, otherwise lacks unity and intent.

Tassa (Saburo) Eida created several influential gardens, two for the Japan–British Exhibition in London in 1910 and one built over four years for William Walker, 1st Baron Wavertree. The latter can still be visited at the Irish National Stud.

Samuel Newsom's Japanese Garden Construction (1939) offered Japanese aesthetics as a corrective in the construction of rock gardens, which owed their quite separate origins in the West to the mid-19th century desire to grow alpines in an approximation of Alpine scree. According to the Garden History Society, Japanese landscape gardener Seyemon Kusumoto was involved in the development of around 200 gardens in the UK. In 1937, he exhibited a rock garden at the Chelsea Flower Show, and worked on the Burngreave Estate at Bognor Regis, a Japanese garden at Cottered in Hertfordshire, and courtyards at Du Cane Court in London.

The impressionist painter Claude Monet modelled parts of his garden in Giverny after Japanese elements, such as the bridge over the lily pond, which he painted numerous times. In this series, by detailing just on a few select points such as the bridge or the lilies, he was influenced by traditional Japanese visual methods found in ukiyo-e prints, of which he had a large collection. He also planted a large number of native Japanese species to give it a more exotic feeling.

== Museums ==
In the United States, the fascination with Japanese art extended to collectors and museums creating significant collections which still exist and have influenced many generations of artists. The epicenter was in Boston, likely due to Isabella Stewart Gardner, a pioneering collector of Asian art. As a result, the Museum of Fine Arts, Boston now claims to house the finest collection of Japanese art outside Japan. The Freer Gallery of Art and the Arthur M. Sackler Gallery house the largest Asian art research library in the United States, where they house Japanese art together with the Japanese-influenced works of Whistler.

== Gallery ==
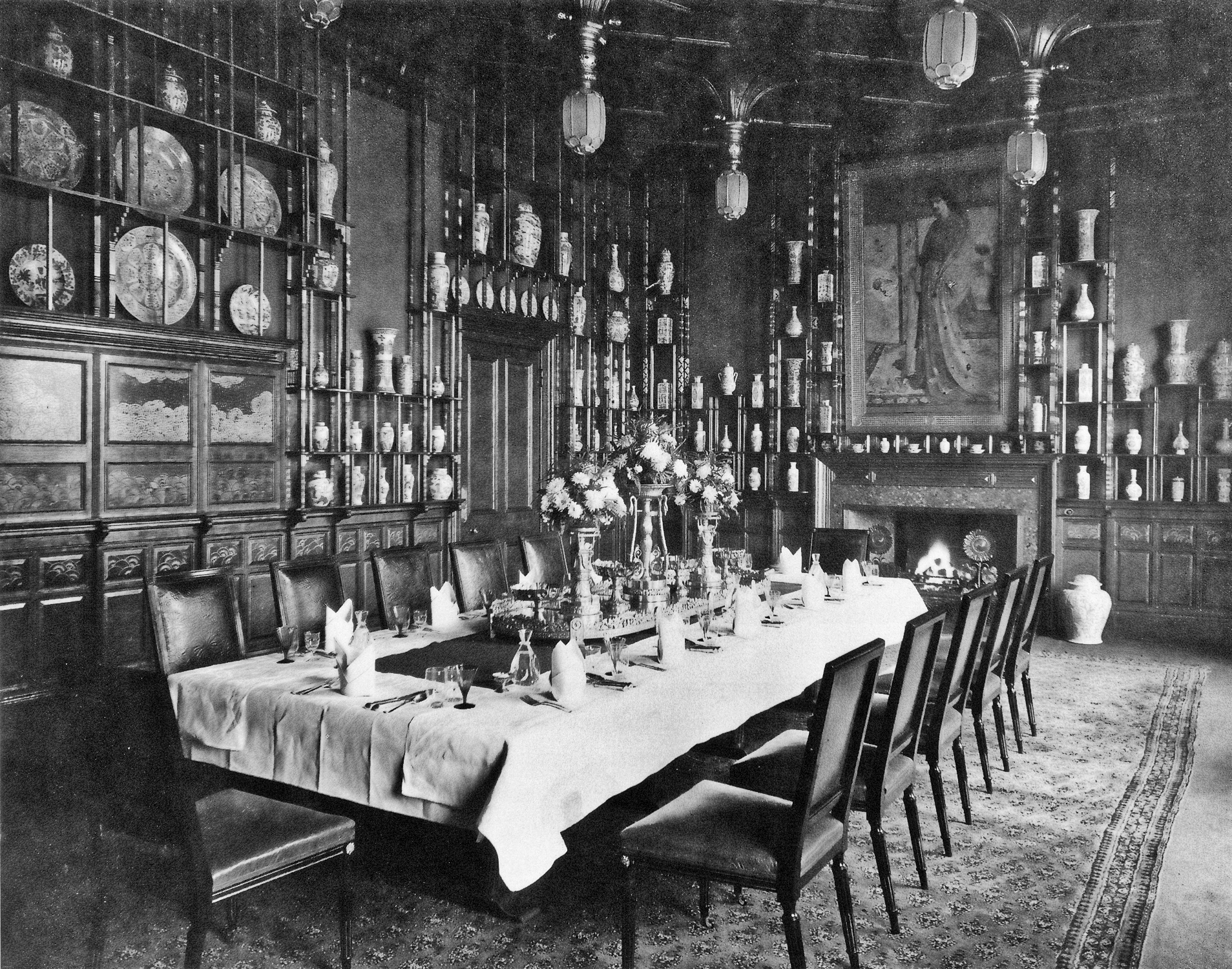
James McNeill Whistler, The Peacock Room, 1876–1877

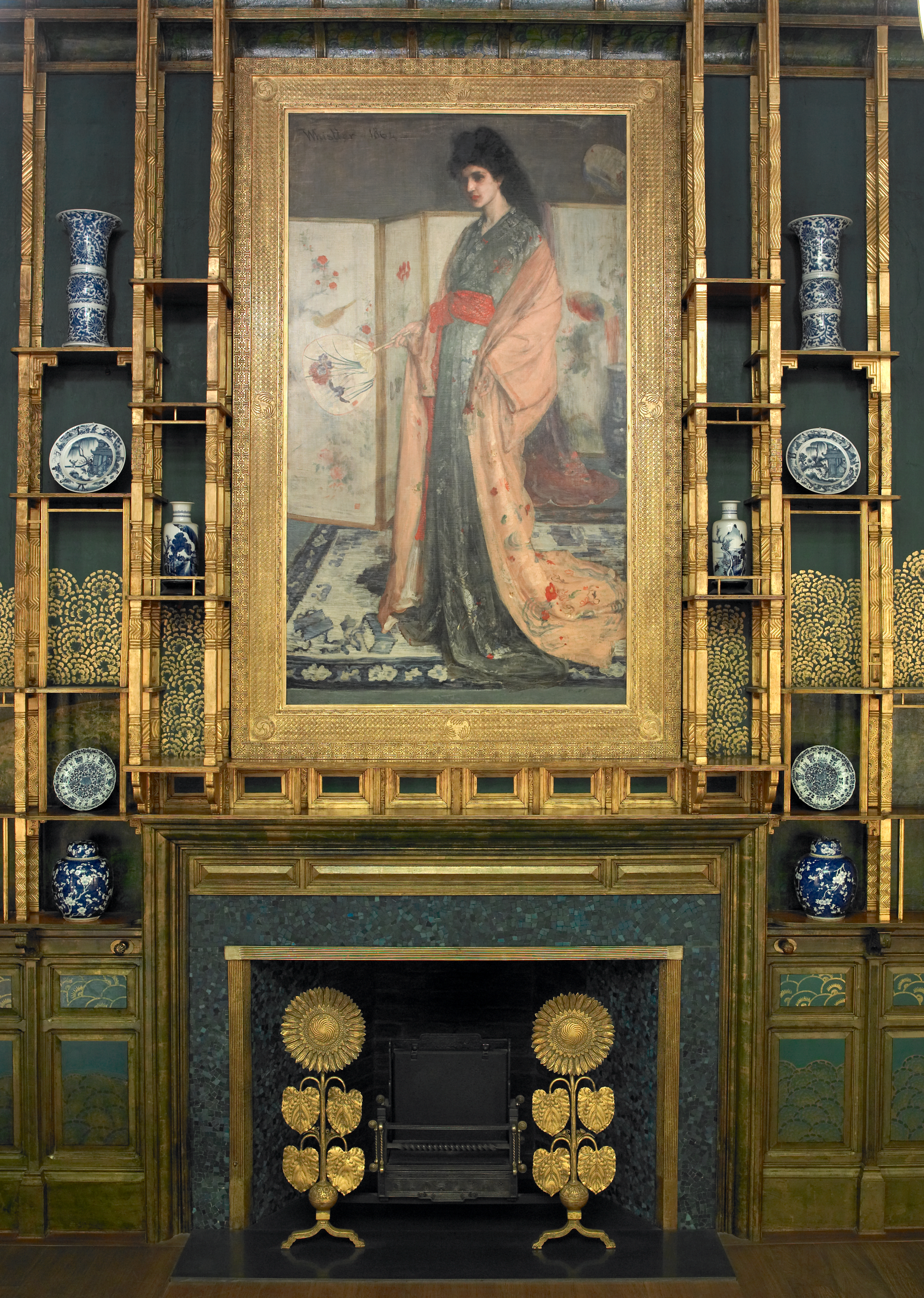
James McNeill Whistler, The Princess from the Land of Porcelain, 1863–1865

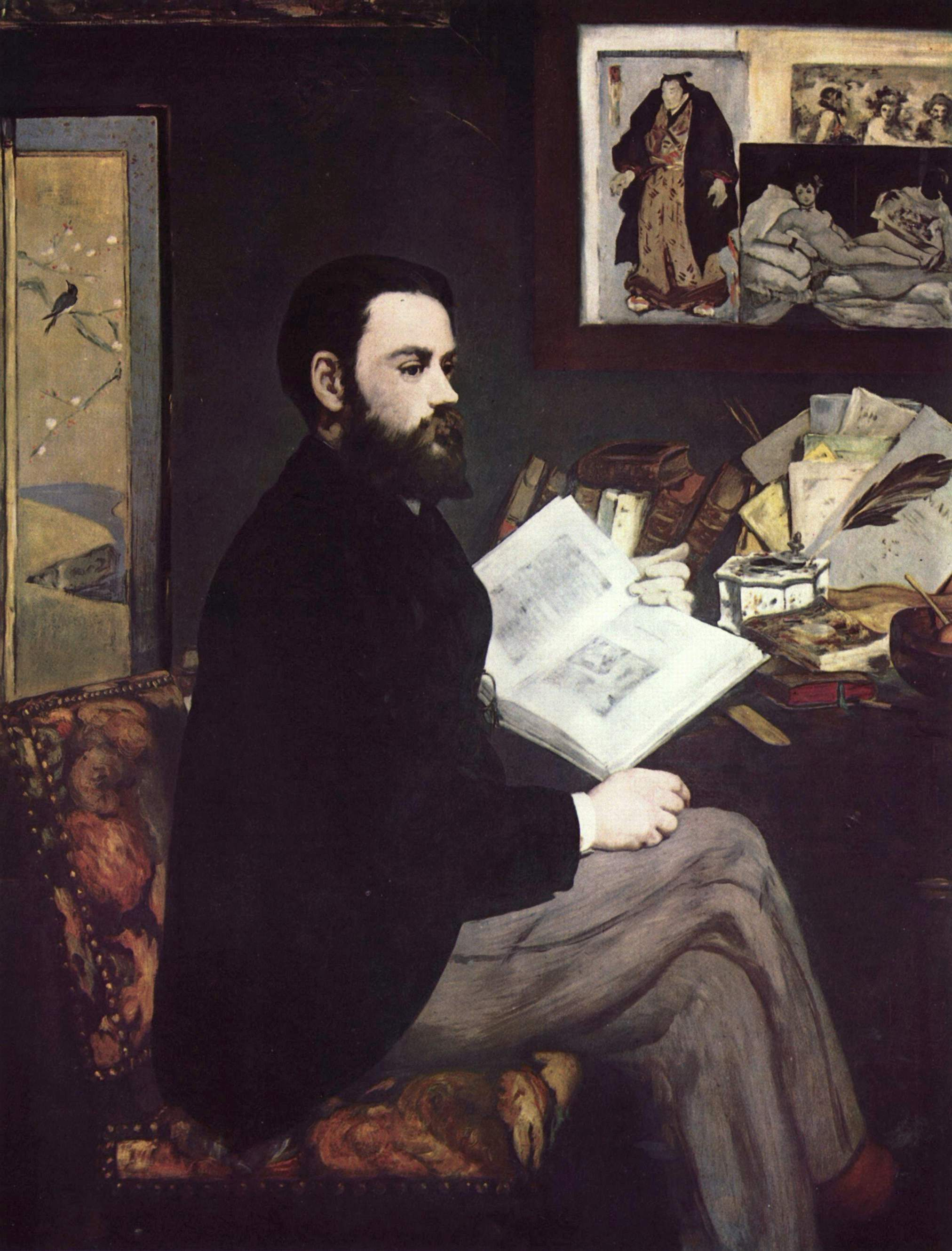
Édouard Manet, Portrait of Émile Zola, 1868

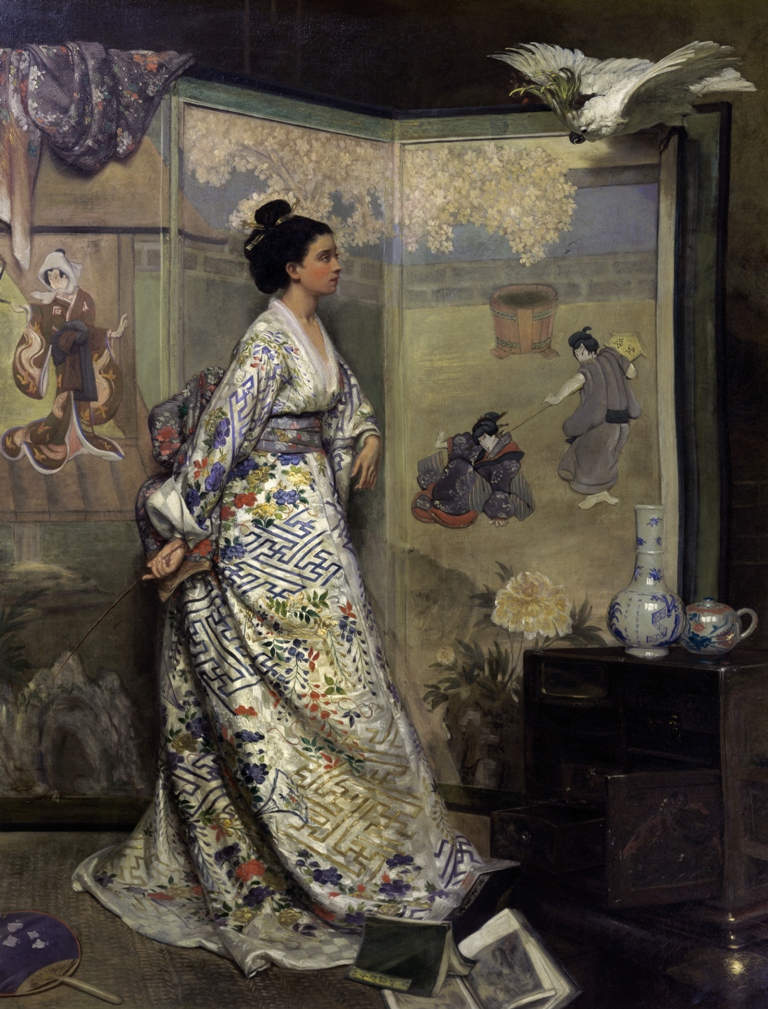
Gustave Léonard de Jonghe, The Japanese Fan, c. 1865

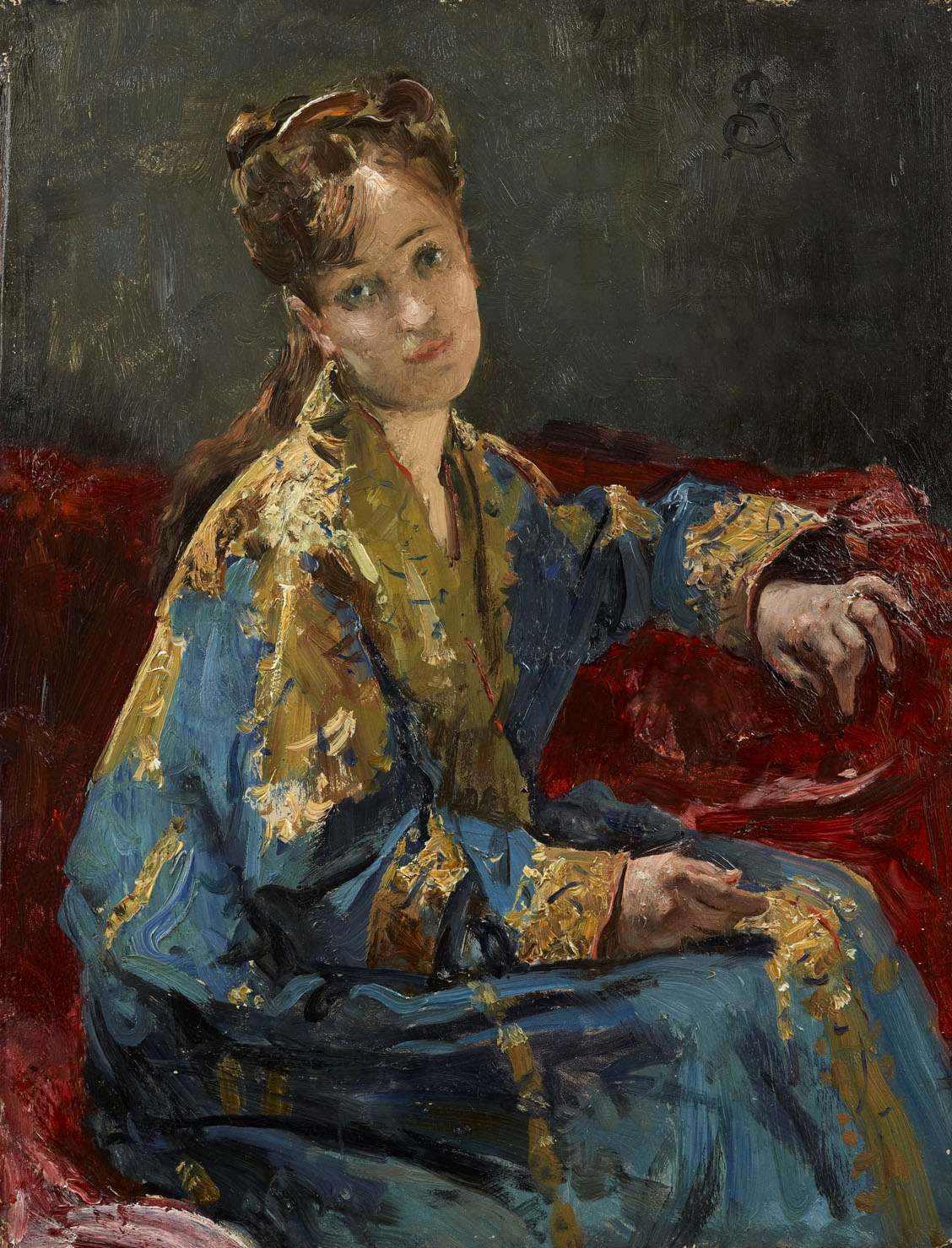
Alfred Stevens, Girl Wearing a Kimono, 1872

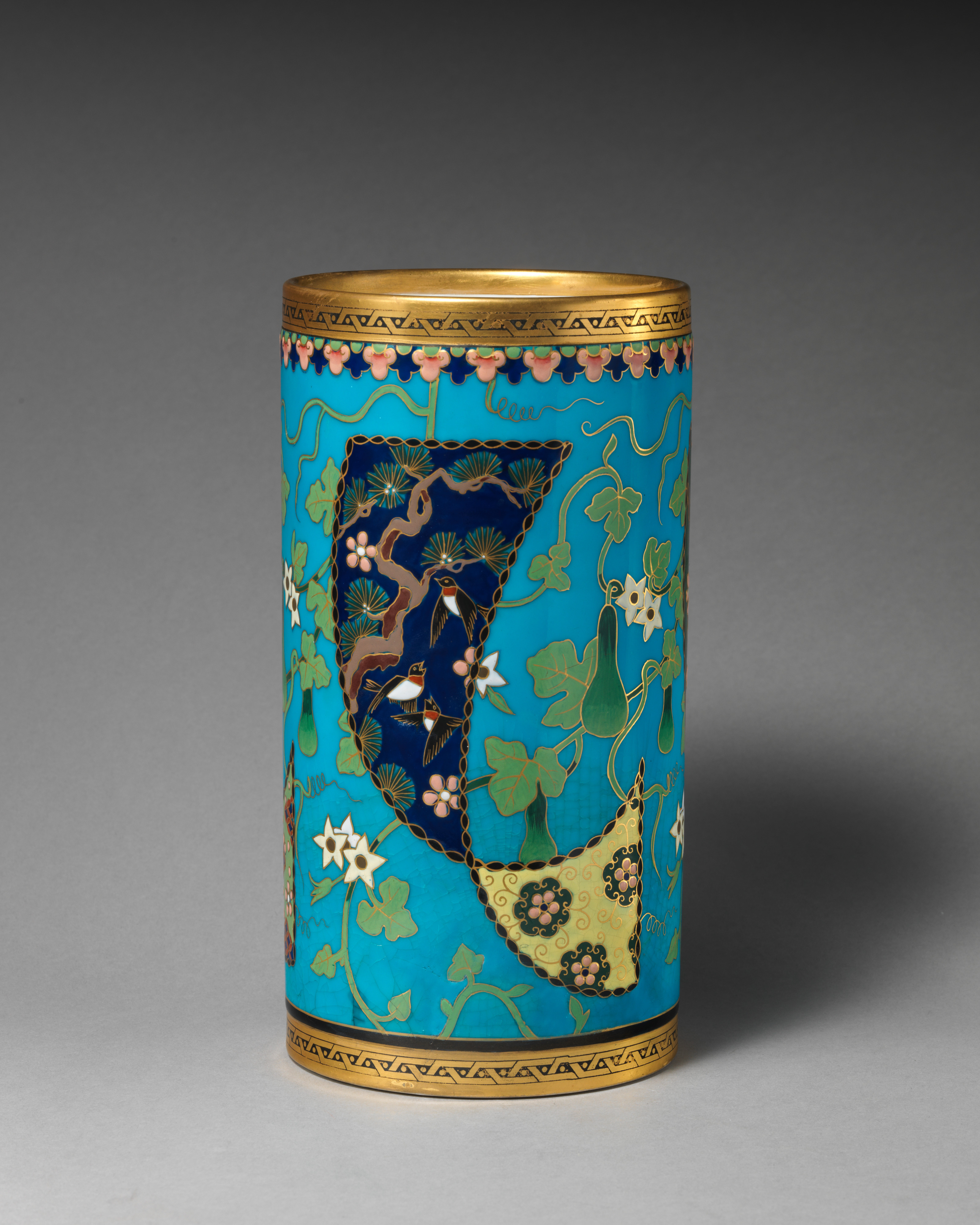
Large spill vase, c. 1872

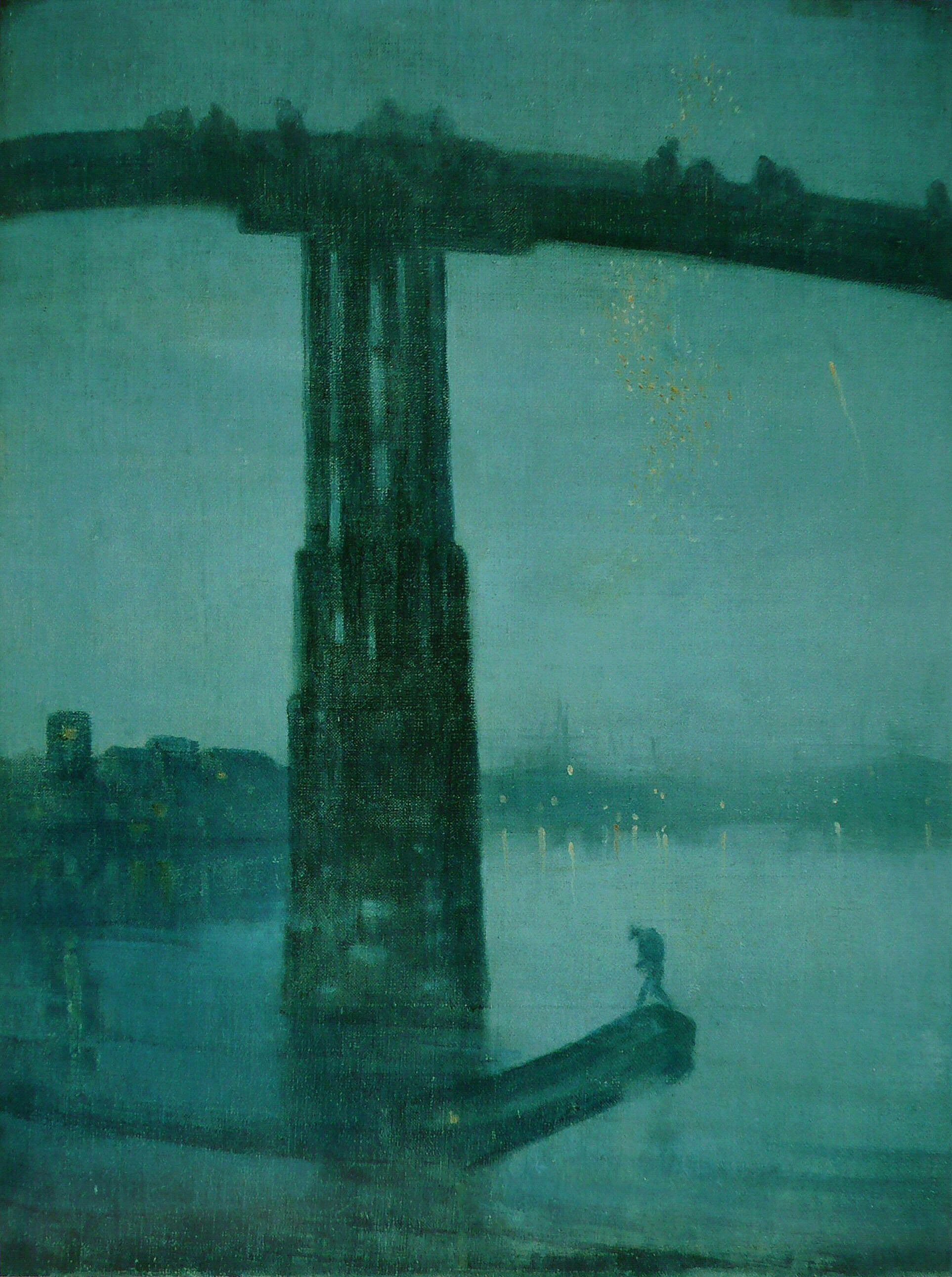
James McNeill Whistler, Nocturne in Blue and Gold: Old Battersea Bridge, 1872–1875

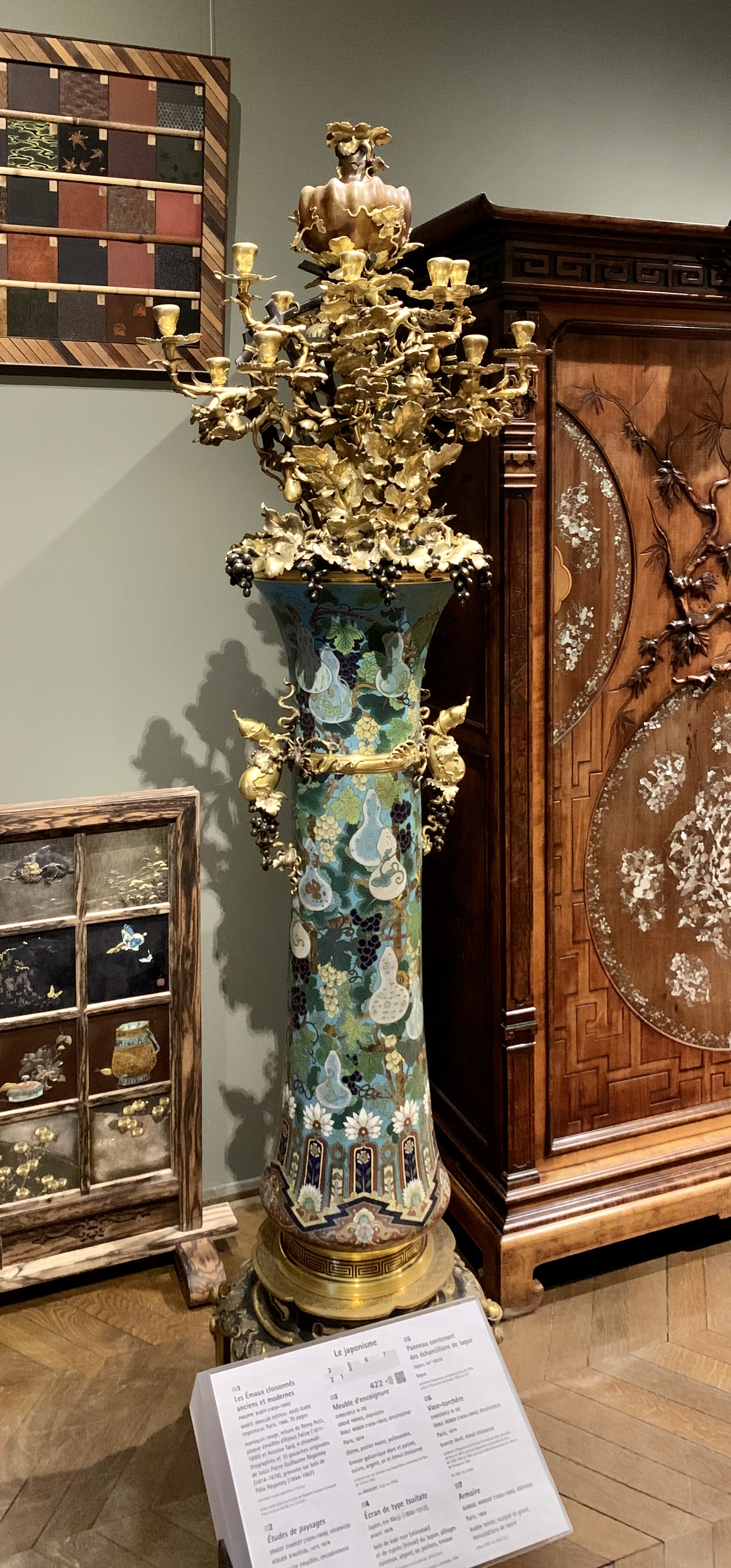
Christofle & Cie and Émile Reiber, chandelier vase, 1874

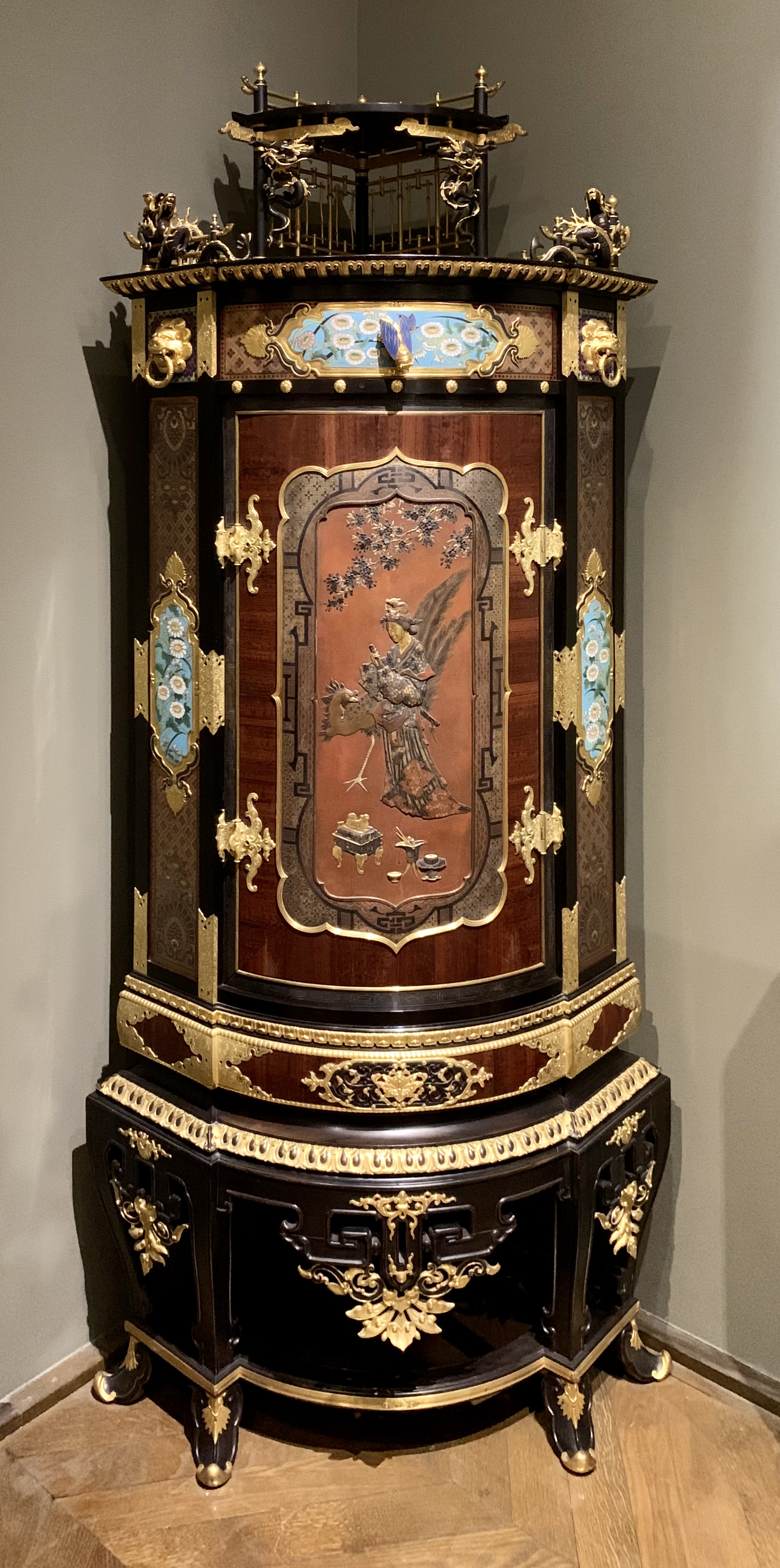
Émile Reiber, Grohé Brothers, Eugène Capy, Antoine Tard, and Christofle & Cie, corner cabinet, 1874–1878

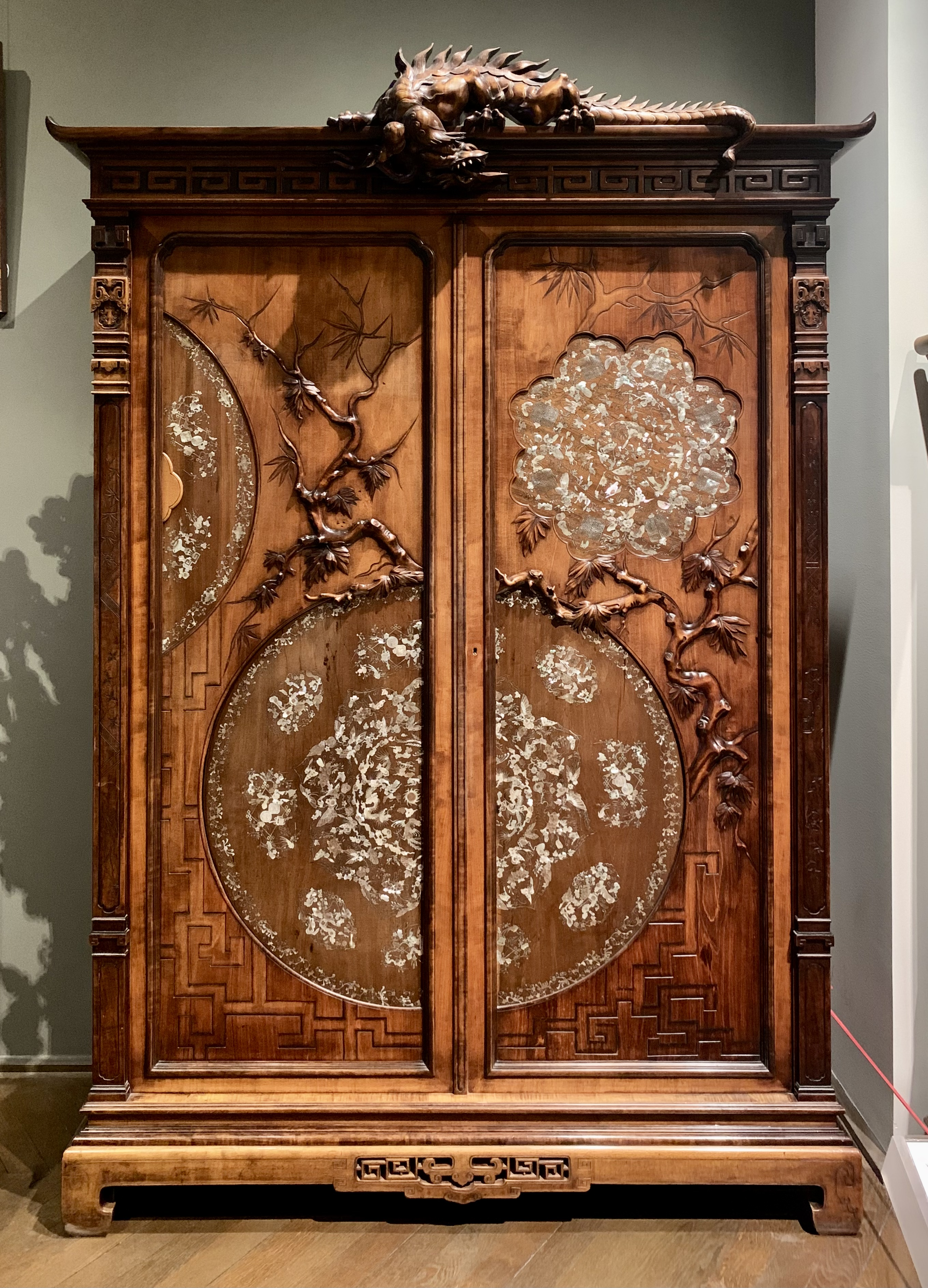
Léon Dromard, cabinet, c. 1874–1889

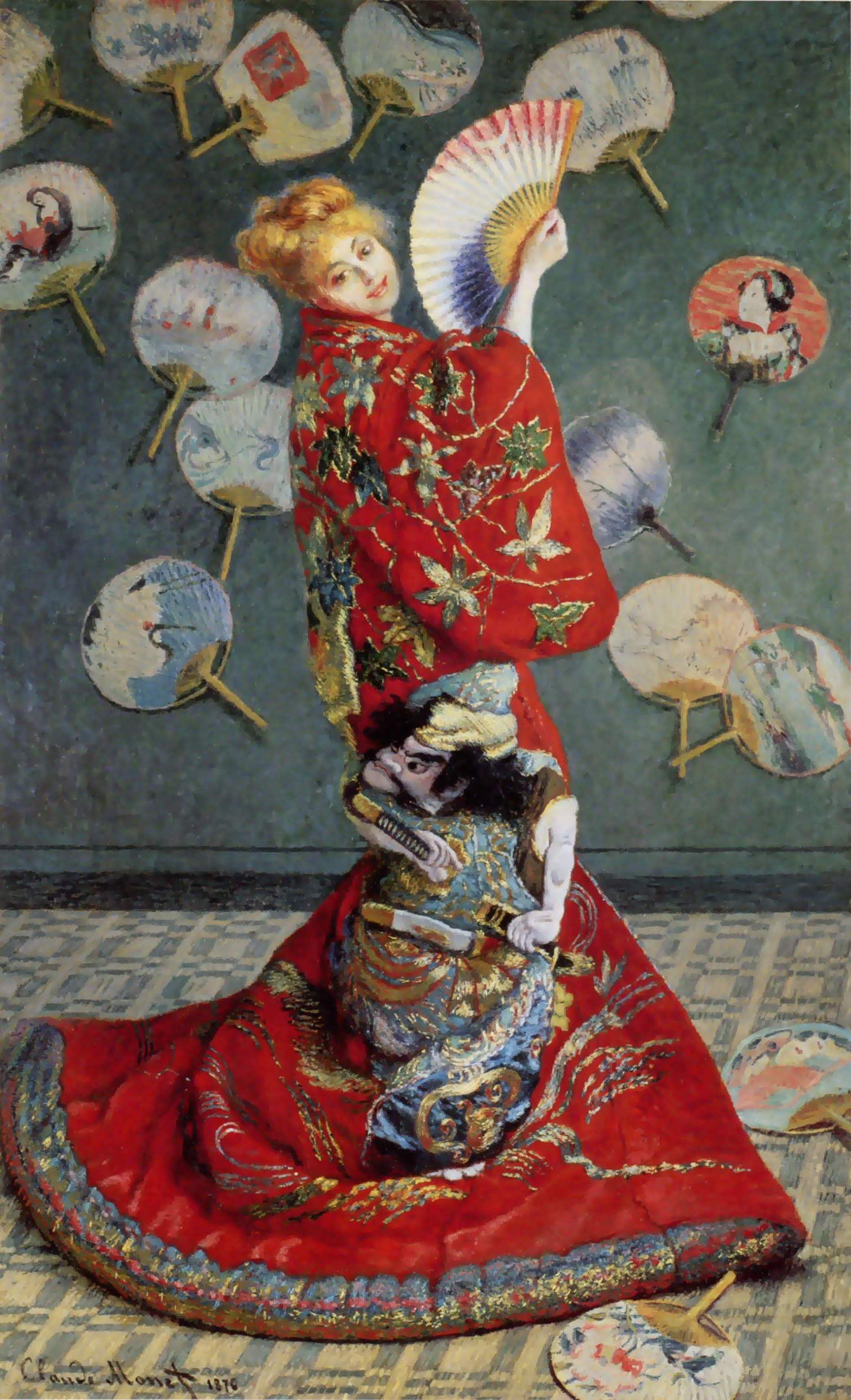
Claude Monet, Madame Monet en costume Japonais, 1875

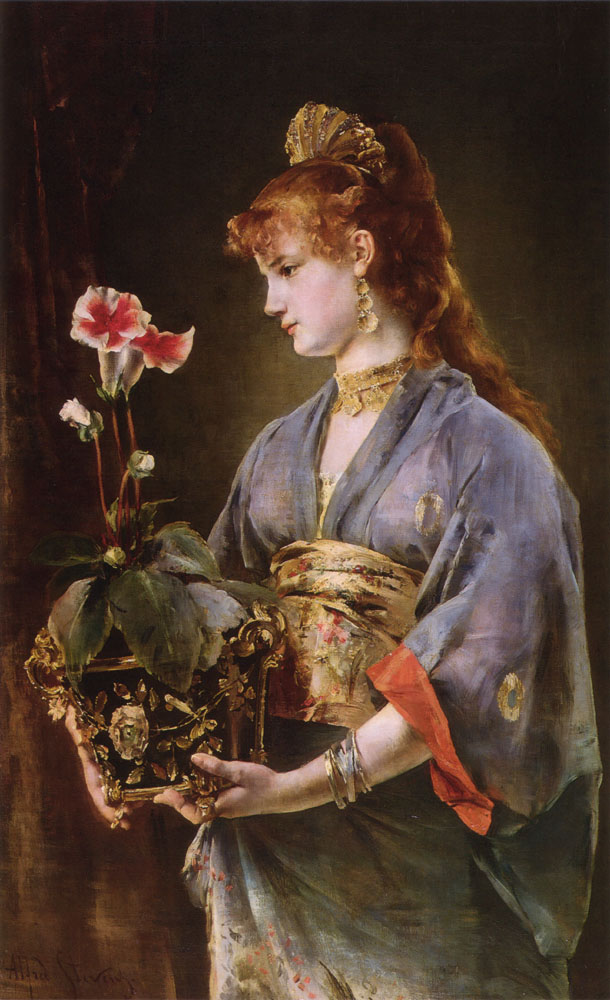
Alfred Stevens, Yamatori, c. 1878

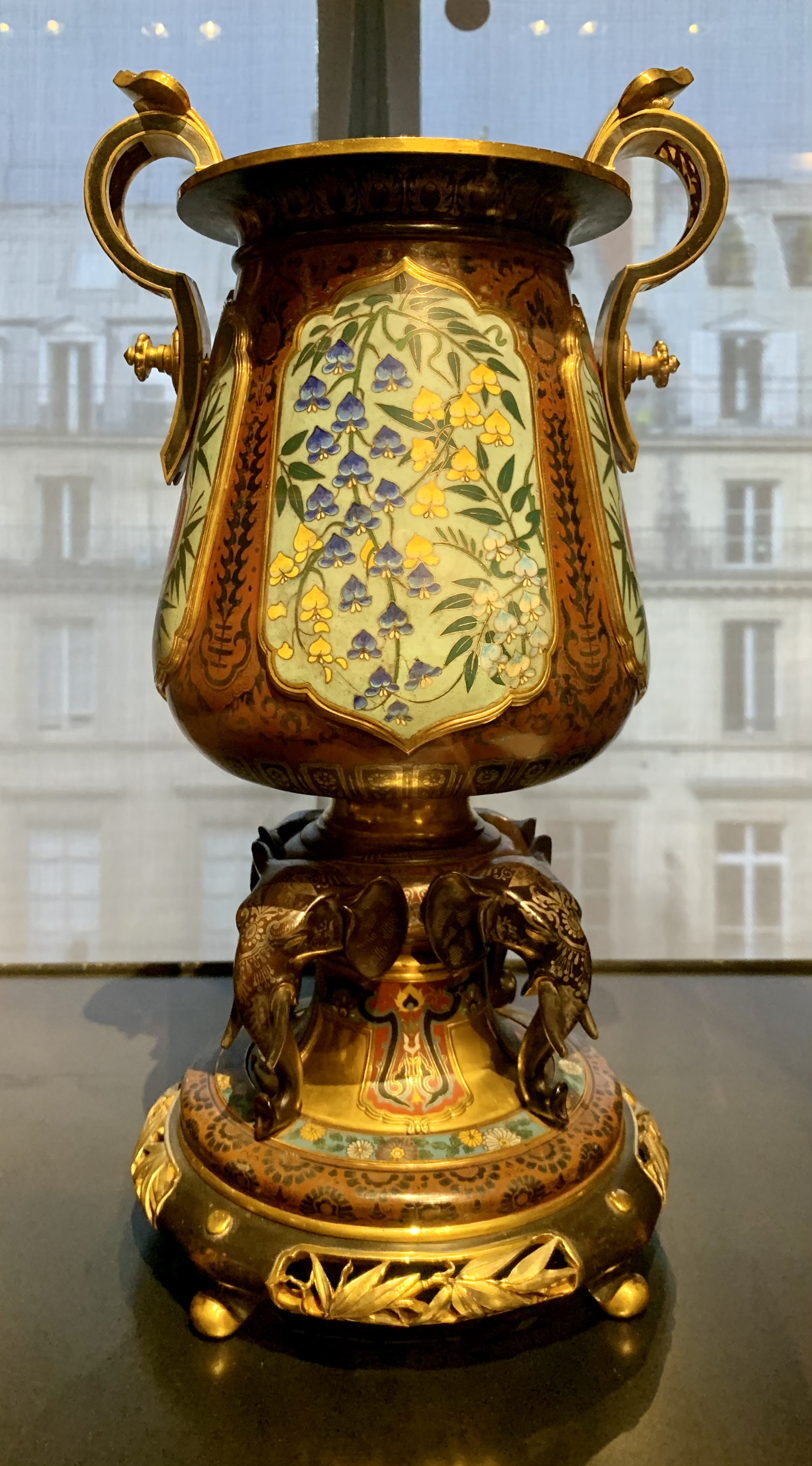
Christofle & Cie and Émile Reiber, «Elephant» Vase, 1878

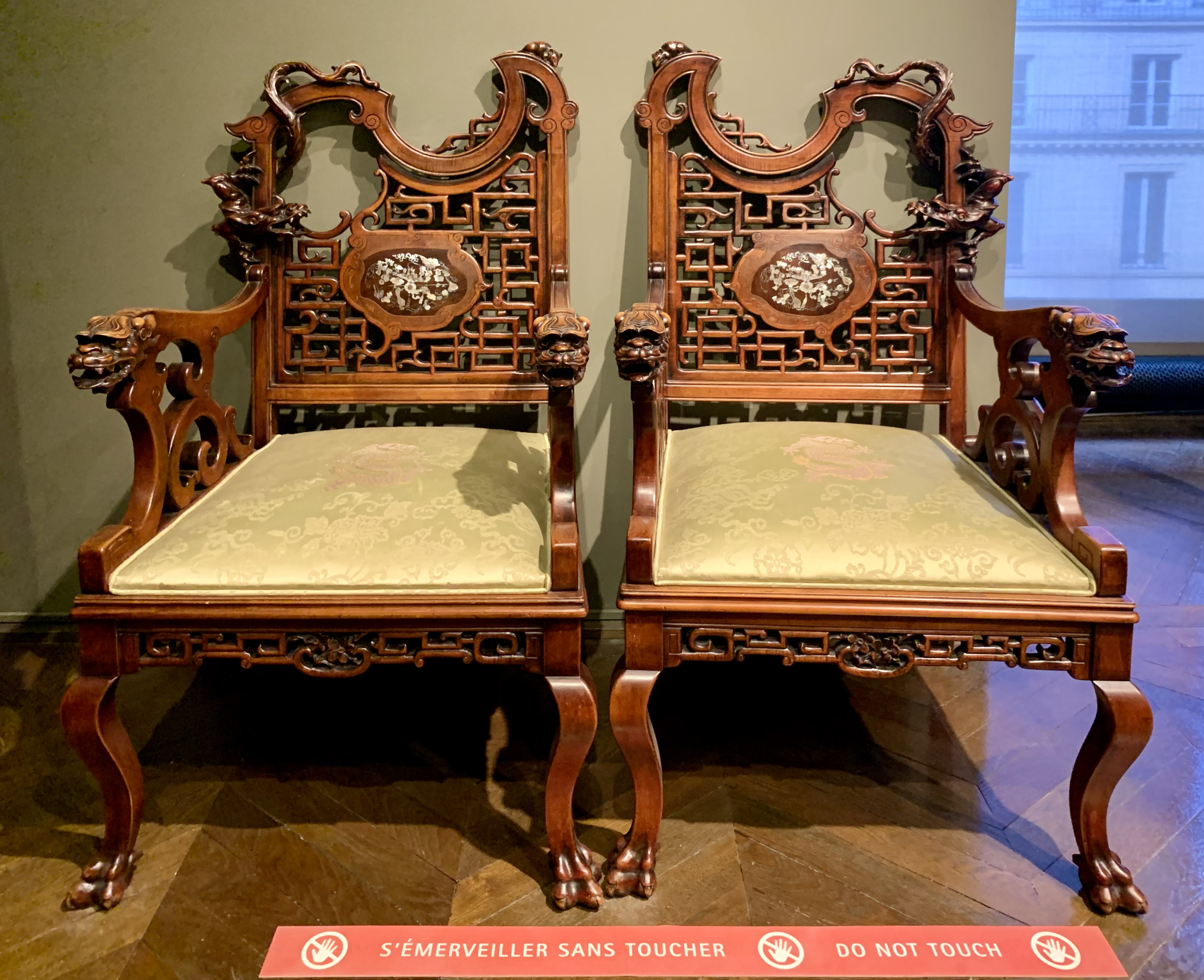
Gabriel Viardot, Paris, pair of armchairs, c. 1880

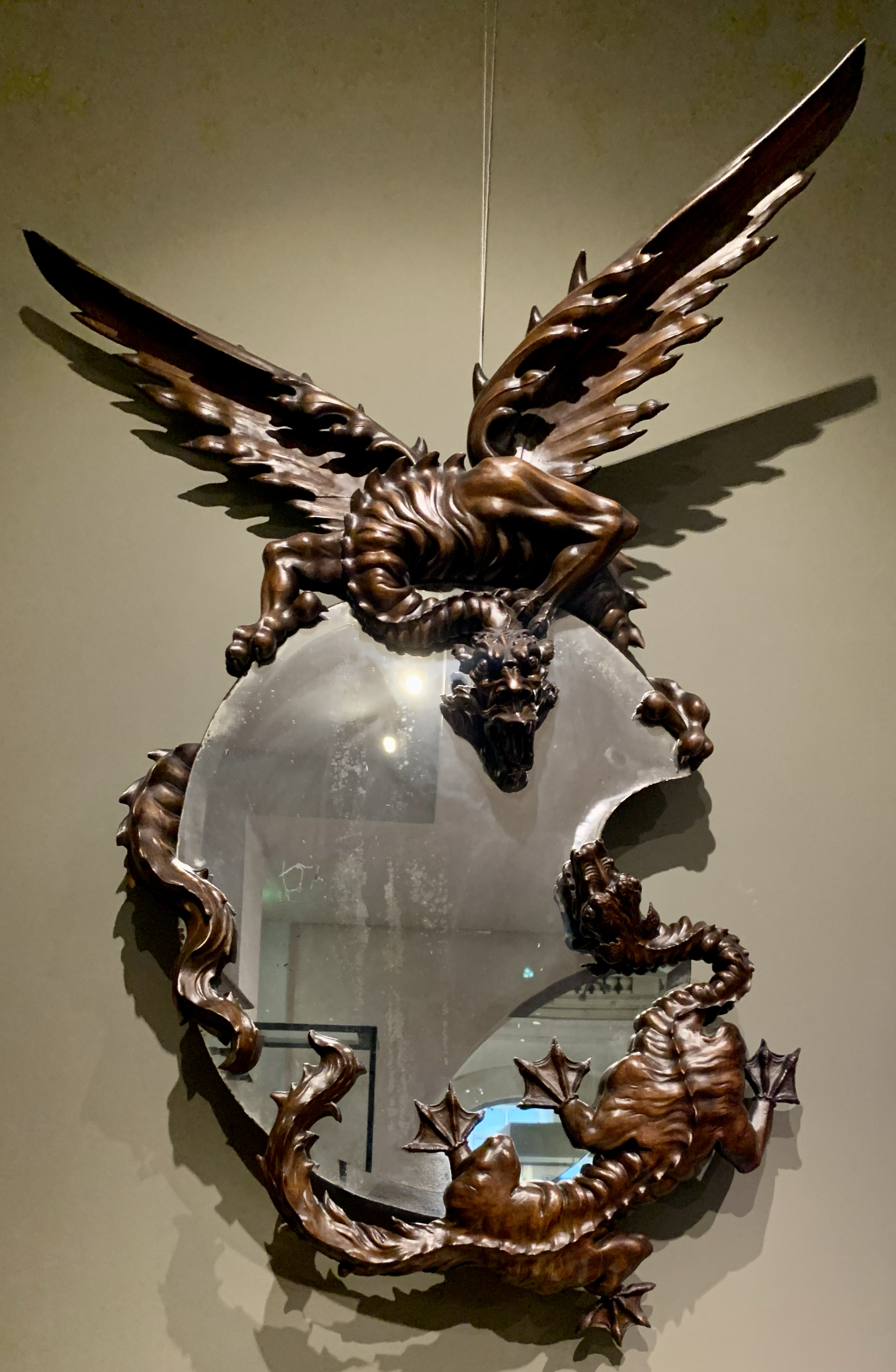
Gabriel Viardot, mirror with frame, c. 1880

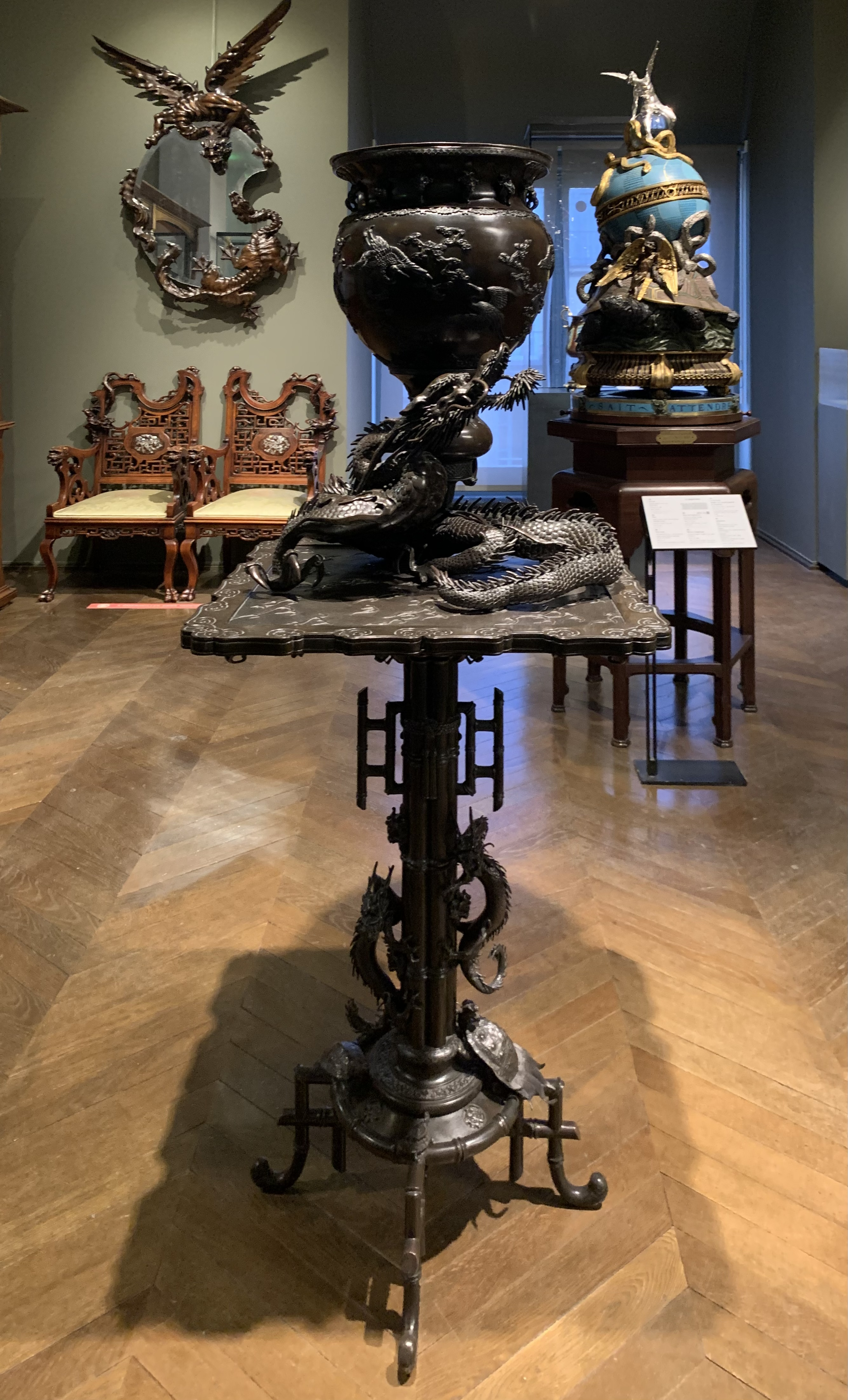
Édouard Lièvre and Maison Ferdinand Barbedienne, jardinière, c. 1880

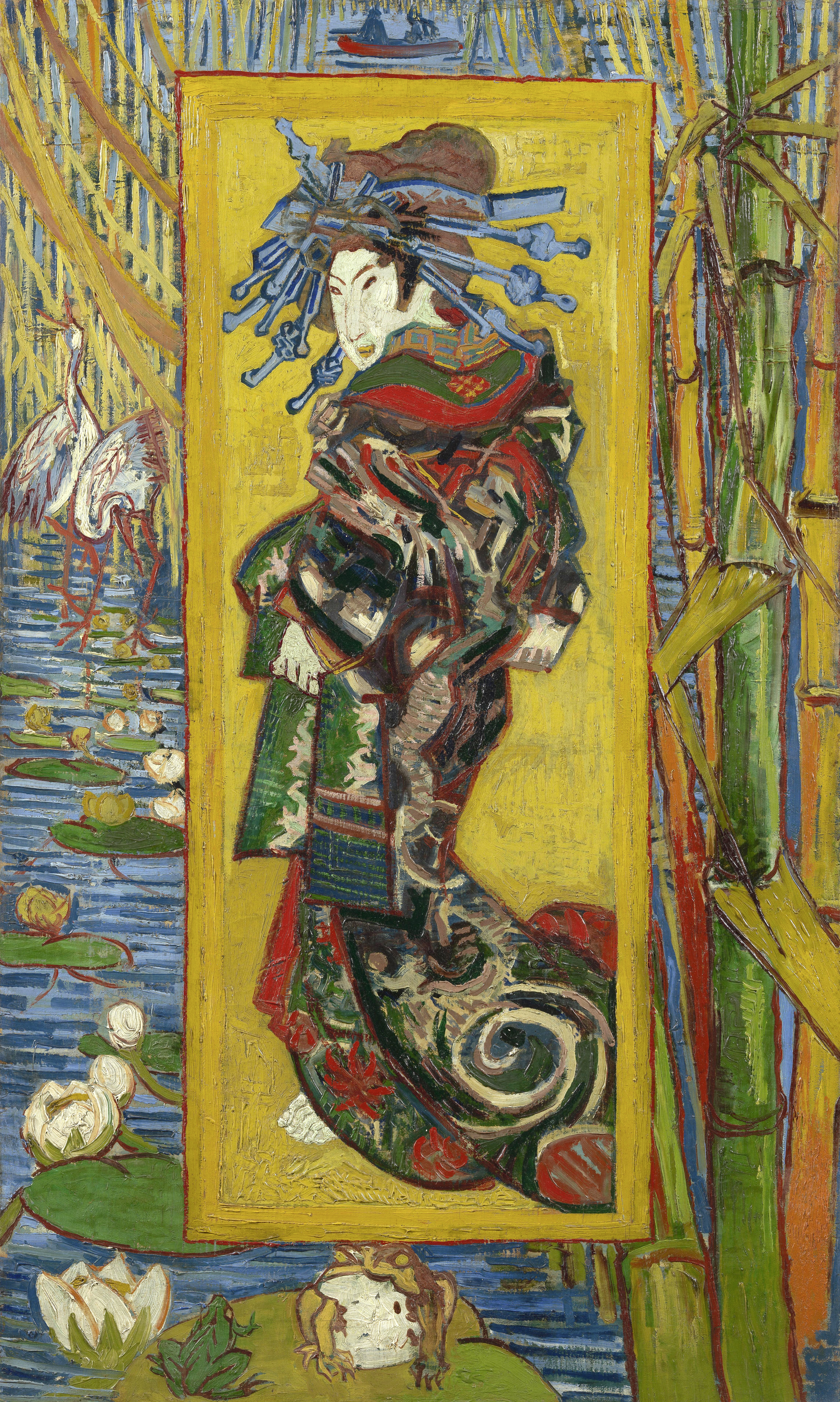
Vincent van Gogh, La courtisane (after Keisai Eisen), 1887

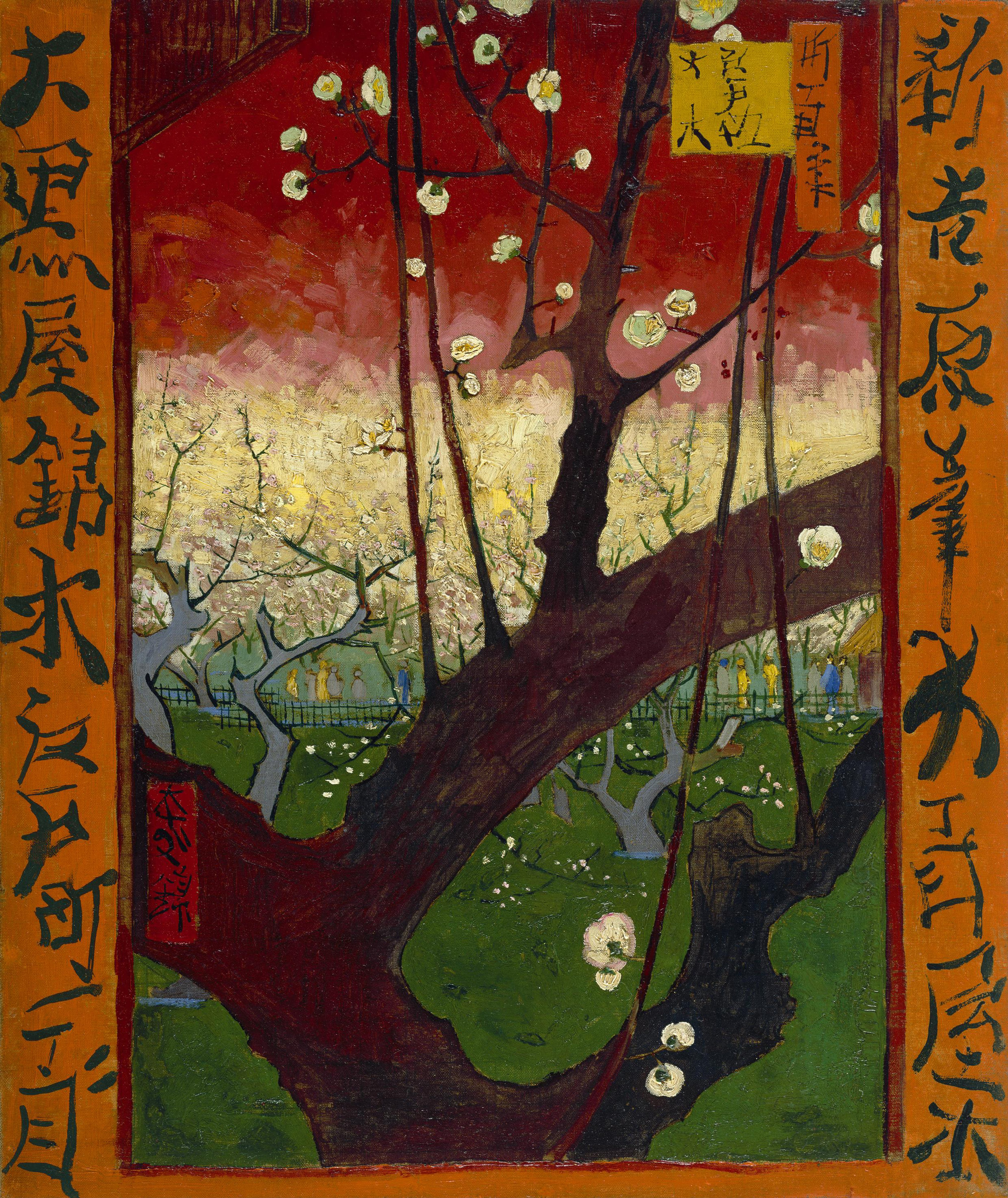
Vincent van Gogh, The Blooming Plum Tree (after Hiroshige's Plum Park in Kameido), 1887

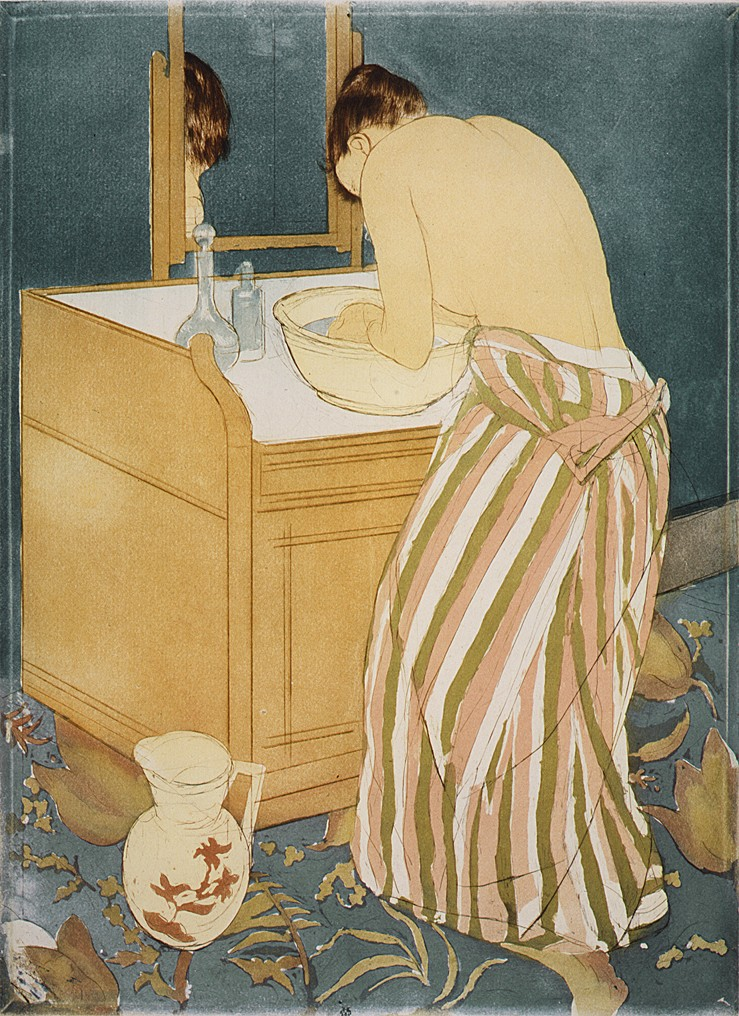
Mary Cassatt, Woman Bathing (La Toilette), 1890–91, Drypoint and aquatint print

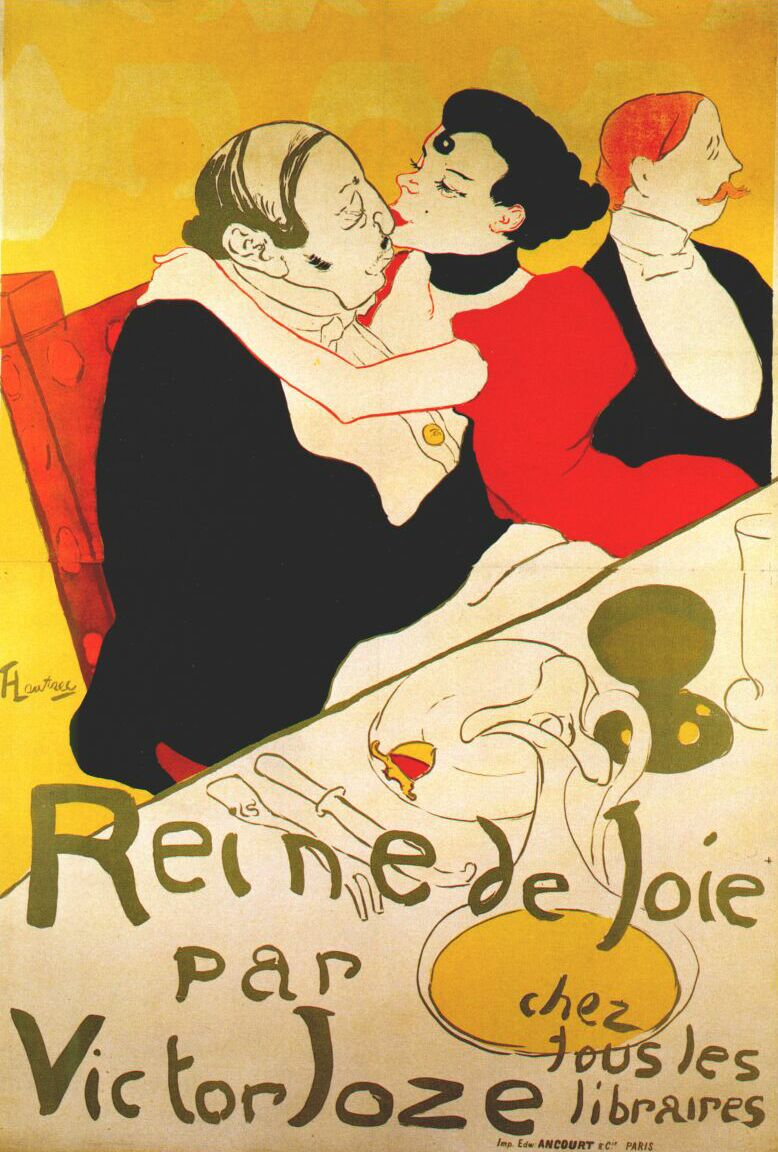
Henri de Toulouse-Lautrec lithograph poster of 1892

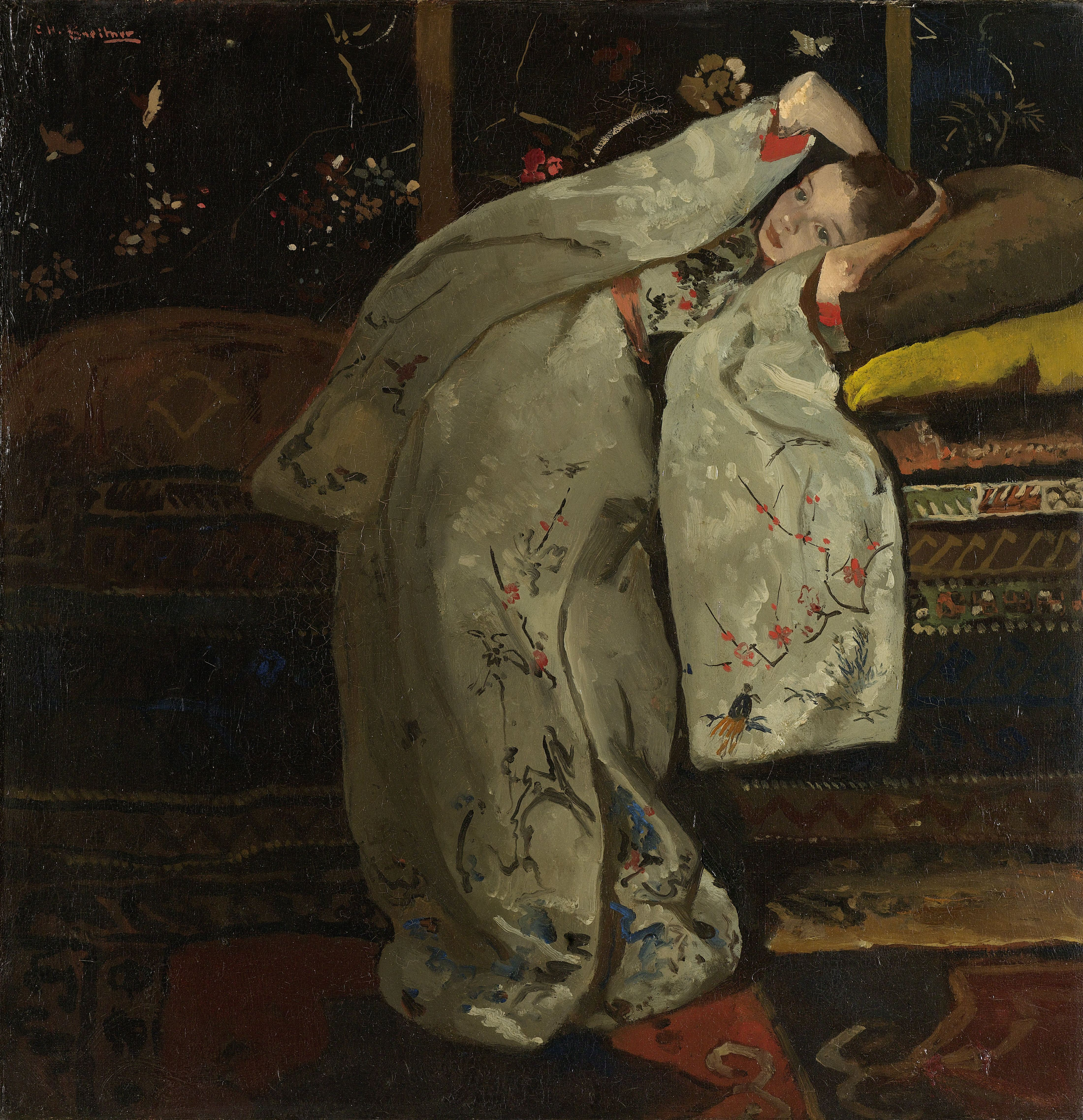
George Hendrik Breitner, Girl in a White Kimono, oil on canvas, 1894

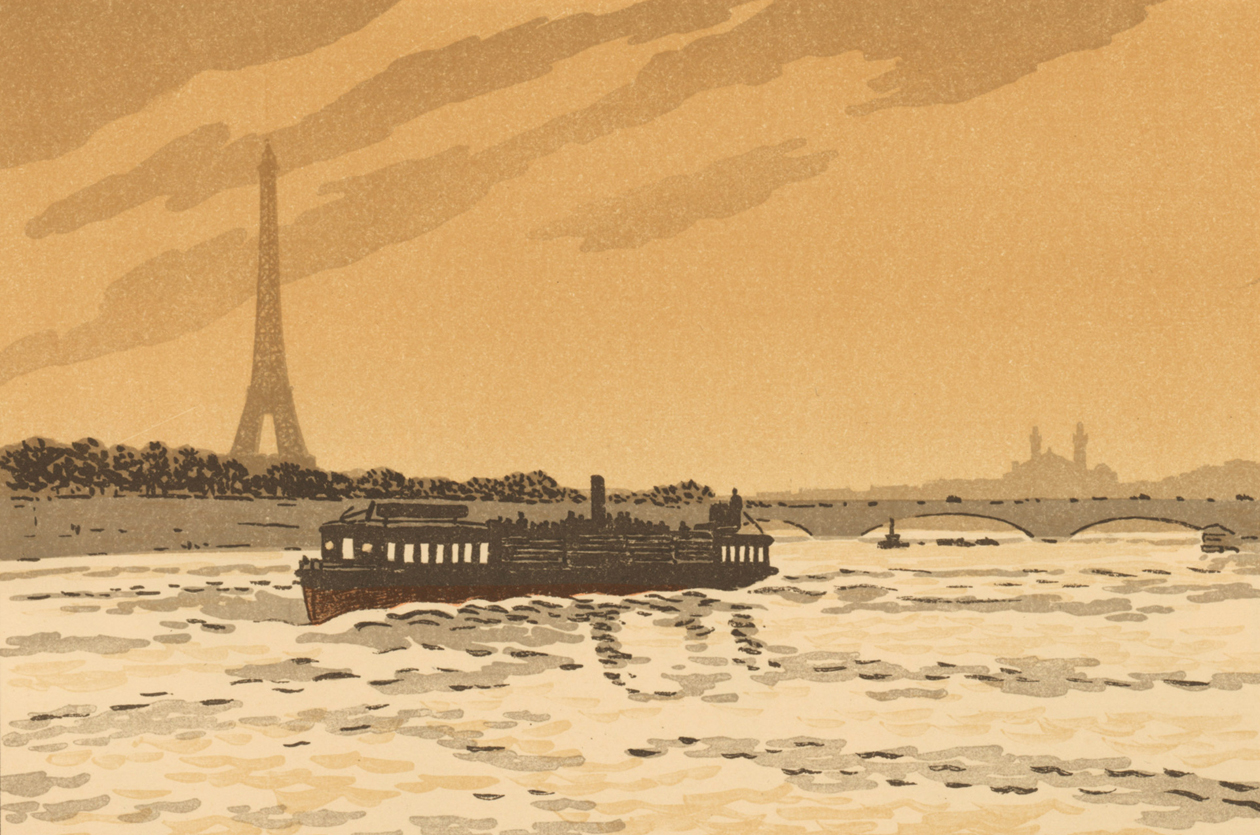
One of the 36 Views of the Eiffel Tower by Henri Rivière, 1902

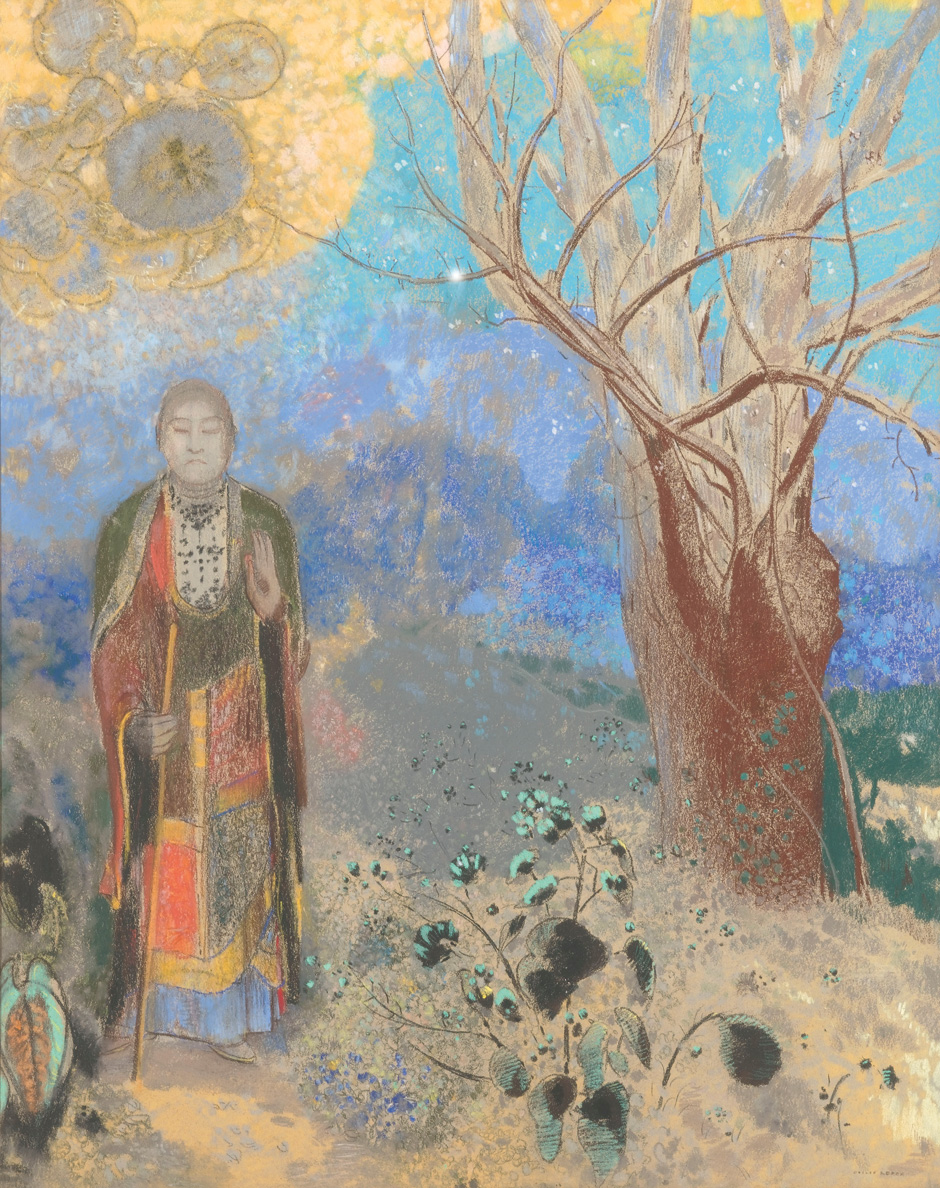
Odilon Redon, The Buddha, 1906

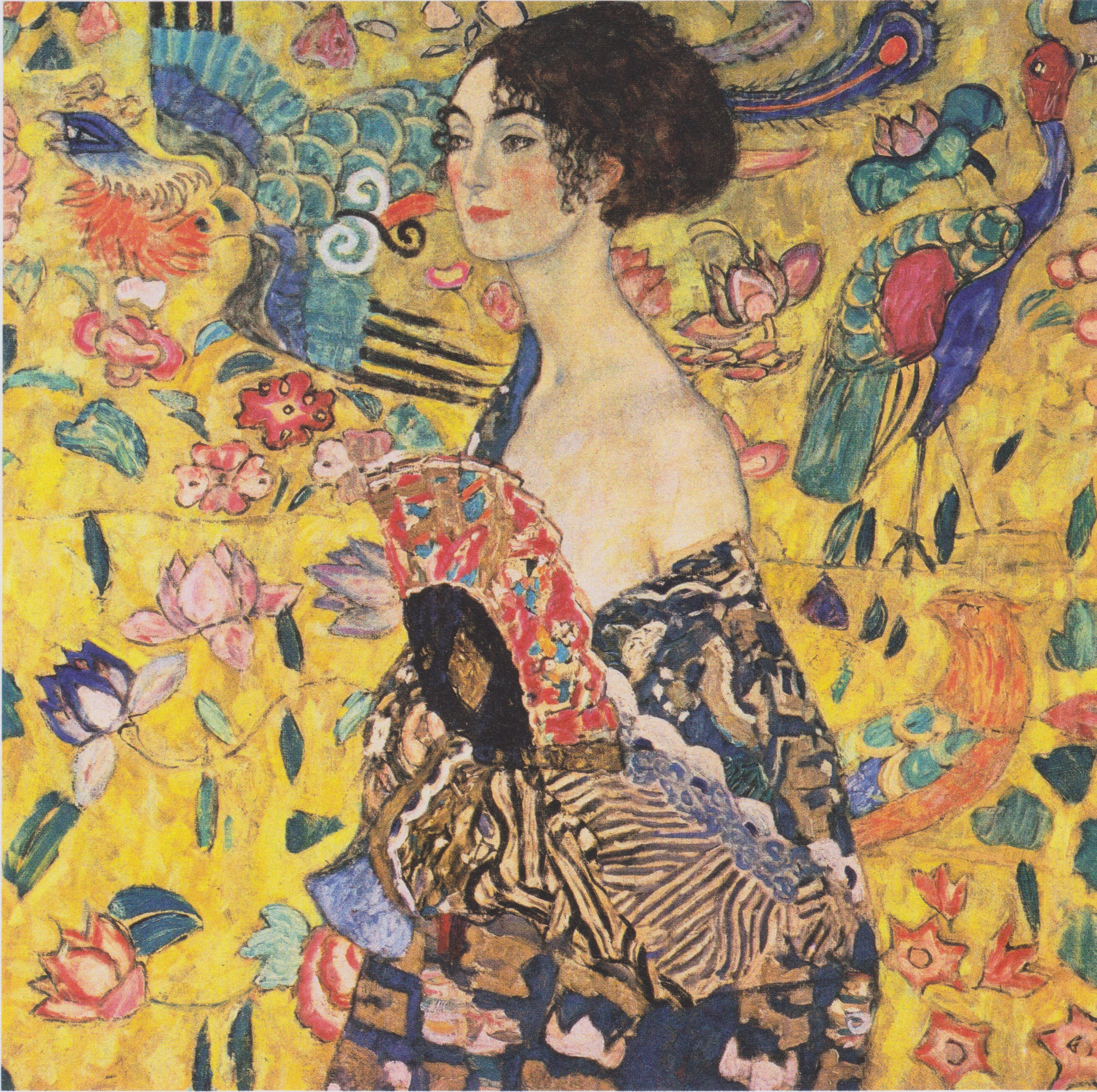
Gustav Klimt, Lady with fan, 1917/18

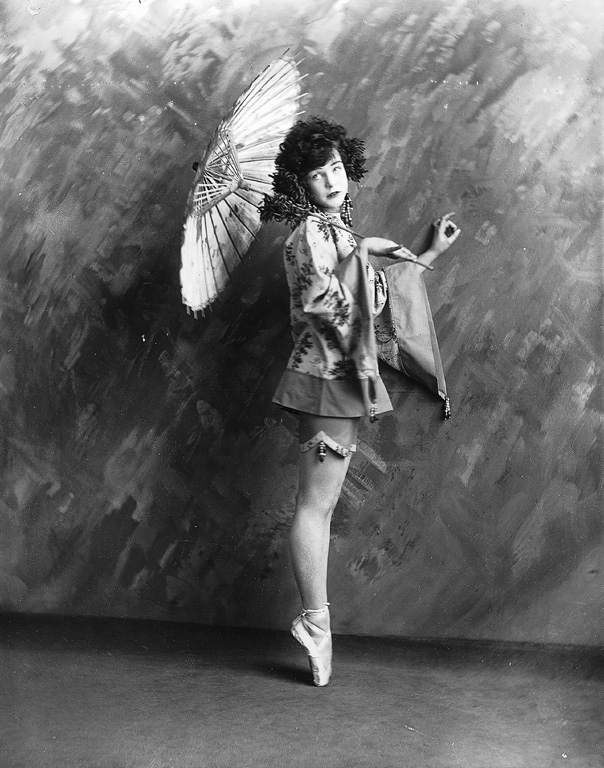
Miss Finney dancing, Montreal, Quebec, 1923

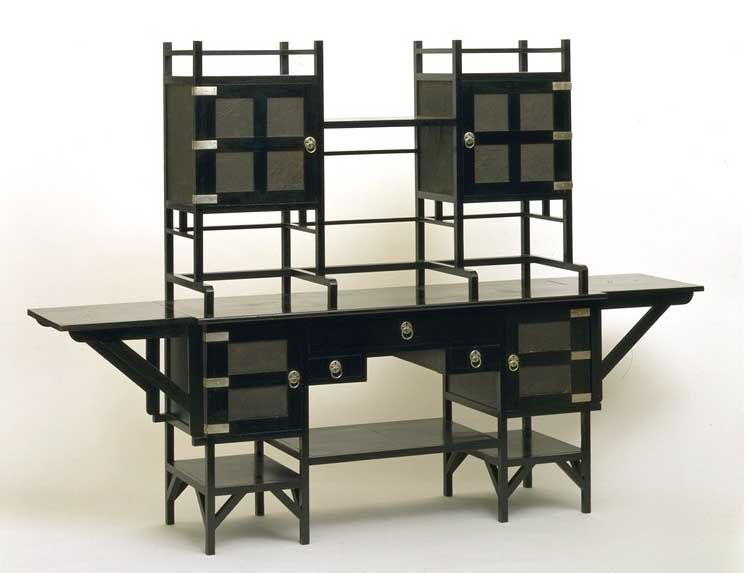
Sideboard by Edward William Godwin (c. 1867–70)

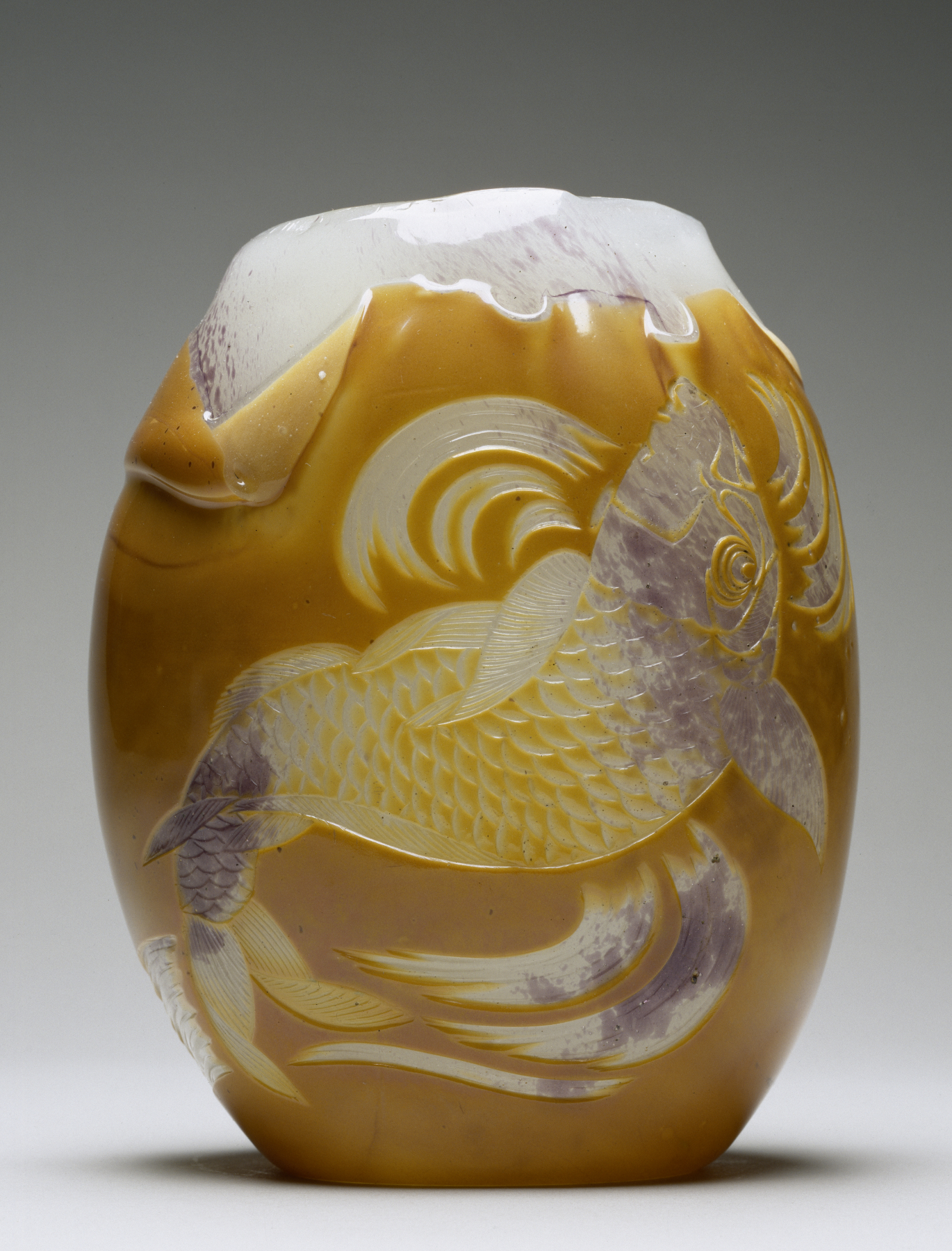
Carp vase; by Eugène Rousseau; 1878–1884

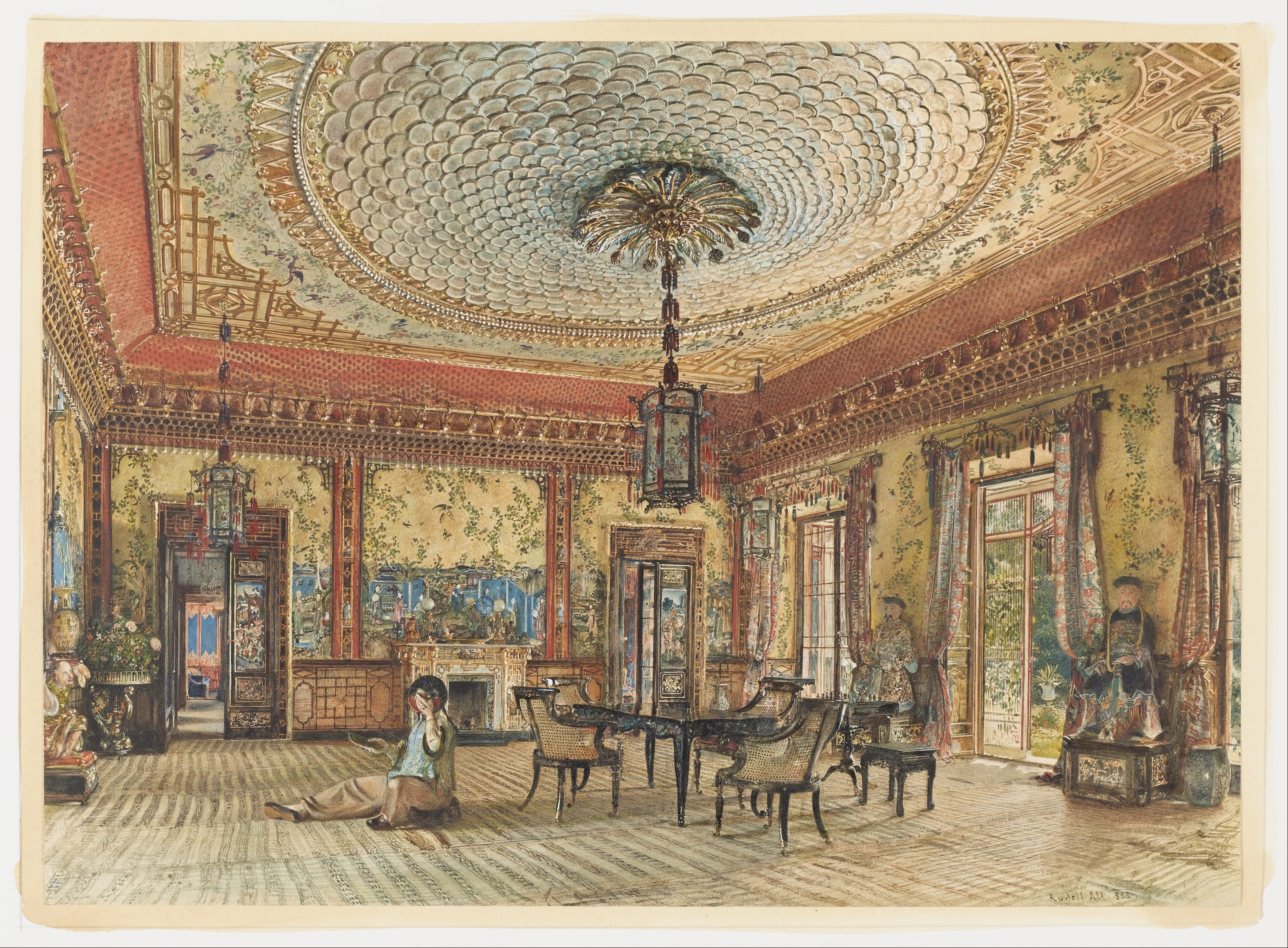
Japanese salon at Villa Hügel, Vienna

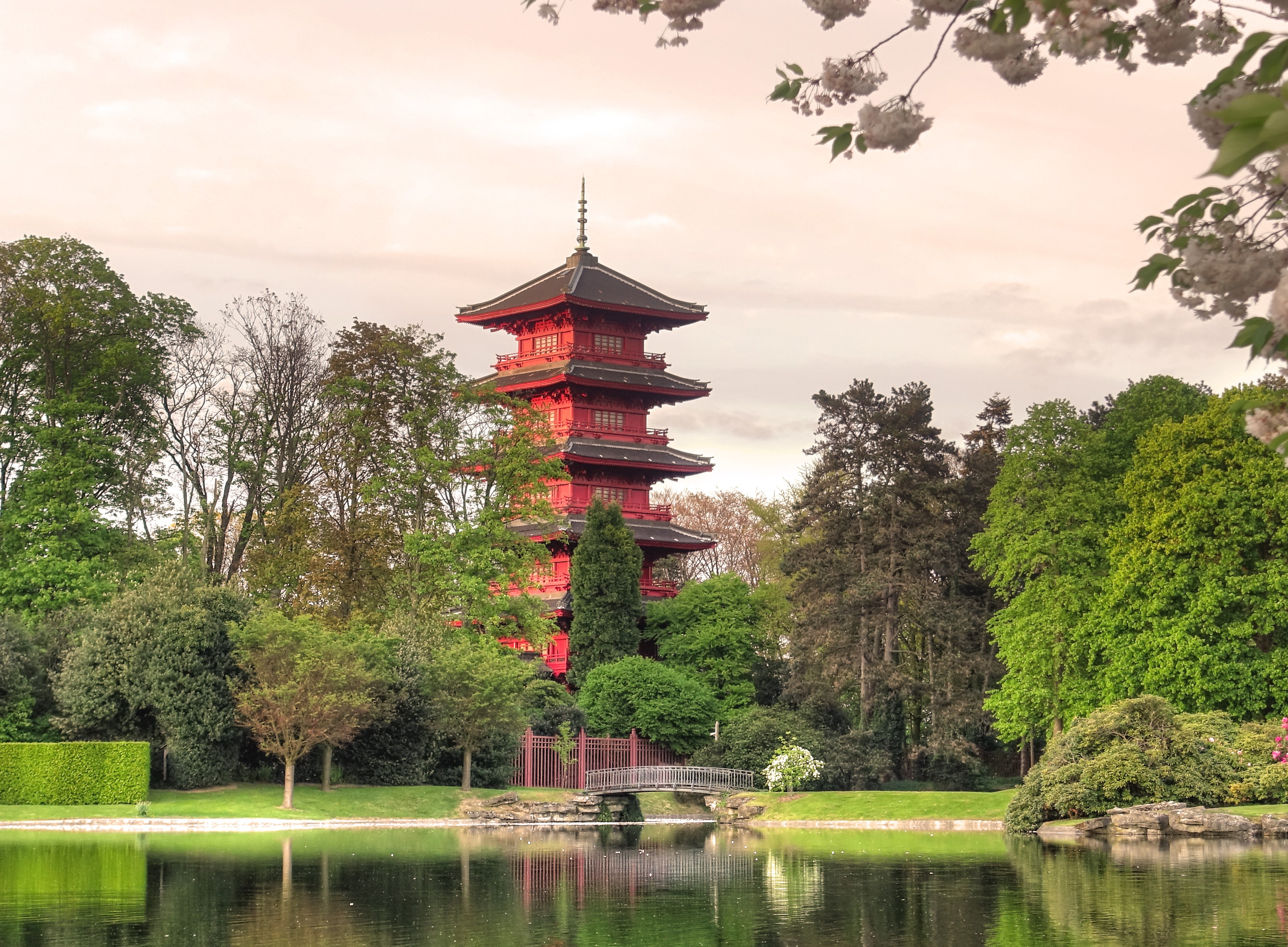
Japanese Tower and garden of the Museums of the Far East, Brussels

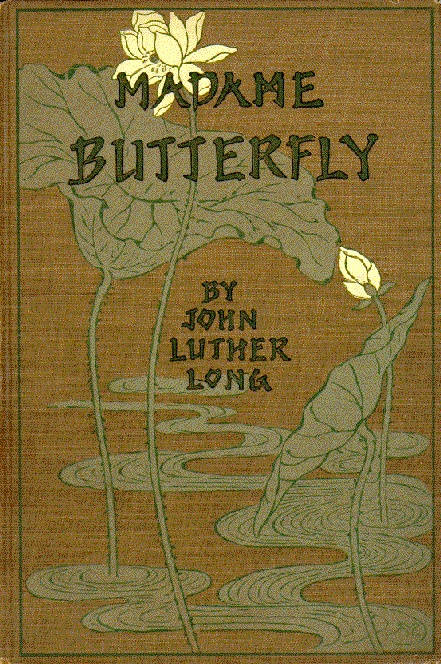
Cover of the Madame Butterfly (short story) 1903 edition

== See also ==
- Anglo-Japanese style
- Anime-influenced animation
- Arabist – "Arab" style
- Chinoiserie – similar Chinese influence on Western art and design
- David B. Gamble House
- Japanophilia
- Occidentalism – for Eastern views of the West
- Orientalism – Western romanticized depictions of Asian (more often Near Eastern) subject matter
- Turquerie
- Weeb
- Woodblock printing in Japan
- Woodcut
- Yamashiro Historic District
