= Georgette Meunier =

Belgian painter

- Born: October 7, 1859; Brussels, Belgium
- Died: 1951 (aged 91–92); Brussels, Belgium
- Known for: Painting

Georgette Meunier (October 7, 1859 – 1951) was a Belgian still life painter.

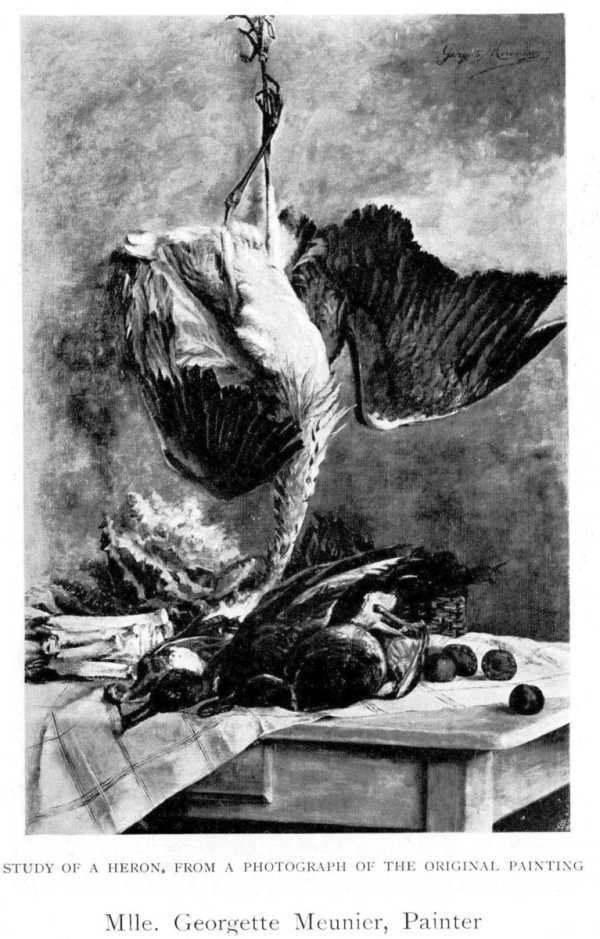
Study of a Heron

She was born in Brussels as the daughter of the engraver Jan-Baptiste Meunier, and the older sister of the painter Marc-Henry Meunier. Her father was the older brother of the painter-sculptor Constantin Meunier. She was trained by Alfred Stevens and became a member of the artist group L'Essor. Meunier exhibited two of her works at the Palace of Fine Arts at the 1893 World's Columbian Exposition in Chicago, Illinois.

Her painting Study of a Heron, was included in the 1905 book Women Painters of the World.

Meunier died in Brussels.
