= The Psyché (My Studio) =

Painting by Alfred Stevens

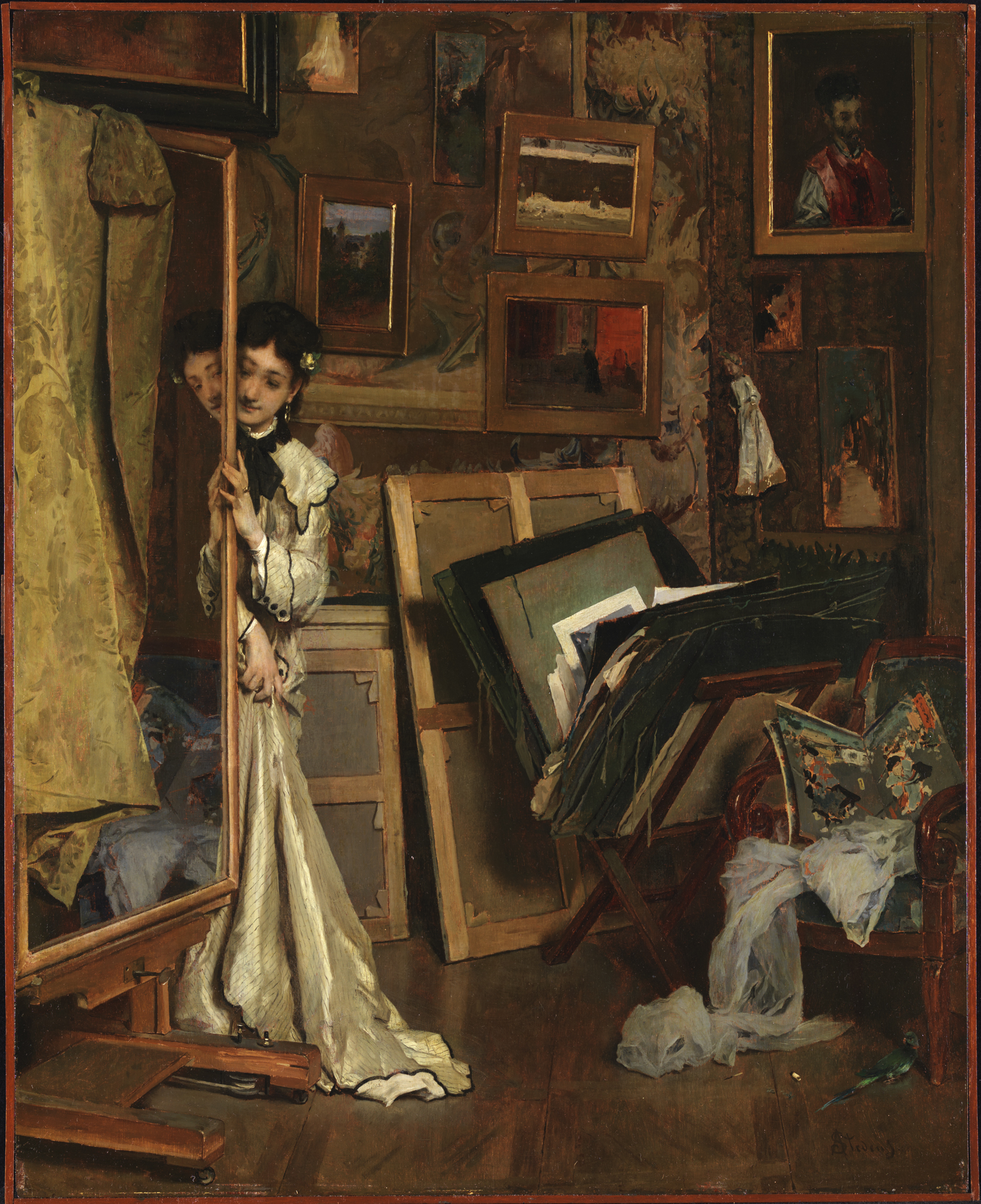
- Artist: Alfred Stevens
- Year: c. 1871
- Medium: Oil on panel
- Dimensions: 73.7 cm × 59.1 cm (29 in × 23.2 in)
- Location: Princeton University Art Museum; Princeton, New Jersey

The Psyché (My Studio) is an oil on panel painting by the Belgian artist Alfred Stevens. Painted in circa 1871, the painting once belonged to Robert de Montesquiou, and is currently housed at the Princeton University Art Museum located in Princeton, New Jersey.

The Psyché is noted for its realism, witticism, and allegory, three dimensions generally perceived sequentially herein. The French word psyché (meaning, as in English, both "the mind" and the ancient goddess beloved of Cupid) also designates a full-length mirror, invented in the late eighteenth century, that can be moved up and down or tilted on its chassis. Here, however, the psyché is placed on an easel, where a canvas is supposed to sit. The young woman, like Psyche to Cupid in the ancient tale, peers stealthily around the edge of the mirror to the viewer. In this painting, Psyche looks both into the mirror and, via the latter, at the viewer.

== Background and description ==
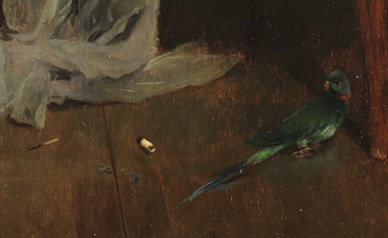
Detail of parrot, cigarette butt, ash, and extinguished match

Trained in Brussels, Stevens finished his studies in Paris and made his career there. During the Second Empire (1852–70), he pioneered and perfected the domestic interior scene, which the Impressionists then adopted. He was deeply influenced by Vermeer and Pieter de Hooch and often painted on wood panel.

This painting, which once belonged to the poet Robert de Montesquiou, is one of several by Stevens of his studio with a model and sometimes the artist. The painting's title alludes to multiple things, most notably the myth of Psyche and Cupid and the type of large mirror depicted on the left. A full-length mirror with chassis was invented in the late eighteenth century and took its name, psyché, from the aforementioned legend of Cupid and Psyche, a story that thematizes looking. Yet this is not an actual psyché but an easel with a mirror where the canvas would normally sit, an analogue to a psyché suggesting that art is a reflection of life.

A cloth partially covers the mirror, hiding the reflections of the studio. Focus instead is on the model, who may have interrupted her posing session to peer around the edge of the mirror, which reflects her head and hand. The artist hints at his own presence with the cigarette butt, ash, and match in the lower right corner. Nearby struts a small parrot, a reference to art's mimetic function. The backs of canvases and portfolios of prints or drawings represent some of Stevens's working materials. On a chair are Japanese prints, reminders of the artist's great passion: with his friends the Goncourt Brothers, Bracquemond, and Whistler, Stevens was one of the earliest collectors of Japanese art in Paris.

Among the small paintings on the wall is a sketch for his Salon picture What They Call Vagrancy (1854; Musée d’Orsay), a picture of social protest.

== Signature ==
In the years between 1850 and 1870, Stevens was pre-eminently regarded as a painter of the Parisian establishment . He made a name for himself as the upper class' ladies painter and painted in a highly realistic style, deeply influenced by the Dutch fine painters and Old Masters, particularly Johannes Vermeer. However, his works are distinguished by his emphasis on the casual, transitory moment, anticipating Impressionism. On the other hand, the emerging Impressionism began to influence Stevens around 1870, which manifested itself in a looser brushwork. La Psyché is one of the first works by Stevens in which these two aspects coincide.

== Theme and interpretation ==
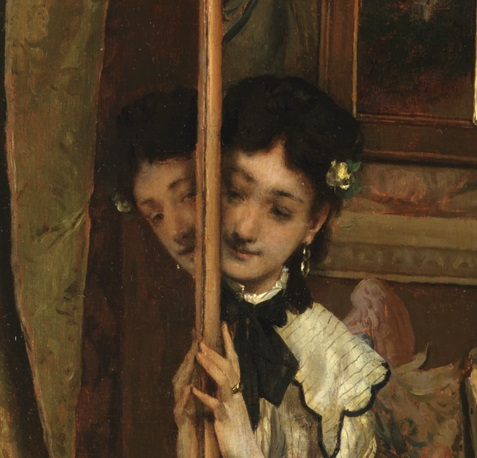
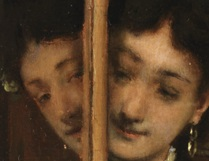
Detail, Psyche stares directly at the viewer through the mirror

La Psyché shows a young model in Stevens' Parisian studio during a break. She is half hidden behind a mirror, through which she looks at the viewer directly in the eye. Such a large mirror, wherein one can see oneself fully, is a piece of furniture typical of the second half of the nineteenth century and, as mentioned, it was also called psyché. The title of the painting, however, also refers through the furtive glance of the young woman to the myth of Psyche, who was forbidden to look at her beloved Amor, but secretly could not resist.

In the painting, in a witty transposition, Stevens’ model takes a break from posing and peeks around the psyché that stands in for the canvas on an easel. The artist's presence is implied by his cigarette butt, ash, and extinguished match on the floor (Stevens was a heavy smoker). There is a parrot, which signifies the act of imitation—just as the bird mimics human speech, so the artist imitates (or "mirrors") life. The Japanese prints in a portfolio reveal the artist's interest in Asian art. Stevens was an early collector, and he advocated Japonisme, which became increasingly available after a treaty opened Japan to international trade in 1854. Like Rembrant, Stevens was renowned for his ability in portraying exotic objects.

== Montesquiou ==
The Parisian dandy Robert de Montesquiou, who was the main inspiration for Baron de Charlus in Proust's À la recherche du temps perdu, was one of the early owners of La psyché. Of the work he wrote that it is "as if an apotheosis of Stevens' art and of his loves: the women, the objects and the reflections they multiply". As mentioned, on a chair there are the Japanese prints that the artist was so fond of. Montesquiou, however, was especially fascinated by the trinkets and other exotica that better suited him and his own lifestyle. He summarized the rubbish in the studio as d'une vérité bien hollandaise (of a truly Dutch reality). In a laudatory article, he pointed to the similarity between Vermeer and Stevens, especially the way in which both could paint to the finest detail not familiar, but rather exotic gems and objects: rubies, turquoise, and even the wonderfully colored wings of an exotic butterfly.

== Sources ==
- (2013) Princeton University Art Museum Handbook of the Collections Revised and Expanded Edition (2nd ed.), Princeton, NJ: Princeton University Art Museum, p. 212 ISBN 978-0943012414.
- The Psyché (My Studio) (2012-76). Princeton University Art Museum.
- Alfred Stevens. Brussels – Paris 1823-1906 . Brussels, Mercator Fund, 2009, pp. 145–146.
