= 13058 Alfredstevens =

Main-belt asteroid

Discovery
- Discovered by: E. W. Elst
- Discovery site: La Silla Obs.
- Discovery date: 19 November 1990

Designations
- Named after: Alfred Stevens (Belgian painter)
- Alternative designations: 1990 WN_{3} · 1992 GB_{7} 1992 HB_{6}
- Minor planet category: main-belt · Vesta

Orbital characteristics
- Epoch 4 September 2017 (JD 2458000.5)
- Uncertainty parameter 0
- Observation arc: 26.45 yr (9,662 days)
- Aphelion: 2.6314 AU
- Perihelion: 2.0871 AU
- Semi-major axis: 2.3593 AU
- Eccentricity: 0.1154
- Orbital period (sidereal): 3.62 yr (1,324 days)
- Mean anomaly: 154.40°
- Mean motion: 0° 16^{m} 19.2^{s} / day
- Inclination: 6.1063°
- Longitude of ascending node: 197.09°
- Argument of perihelion: 214.67°

Physical characteristics
- Dimensions: 2.601±0.409 km 3.06 km (calculated)
- Synodic rotation period: 4.2993±0.0057 h
- Geometric albedo: 0.20 (assumed); 0.344±0.082
- Spectral type: S
- Absolute magnitude (H): 14.5 · 15.23±0.26 · 14.7 · 14.483±0.004 (R) · 14.93

13058 Alfredstevens, provisional designation 1990 WN_{3}, is a stony Vestian asteroid from the inner regions of the asteroid belt, approximately 3 kilometers in diameter. It was discovered by Belgian astronomer Eric Elst at ESO's La Silla Observatory in Northern Chile, on 19 November 1990. The asteroid was named for Belgian painter Alfred Stevens.

== Orbit and classification ==
Based on its orbital elements, Alfredstevens is a member of the Vesta family, a group of asteroids that originated from a massive impact on the Southern Hemnisphere of 4 Vesta, the family's namesake. It orbits the Sun in the inner main-belt at a distance of 2.1–2.6 AU once every 3 years and 7 months (1,324 days). Its orbit has an eccentricity of 0.12 and an inclination of 6° with respect to the ecliptic.

The body's observation arc begins just five days prior to its official discovery observation, with a precovery taken at Palomar Observatory on 14 November 1990.

== Physical characteristics ==
=== Lightcurves ===
In January 2013, a rotational lightcurve of Alfredstevens was obtained from photometric observations in the R-band by astronomers at the Palomar Transient Factory in California. Lightcurve analysis gave a rotation period of 4.2993 hours with a brightness variation of 0.45 magnitude (U=2).

=== Diameter and albedo ===
According to the survey carried out by the NEOWISE mission of NASA's space-based Wide-field Infrared Survey Explorer, Alfredstevens measures 2.6 kilometers in diameter and its surface has a high albedo of 0.34, while the Collaborative Asteroid Lightcurve Link assumes a standard albedo for stony asteroids of 0.20 and calculates a larger diameter of 3.1 kilometers with an absolute magnitude of 14.93.

== Naming ==
This minor planet was named in honor of Belgian painter Alfred Stevens (1823–1906), known for his paintings of elegant modern women. The official naming citation was published by the Minor Planet Center on 30 January 2010 (M.P.C. 68446).
