= La parisienne japonaise =

Painting by Alfred Stevens

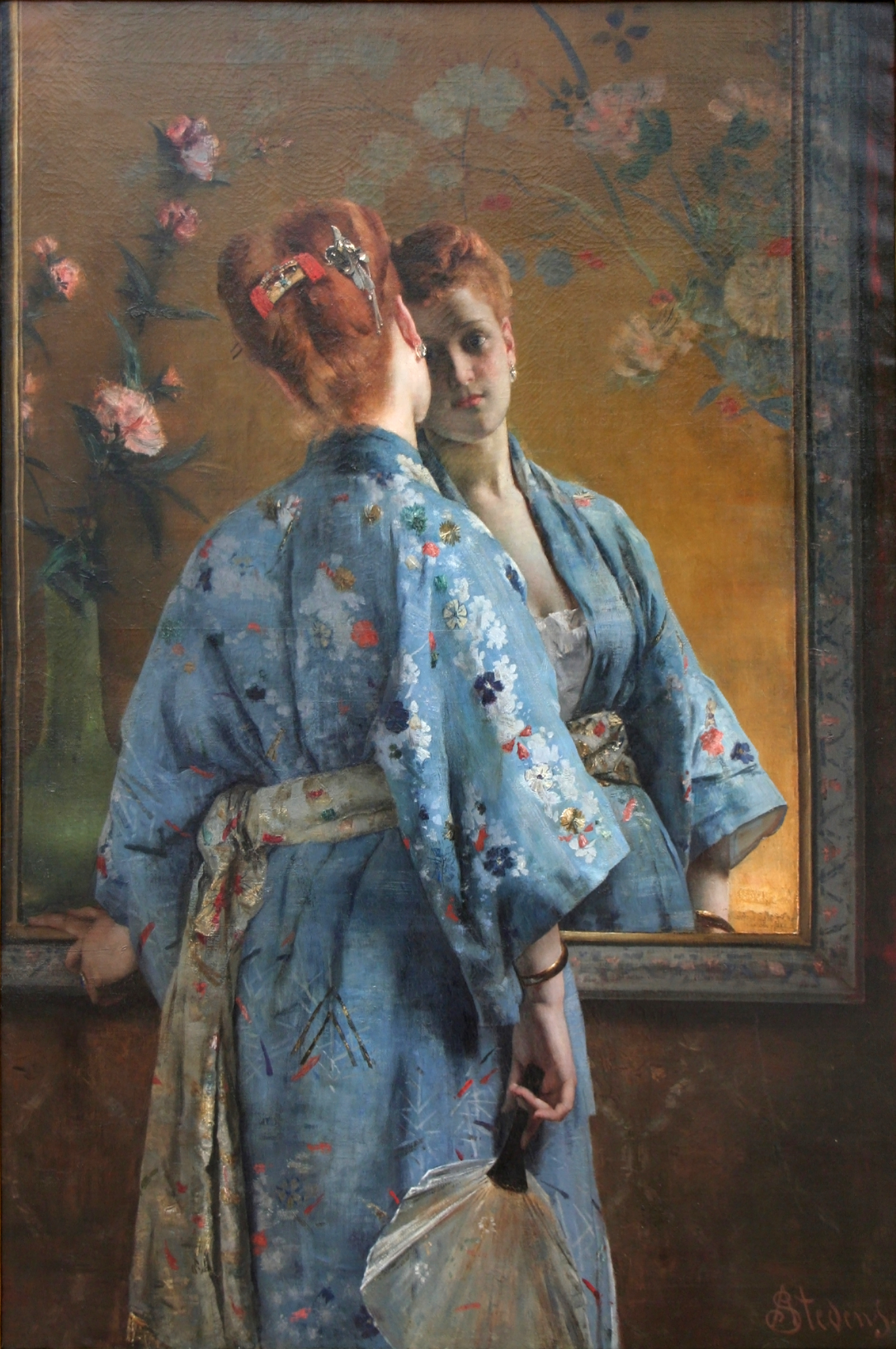
- Artist: Alfred Stevens
- Year: 1872
- Medium: Oil on canvas
- Dimensions: 111.8 cm × 77.3 cm (44 in × 30.4 in)
- Location: La Boverie; Liège

La parisienne japonaise is an oil on canvas painting by Belgian painter Alfred Stevens. It depicts a young woman in a blue kimono standing in front of a mirror. The painting testifies to Stevens' involvement with Japonisme. Stevens was one of the earliest collectors of Japanese art in Paris.

== Context ==
During the Kaei era (1848–1854), after more than 200 years of seclusion, foreign merchant ships of various nationalities began to visit Japan. Following the Meiji Restoration in 1868, Japan ended a long period of national isolation and became open to imports from the West, including photography and printing techniques. With this new opening in trade, Japanese art and artifacts began to appear in small curiosity shops in Paris and London. Japonisme began as a craze for collecting Japanese art, particularly ukiyo-e. Some of the first samples of ukiyo-e were to be seen in Paris.

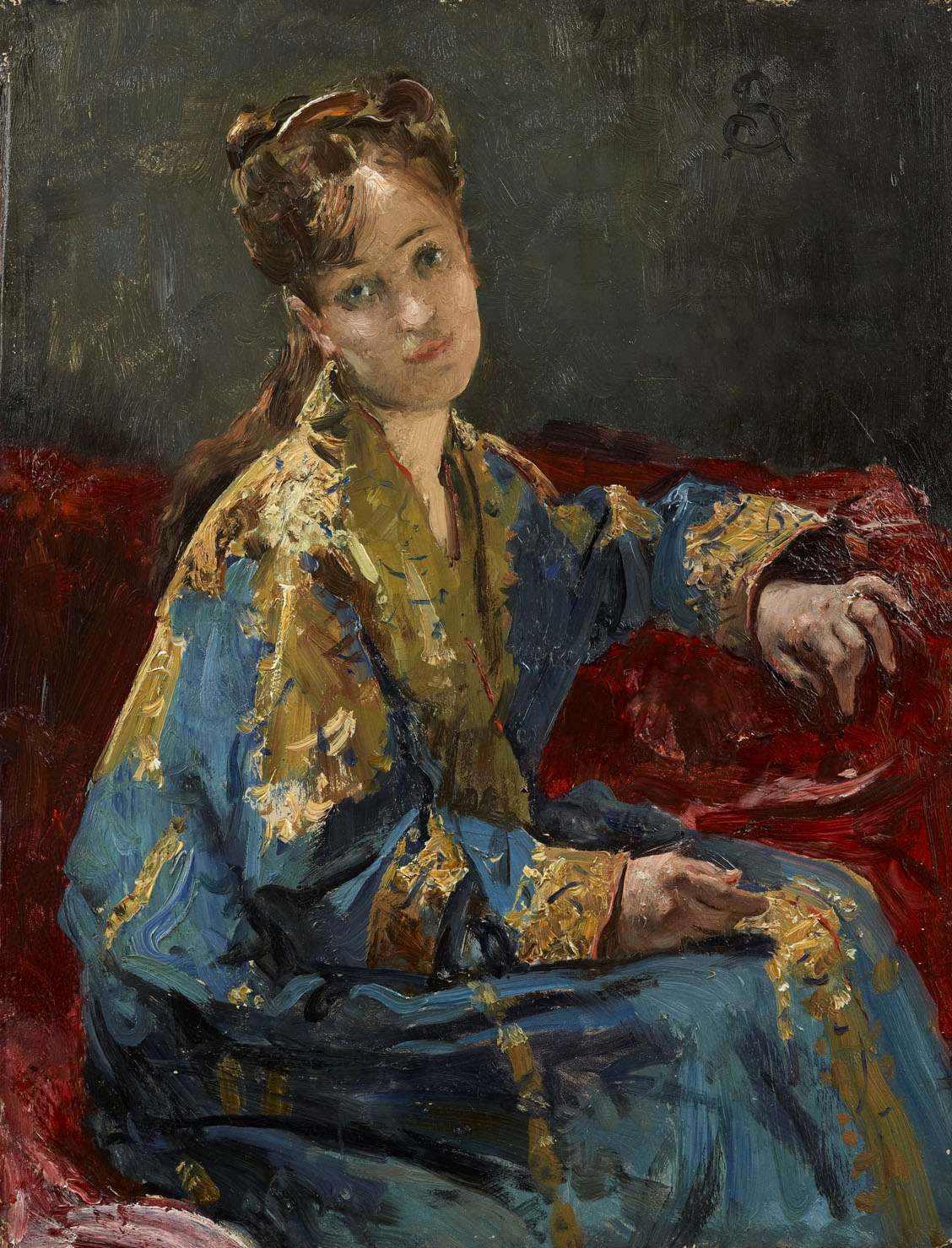
Girl in Kimono, same period

The Ukiyo-e became a great influence on painting and the decorative arts. At that time, Japonisme influenced Steven' work, just as James McNeill Whistler's, to whom Stevens was close (Whistler was especially close to Tissot in the 1870s and to Stevens in the 1880s). Starting from the 1860s, paintings by Whistelr's friends Stevens and James Tissot depict European women whose enthralled gazes directed at East Asian objects seem to "invest those objects with uncanny vitality."

Both Stevens and Whistler best expressed this exotic influence in a series of female portraits. La parisienne japonaise is a typical example therof. Almost all objects on display are Japanese and probably come from Stevens's personal collection.

== Painting ==
La parisienne japonaise shows a sophisticated woman in an elegantly decorated blue kimono, with a fan in her right hand, standing in front of a mirror in which she looks at herself somewhat absentmindedly.

The mirrored image also gives the viewer an impression of the space in which she is located. A vase of flowers is thus visible via the mirror on the left. The background is relatively empty, and a folding screen behind the young woman prevents further inquiring into her whereabouts, so that the attention automatically returns to the model and her colorful, exotic dress.

== Sources ==
- Saskia de Bodt and others: Alfred Stevens. Brussels – Paris 1823-1906 . Royal Museums of Fine Arts of Belgium, Van Gogh Museum / Mercator Fund, 2009. ISBN 9789061538745
