= Alfred Stevens (painter) =

19th-century Belgian painter

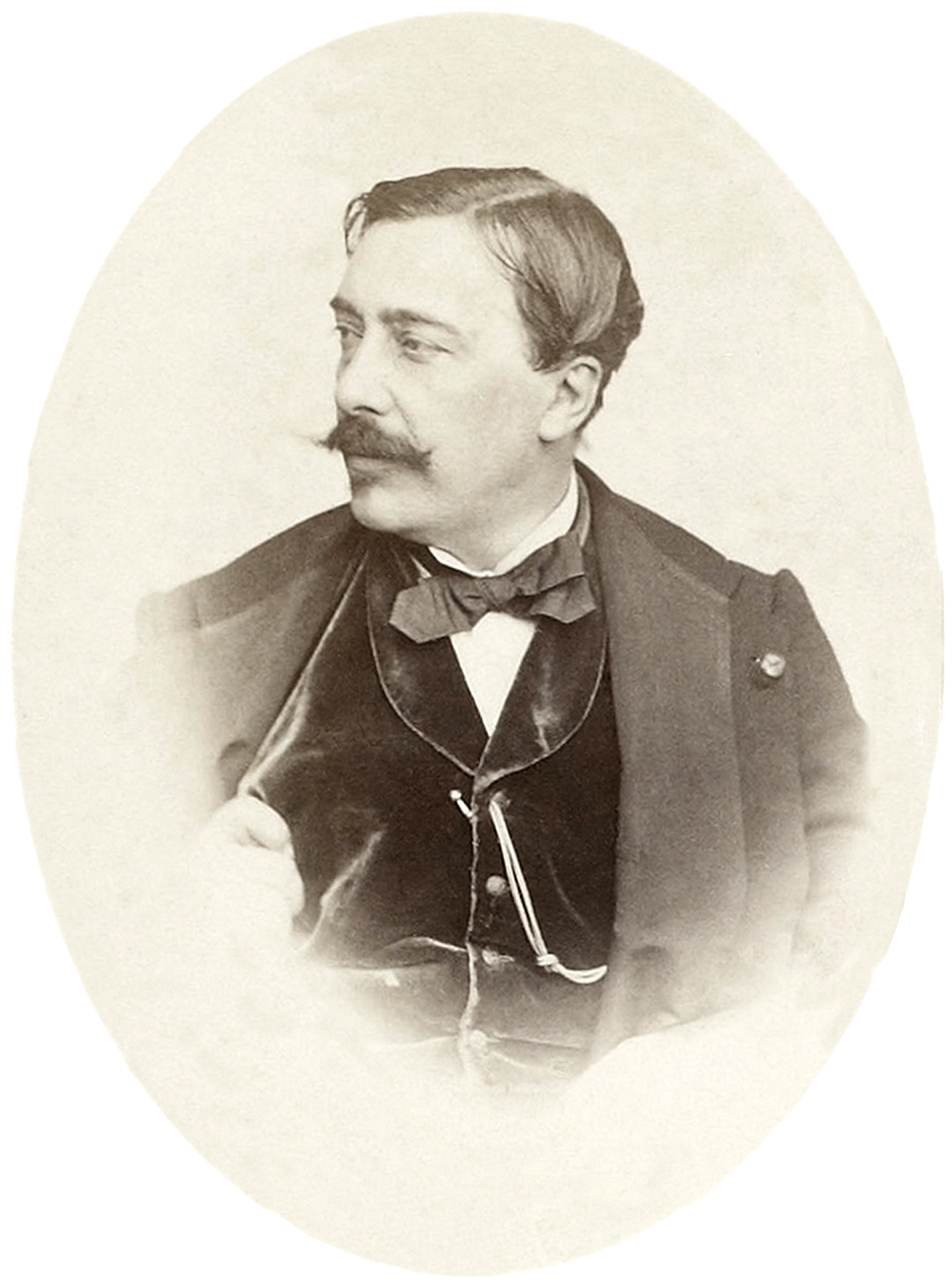
- Born: Alfred Émile Léopold Stevens; 11 May 1823; Brussels, United Kingdom of the Netherlands
- Died: 24 August 1906 (aged 83); Paris, France
- Known for: Painting
- Notable work: What is Called Vagrancy, The Psyché, The Parisian Sphinx
- Movement: Social realism, Realism, Orientalism, Dutch realism style

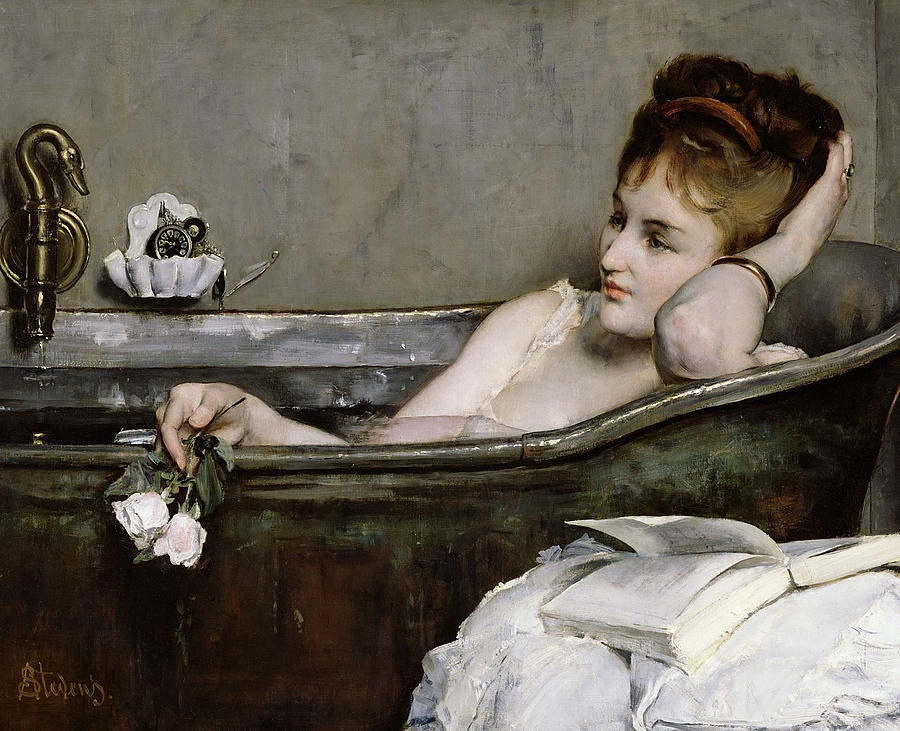
Le Bain, 1873–74

Alfred Émile Léopold Stevens (11 May 1823 – 24 August 1906) was a Belgian painter, known for his paintings of elegant modern women. In their realistic style and careful finish, his works reveal the influence of 17th-century Dutch genre painting. After gaining attention early in his career with a social realist painting depicting the plight of poor vagrants, he achieved great critical and popular success with his scenes of upper-middle class Parisian life.

== Family background ==
Stevens was born in Brussels. He came from a family involved with the visual arts: his older brother Joseph (1816–1892) and his son Léopold (1866–1935) were painters, while another brother Arthur (1825–1899) was an art dealer and critic. His father, who had fought in the Napoleonic wars in the army of William I of the Netherlands, was an art collector who owned several watercolors by Eugène Delacroix, among other artists. His mother's parents ran Café de l'Amitié in Brussels, a meeting place for politicians, writers, and artists. All the Stevens children benefited from the people they met there, and the social skills they acquired in growing up around important people.

== Education ==
After the death of his father in 1837, Stevens left middle school to begin study at the Académie Royale des Beaux-Arts in Brussels, where he knew François Navez, the Neo-Classical painter and former student of Jacques-Louis David who was its director and an old friend of Stevens's grandfather. Following a traditional curriculum, he drew from casts of classical sculpture for the first two years, and then drew from live models. In 1843, Stevens went to Paris, joining his brother Joseph who already was there. He was admitted to the École des Beaux-Arts, the most important art school in Paris. Although it is said that he became a student of its director Jean Auguste Dominique Ingres, this is likely not true. An early picture by Stevens, The Pardon or Absolution (Hermitage, St. Petersburg), signed and dated 1849, shows his mastery of a conventional naturalistic style which owes much to 17th-century Dutch genre painting. Like the Belgian painter and friend with whom he stayed in Paris, Florent Willems (1823–1905), Stevens carefully studied works by painters such as Gerard ter Borch and Gabriel Metsu.

== Career beginnings ==
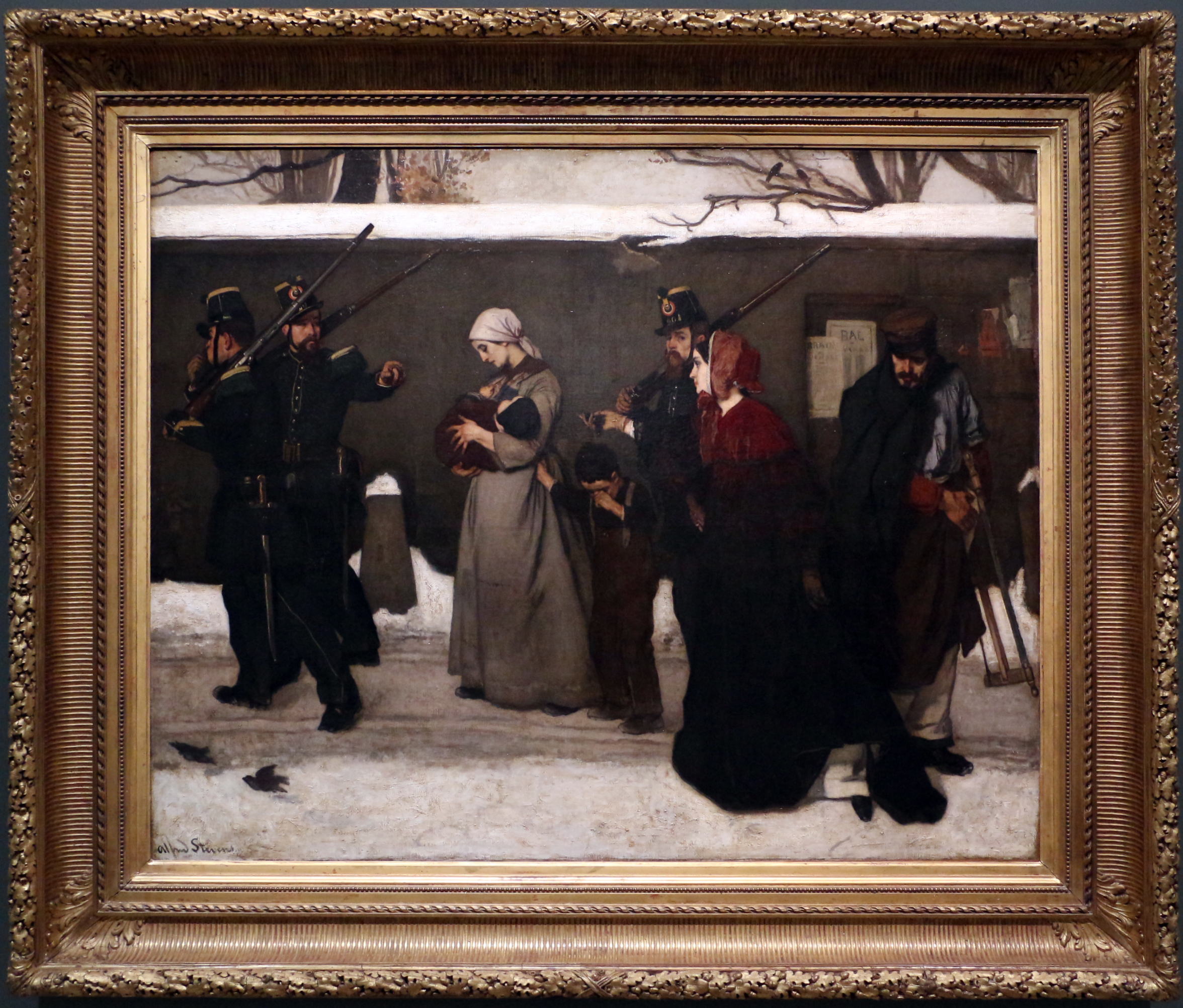
What is Called Vagrancy, 1854

Stevens's work was shown publicly for the first time in 1851, when three of his paintings were admitted to the Brussels Salon. He was awarded a third-class medal at the Paris Salon of 1853, and a second-class medal at the Salon of 1855 during the Universal Exposition in Paris in 1855. His Ce qu'on appelle le vagabondage [What is called vagrancy] (Musée d'Orsay, Paris) attracted the attention of Napoleon III who, as a result of the scene in the picture, ordered that soldiers no longer be used to pick up the poor from the streets. Two other paintings he exhibited at the Antwerp Salon that year, Chez soi or At Home (present location unknown) and The Painter and his Model (Walters Art Museum, Baltimore), introduced subjects from "la vie moderne" for which he became known: an elegant young woman in contemporary dress and the artist in his studio. In 1857, Stevens made his first important sale to a private collector, when Consolation was bought for a rumored 6,000 francs by the Berlin collector and dealer Ravéné. At the same time, he and his brother were becoming part of the art world of Paris, meeting people such as the Goncourt brothers, Théophile Gautier, and Alexandre Dumas at the salons of Princess Mathilde as well as popular cafés.

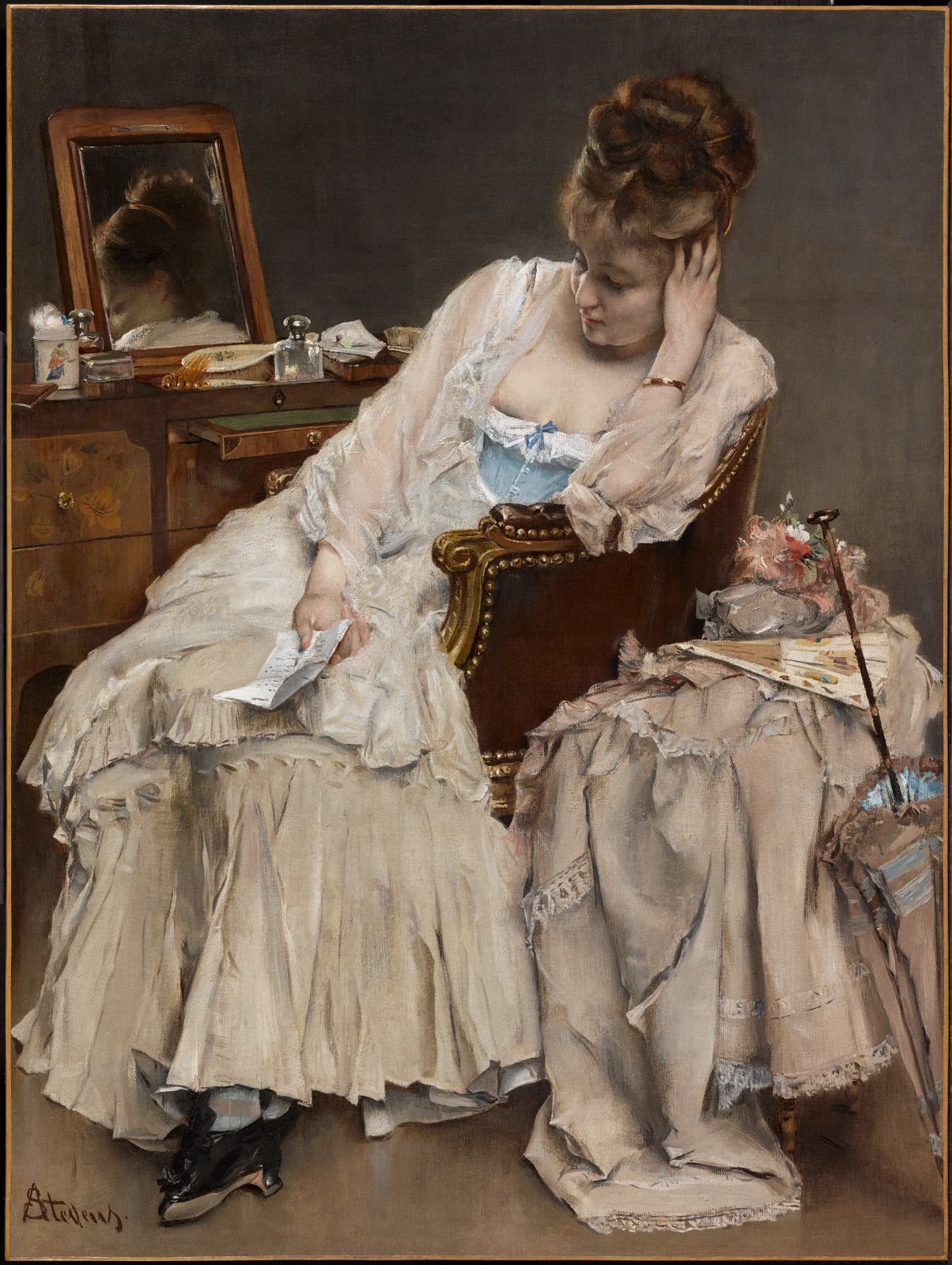
Memories and Regrets, ca. 1874, Clark Art Institute, Williamstown

In 1858, Stevens married Fanny Juliette Albertine Marie Hortense Blanc (1836–1891), who came from a rich Belgian family. Eugène Delacroix was a witness at the ceremony. The couple would have four children together—Leopold, Jean, Catherine, and Pierre. Stevens painted his wife's portrait many times, including Memories and Regrets (ca. 1874).

== Mature career ==
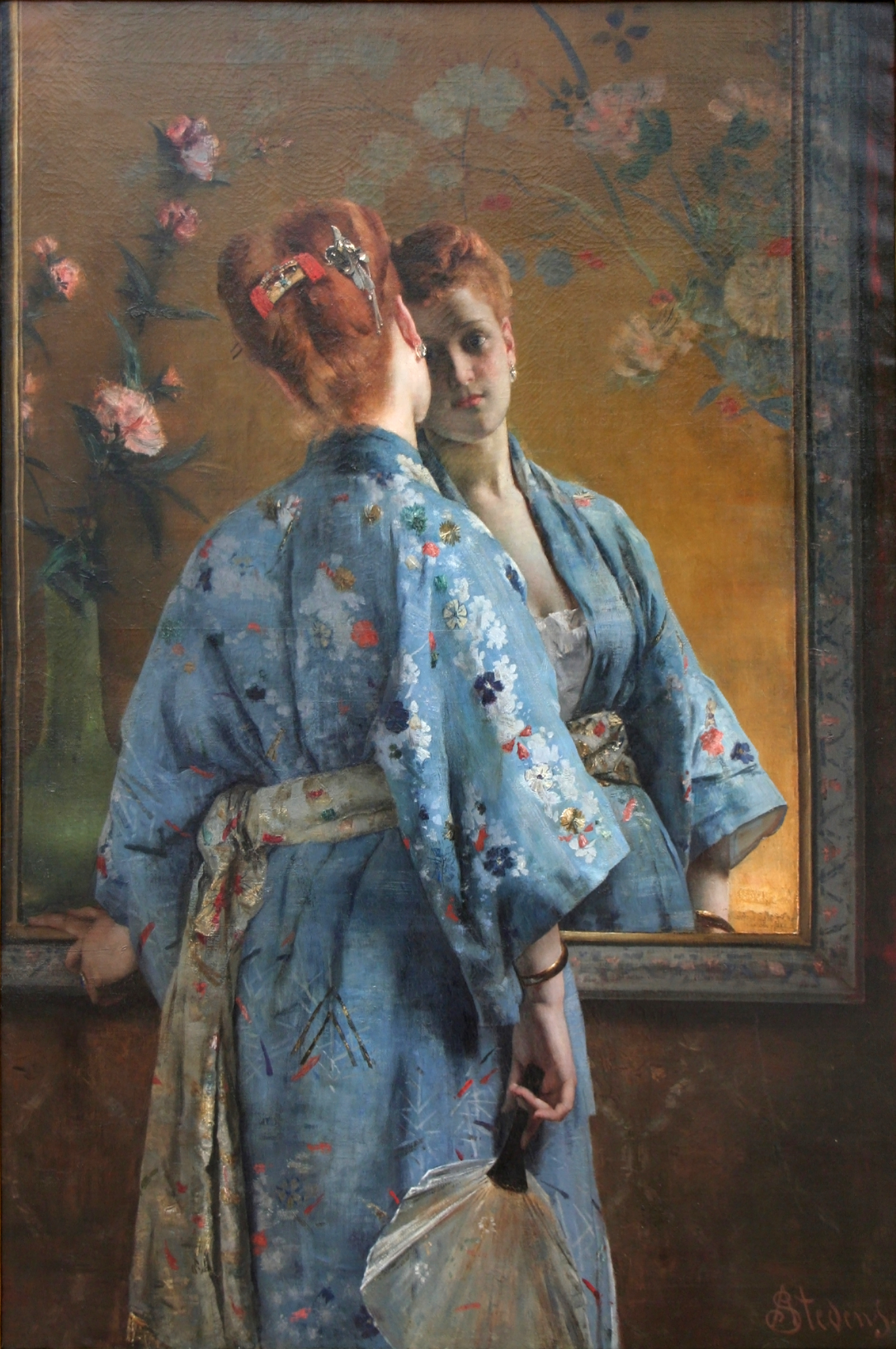
La parisienne japonaise, 1872, Musée d'art moderne et d'art contemporain, Liège

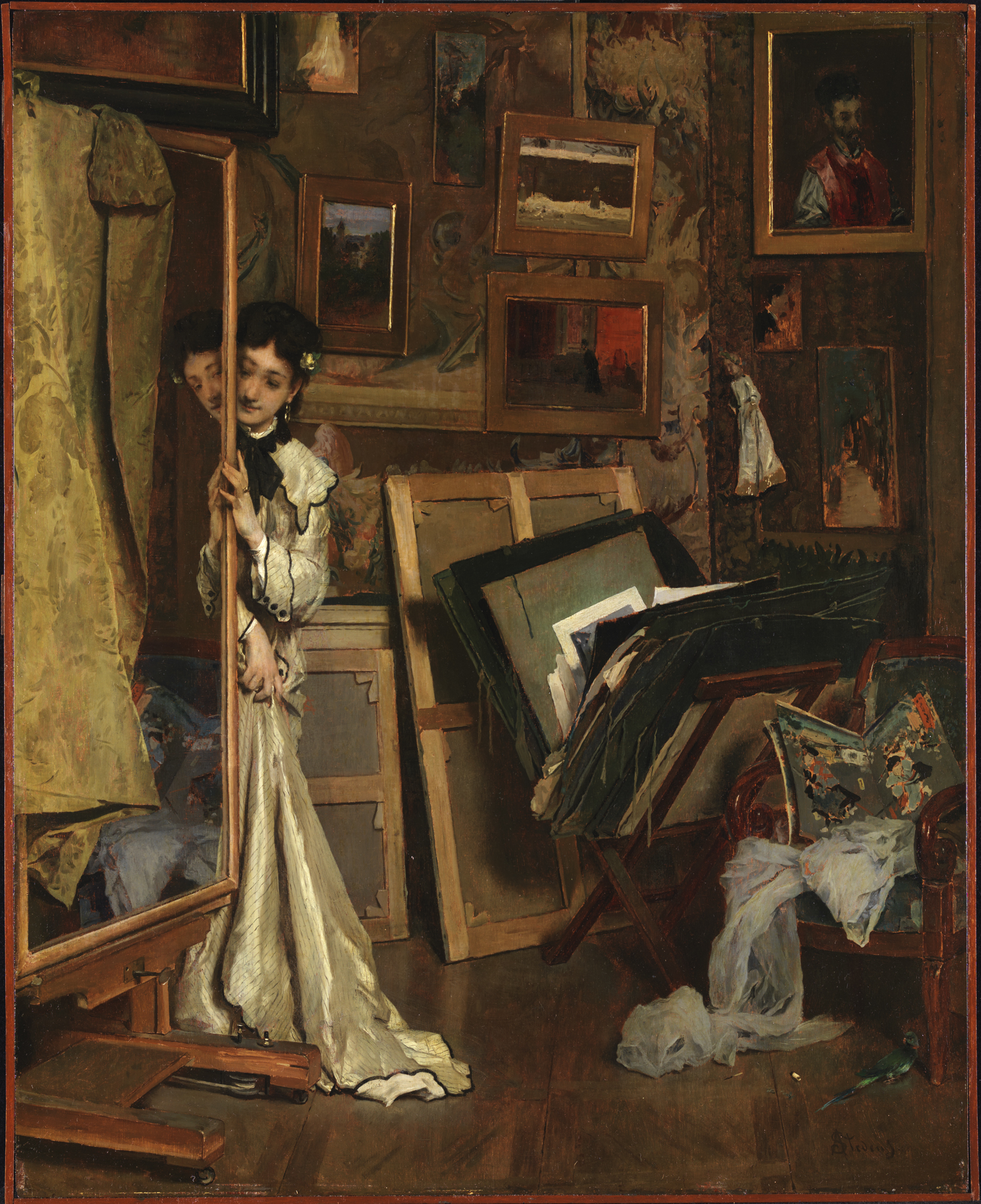
The Psyché (My Studio), ca. 1871, Princeton University Art Museum

During the 1860s, Stevens became an immensely successful painter, known for his paintings of elegant modern women. His exhibits at the Salons in Paris and Brussels attracted favorable critical attention and buyers. An excellent example of his work during this time is La Dame en Rose or Woman in Pink (Royal Museums of Fine Arts of Belgium, Brussels), painted in 1866, which combines a view of a fashionably dressed woman in an interior with a detailed examination of Japanese objects, a fashionable taste called Japonisme of which Stevens was an early enthusiast. He tended to use the same models over and over again, and not all of them were aristocratic. "At least three of his frequent models can be identified in the infamous Book of the Courtesans, a top secret leather bound book containing the surveillance files of the Paris vice squad", writes author Summer Brennan.

In 1863, he received the Legion of Honor (Chevalier) from the French government. In 1867, he won a first-class medal at the Universal Exposition in Paris, where he and Jan August Hendrik Leys were the stars of the Belgian section, and was promoted to Officer of the Legion of Honor. His friends included Édouard Manet, Edgar Degas, Charles Baudelaire, Berthe Morisot, James Abbott McNeill Whistler, Frédéric Bazille, and Puvis de Chavannes, and he was a regular in the group that gathered at the Café Guerbois in Paris.

Stevens fought for the French during the siege of Paris in the Franco-Prussian War, but returned to Belgium with his wife and family before the Paris Commune. They returned after the war, and Stevens continued to achieve critical acclaim as well as great success with collectors. In 1875, he bought a grand house and garden in Paris on rue des Martyrs, which appeared in his paintings as well as those of other artists, including Édouard Manet's The Croquet Party (Städel Museum, Frankfurt am Main) from 1873. (He had to leave the house in 1880, however, to make way for the construction of a new street, which was named after him.) In 1878, he was made a Commander of the Legion of Honor and received another first-class medal at the Salon.

Despite earning a considerable income through the sale of his paintings, Stevens found that a combination of bad investments and excessive spending caused him great financial difficulties during the 1880s. An additional expense came from summers by the sea, which a doctor told Stevens in 1880 were essential for his health. Thus the artist was glad to agree when the Paris dealer Georges Petit offered him 50,000 francs to finance his vacation in exchange for the paintings Stevens produced during that time. This deal, which lasted for three years, resulted in the sea becoming an important subject for him, and over the rest of his career, he painted hundreds of views of popular resorts along the Normandy coast and the Midi in the south. Many of them are painted in a sketchy style that shows the influence of the Impressionists. Stevens also began to take private students, including Sarah Bernhardt, who became a close personal friend, and William Merritt Chase. Other students were Berthe Art, Charles Bell Birch, Jules Cayron, Marie Collart-Henrotin, Louise De Hem, Harriet Campbell Foss, Rosalie Lorraine Gill, Georgette Meunier, Lilla Cabot Perry, Jean-Paul Sinibaldi, and Fernand Toussaint.

== Late career ==
The single most important work from the second half of Stevens's career is the monumental Panorama du Siècle, 1789–1889, which he painted with Henri Gervex. Stevens painted the women and details and Gervex the men, with the help of fifteen assistants. It was shown to great acclaim at the International Exhibition held in Paris in 1889. He also received several great professional tributes. In 1895, a large exhibition of his work was held in Brussels. In 1900, Stevens was honored by the Ecole des Beaux-Arts in Paris with the first retrospective exhibition ever given to a living artist. Supported by patrons led by the Comtesse de Greffulhe, it achieved social cachet as well as popular success. In 1905, he was the only living artist allowed to exhibit in a retrospective show of Belgian art in Brussels. Despite these exhibitions, he was not able to sell enough of his work to manage well financially. Having outlived his brothers and most of his friends, he died in Paris in 1906, living alone in modest rooms, whilst still remaining in touch with his four children.

== Honours and legacy ==
- 1881: Grand Officer in the Order of Leopold.
- Rue Alfred Stevens, a street off Rue des Martyrs in the 9th arrondissement of Paris, is named after him.

== Selected works ==
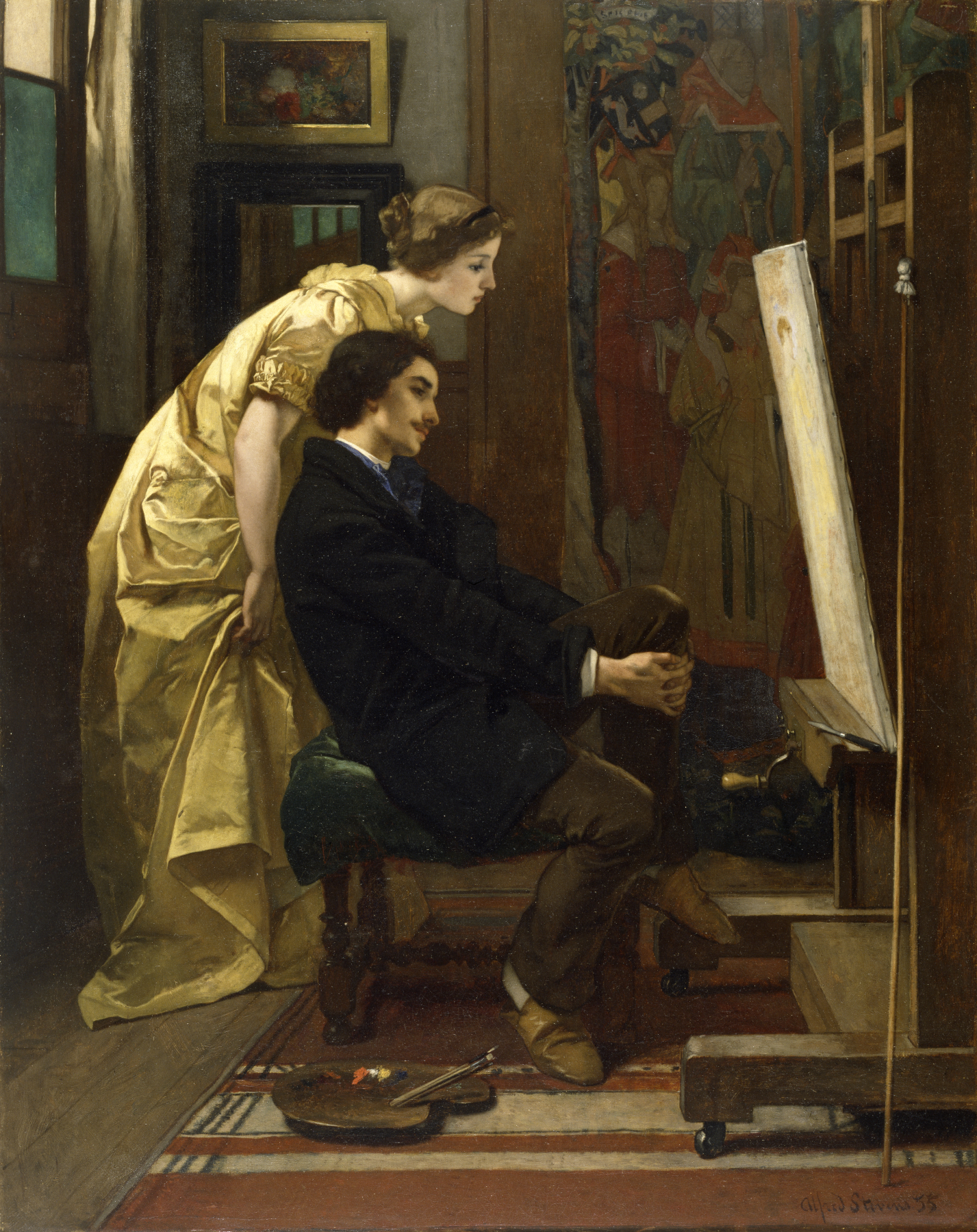
The Painter and His Model, 1855

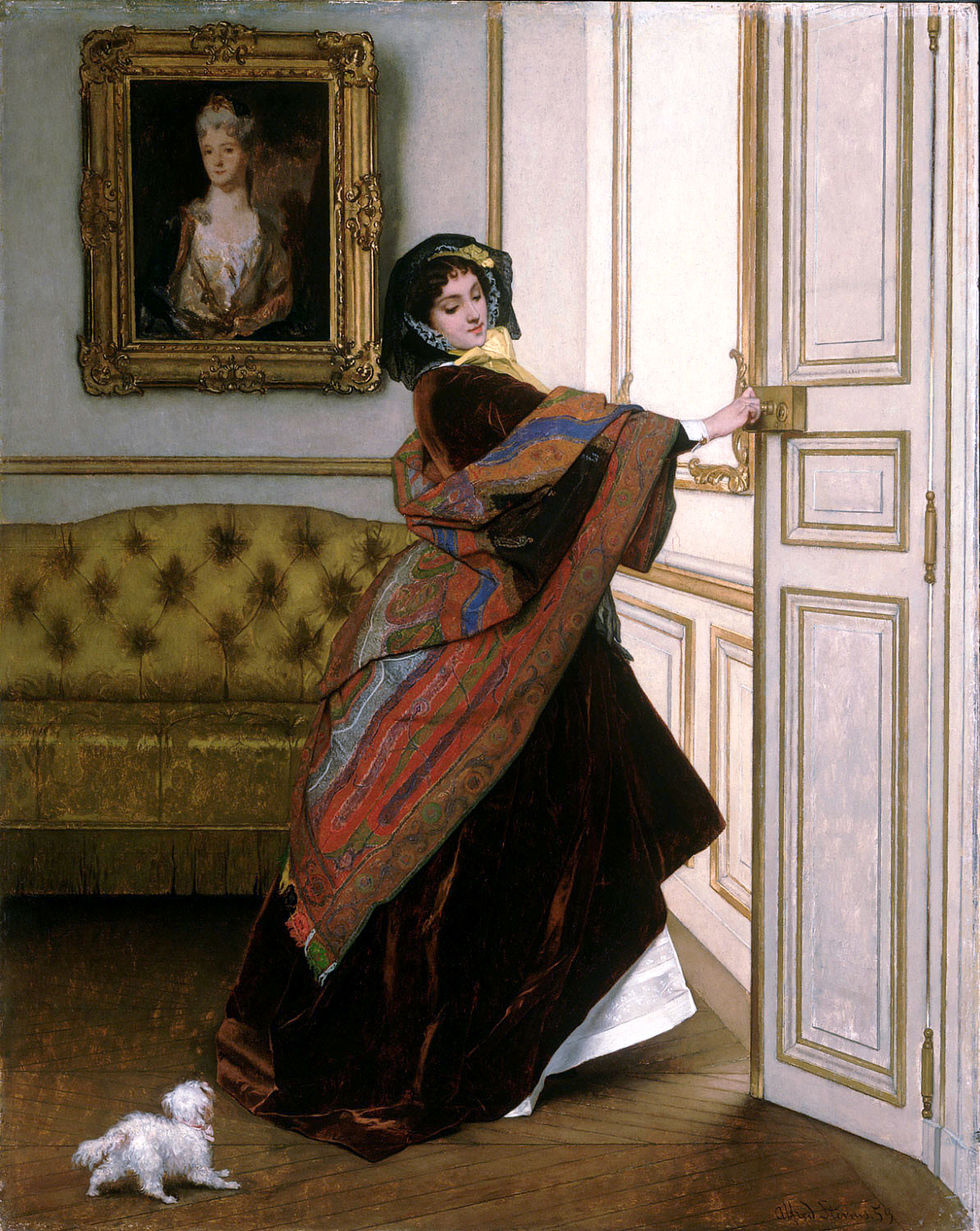
Will You Go Out With Me Fido?, 1859

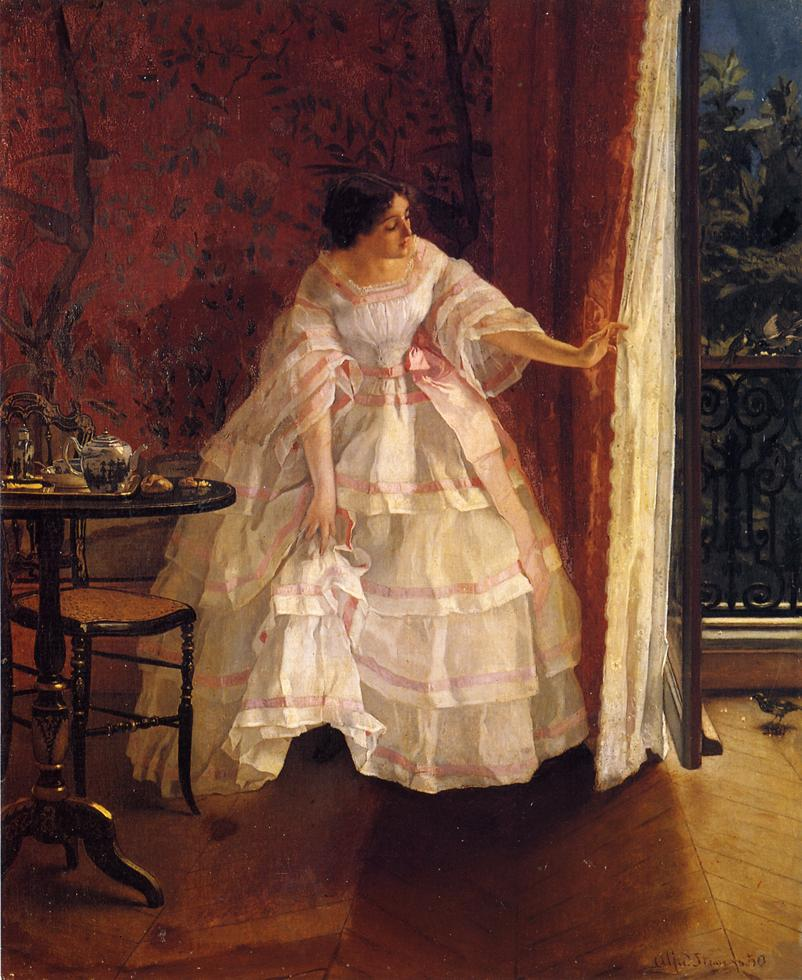
Lady at a Window Feeding Birds, ca. 1859

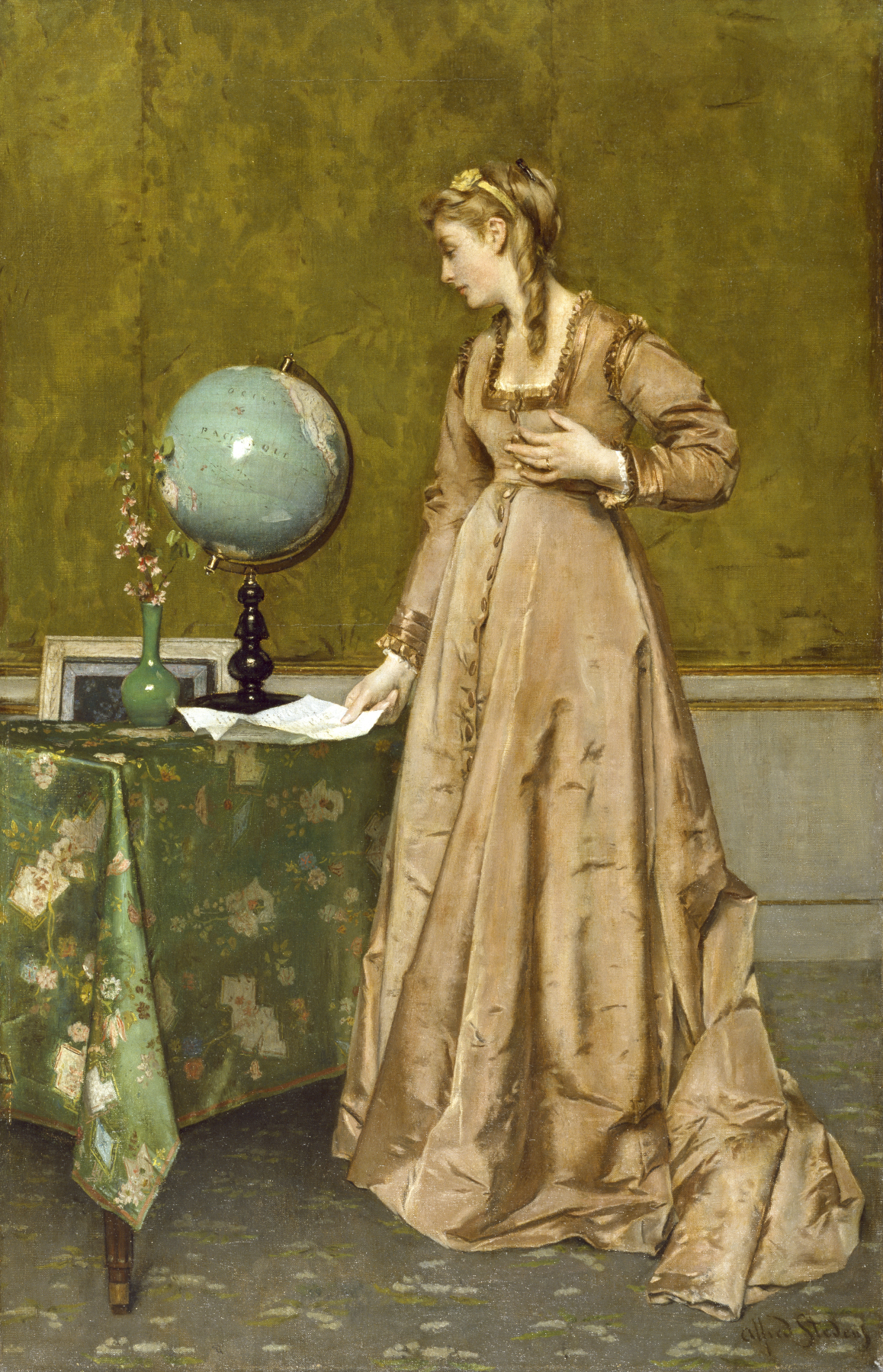
News from Afar, 1860 (Exhibition: "Salute to Belgium, 1980)

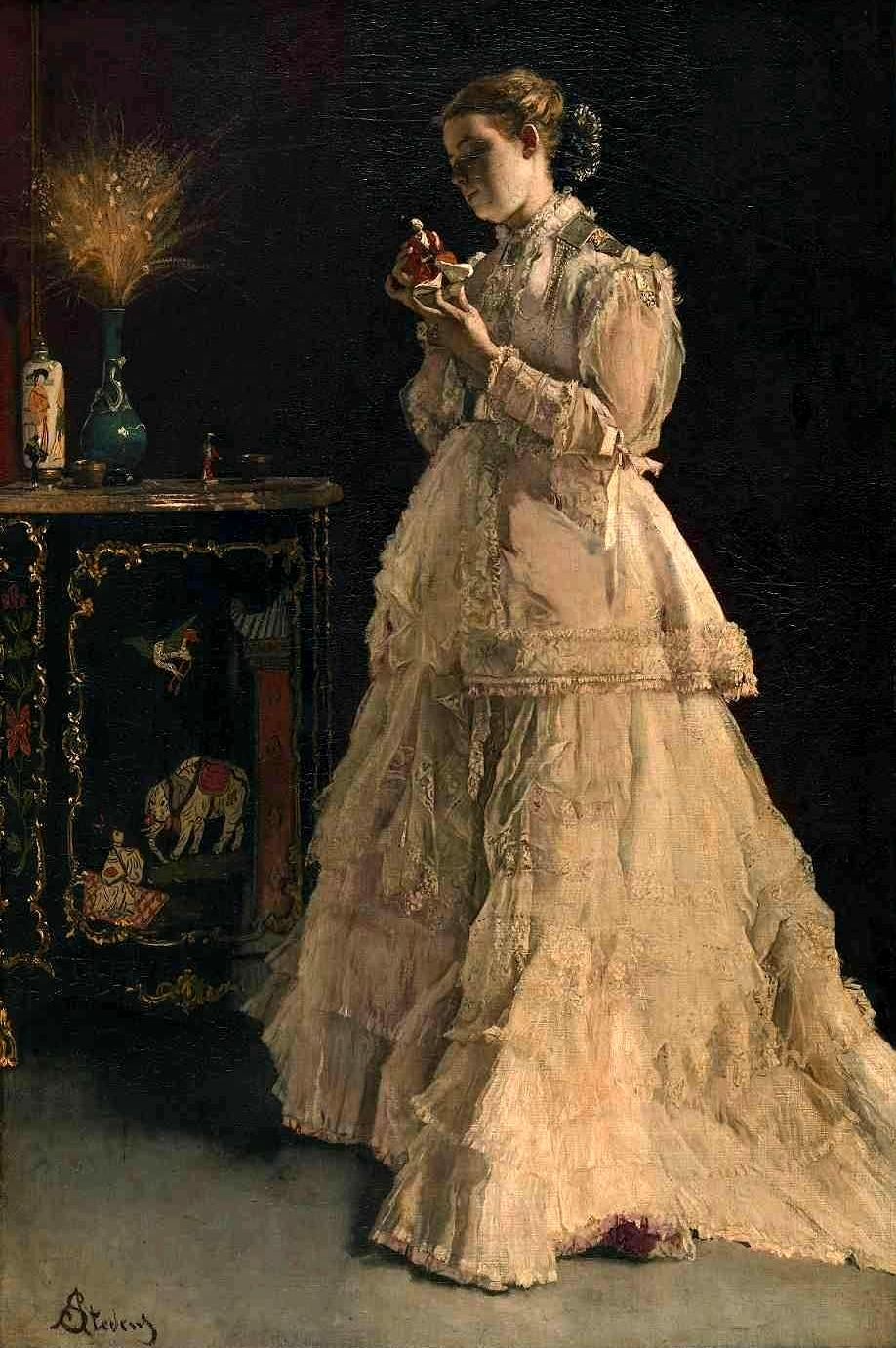
The Lady in Pink, 1866

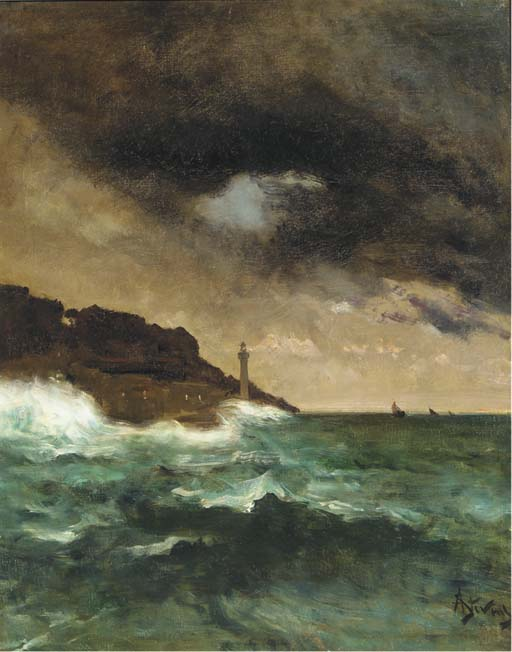
Lighthouse at Dusk

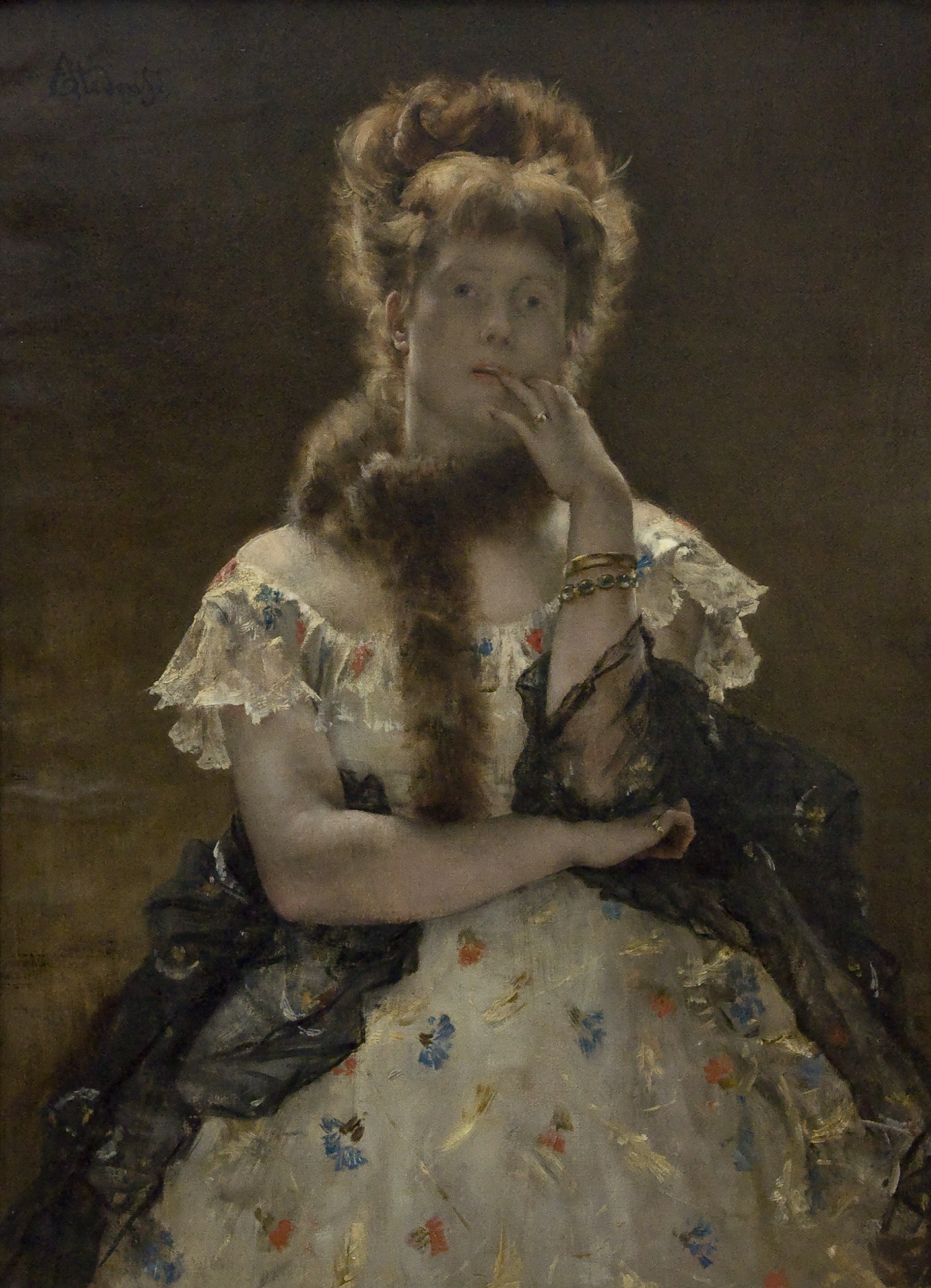
The Parisian Sphinx, 1875–1877

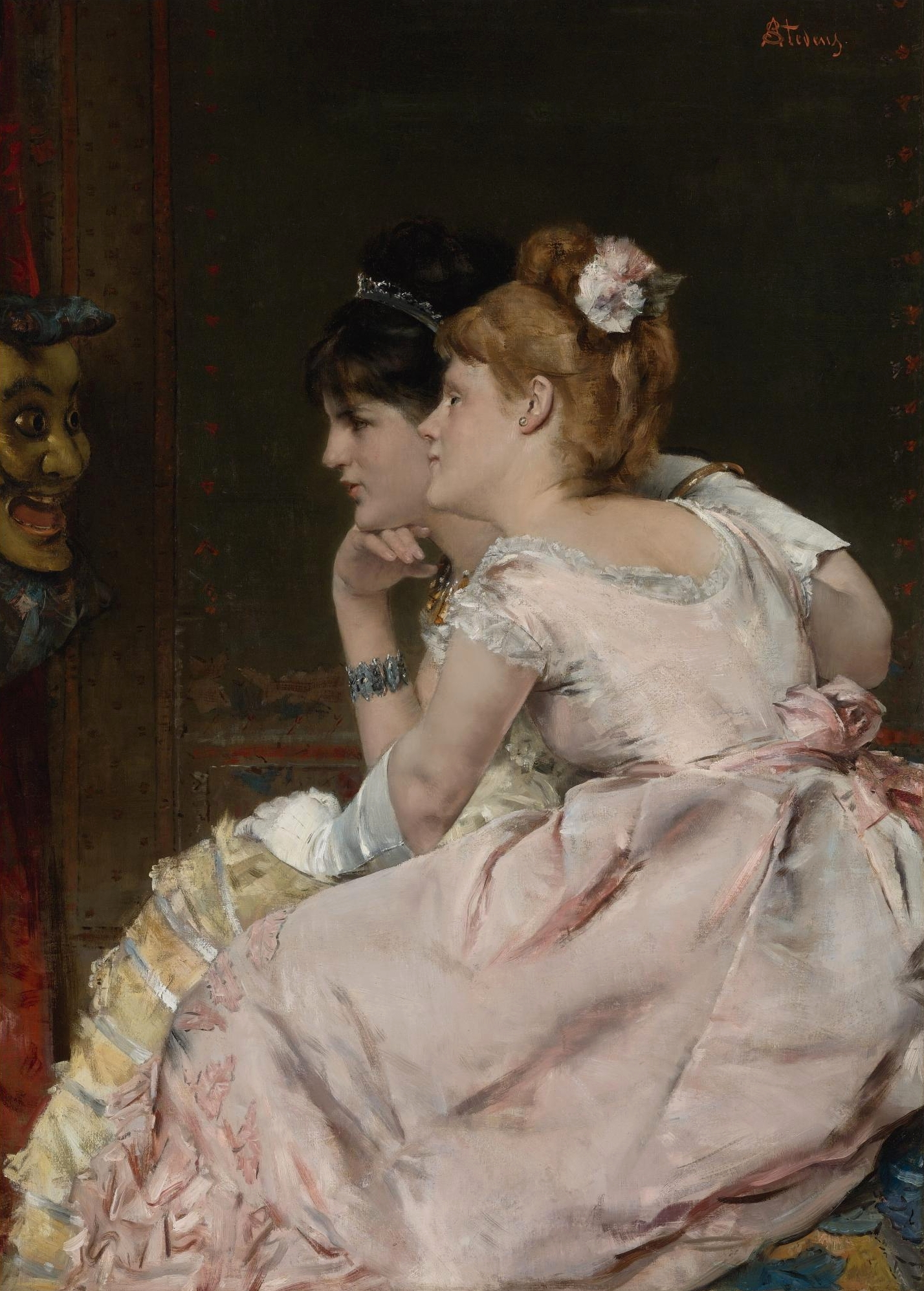
The Japanese mask, ca. 1877

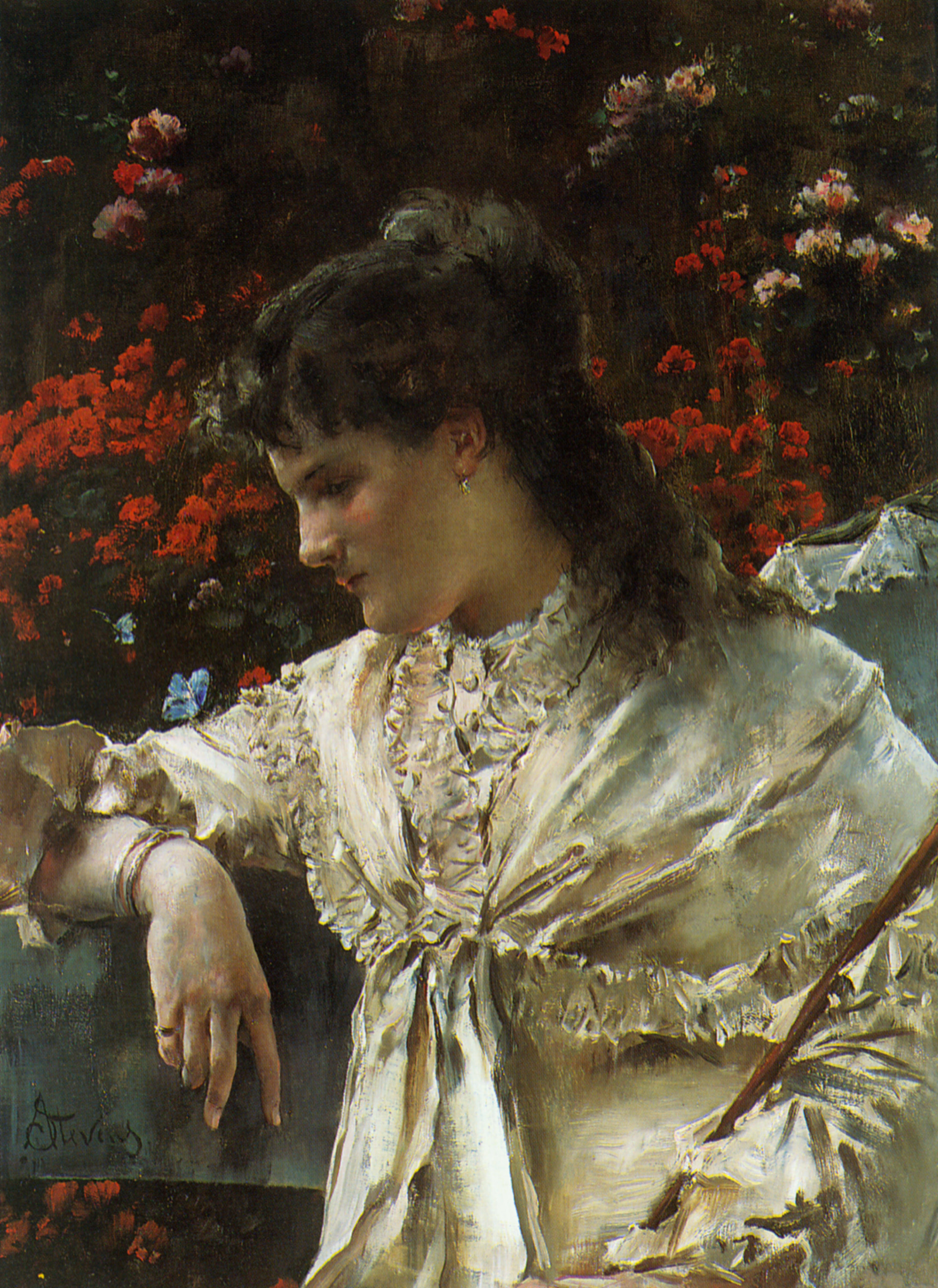
Rêverie, ca. 1878

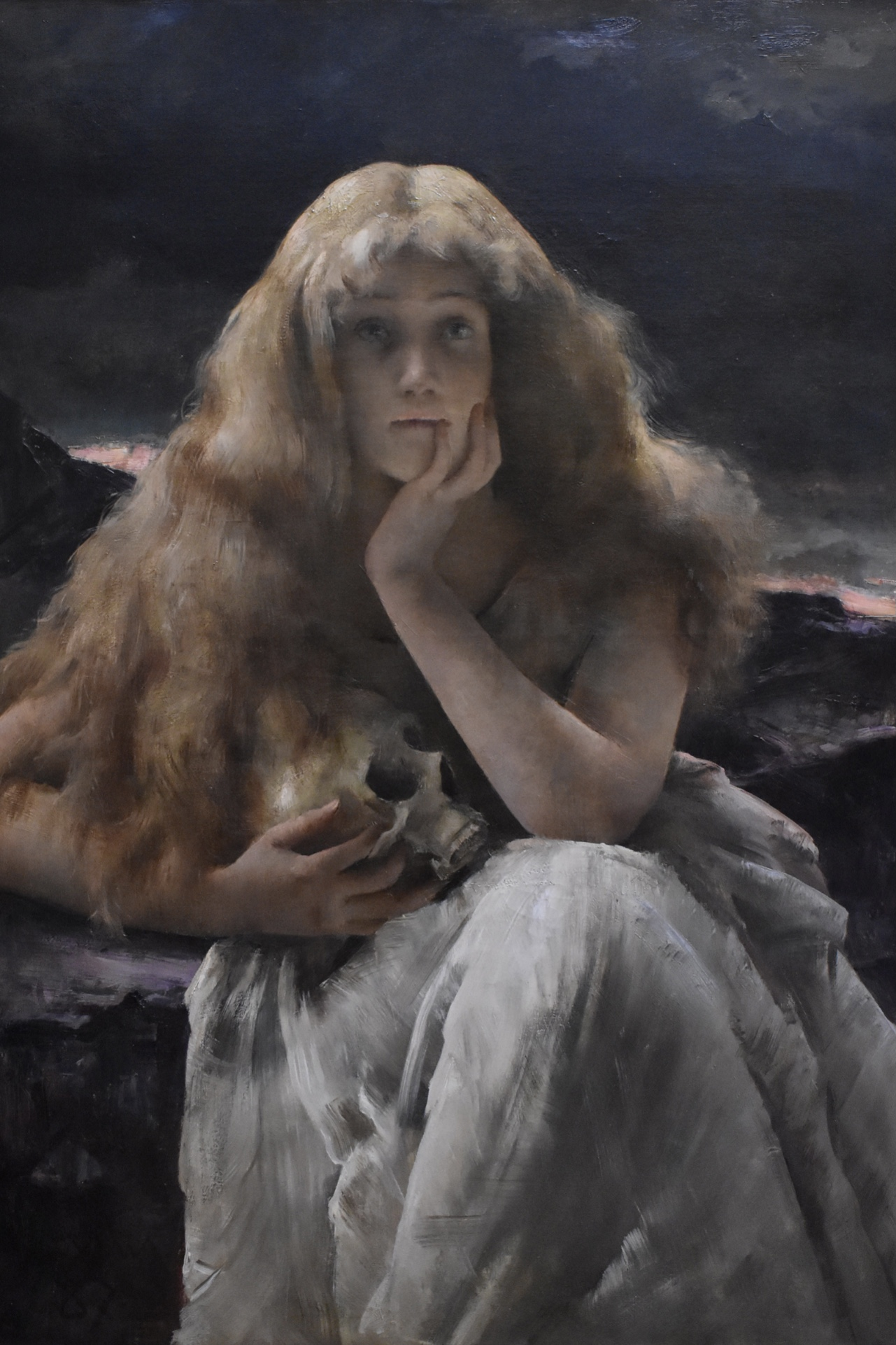
Maria Magdalena, 1887

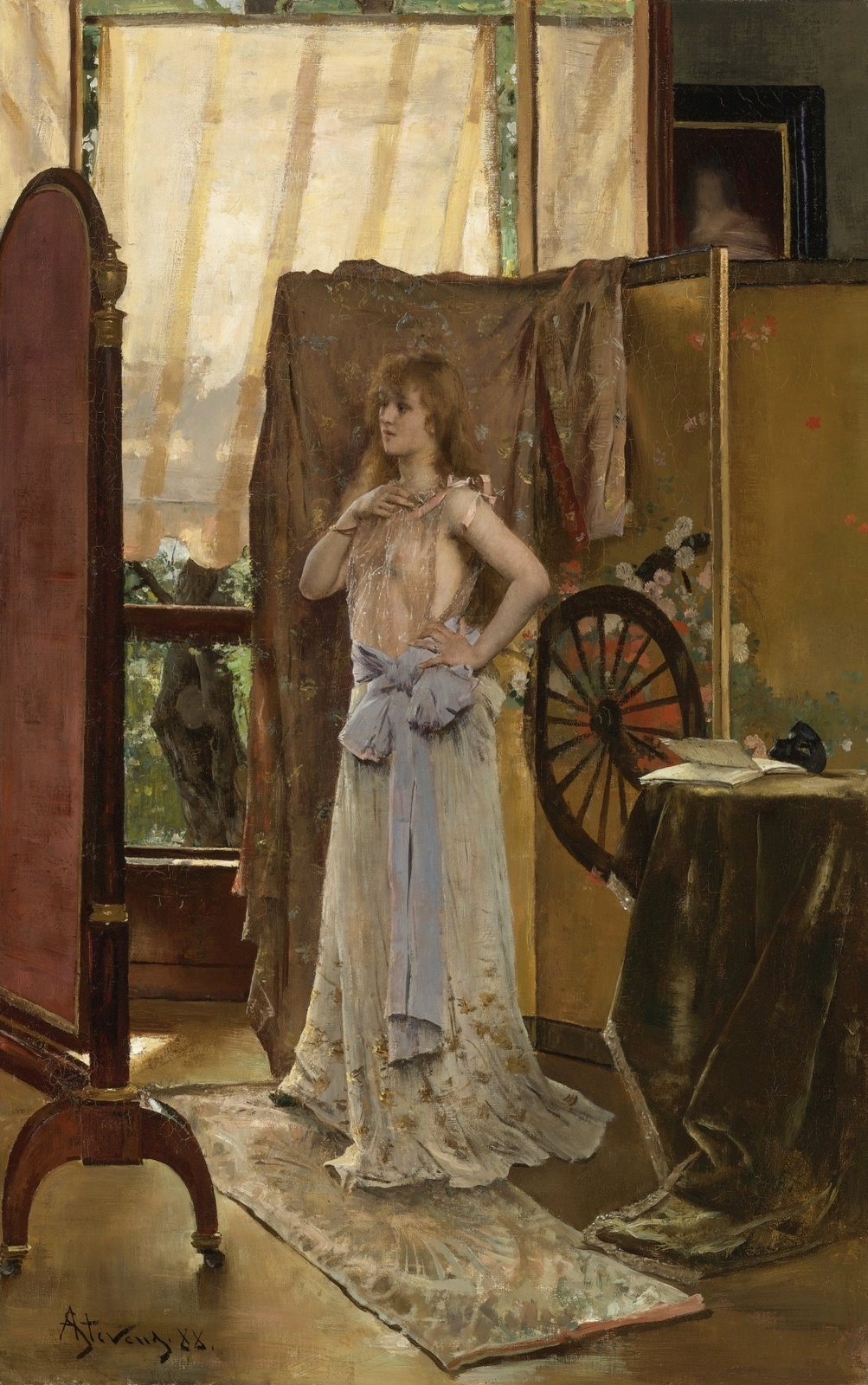
The Study of the Role, 1888

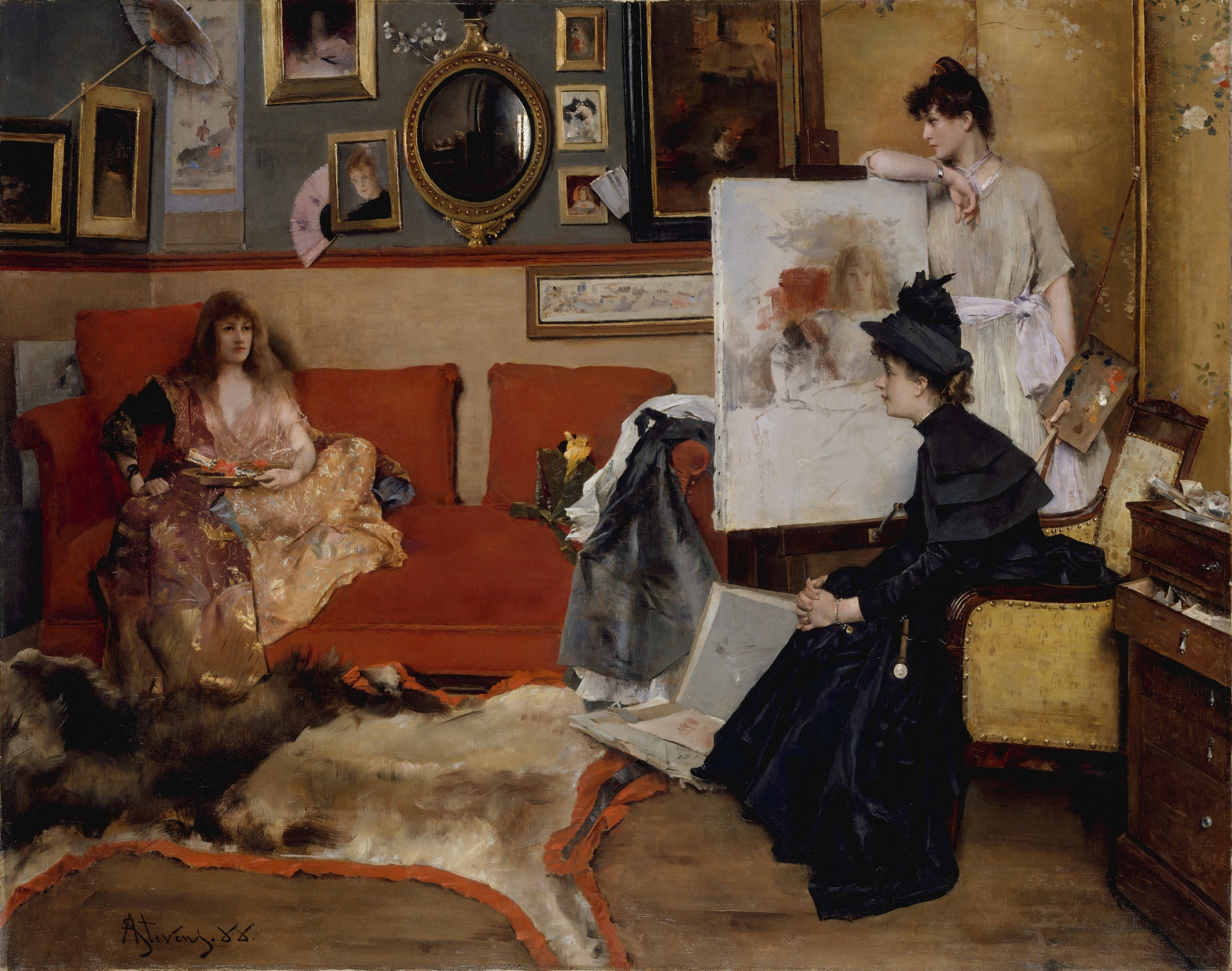
In the Studio, 1888

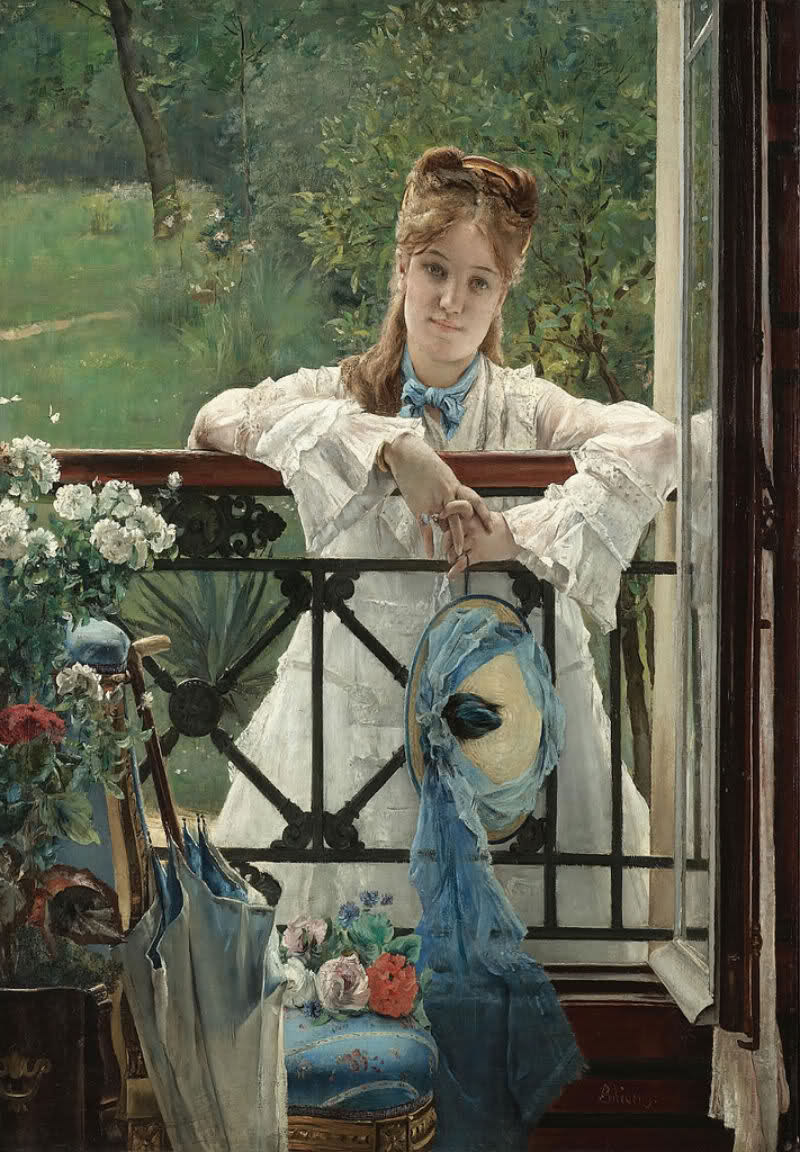
The New Blue Ribbon, 1894

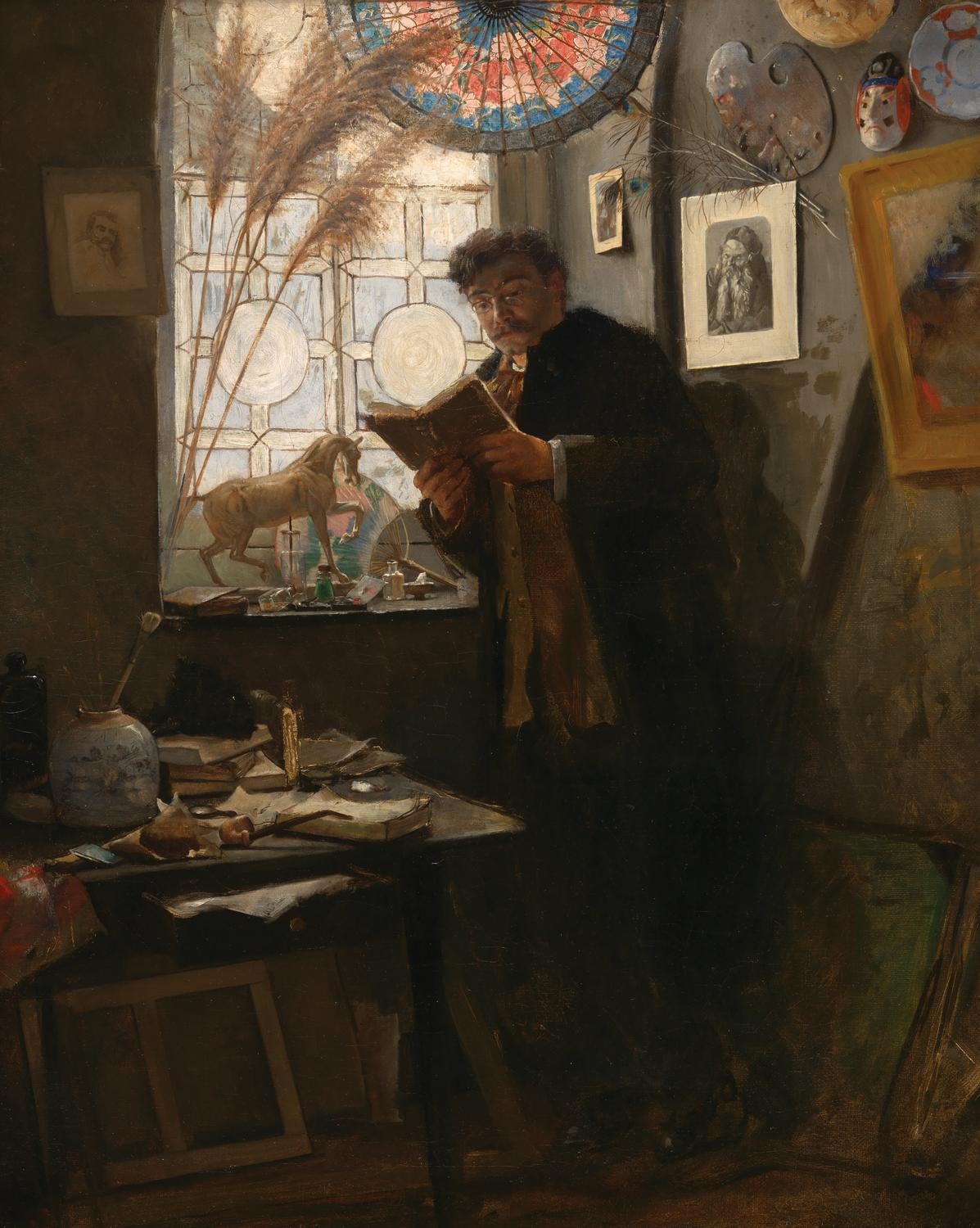
Camille Lemonnier in the Artist's Studio

A duchess (the blue dress) 1866

== See also ==
- 13058 Alfredstevens
