= Jean-Paul Sinibaldi =

French painter (1857–1909)

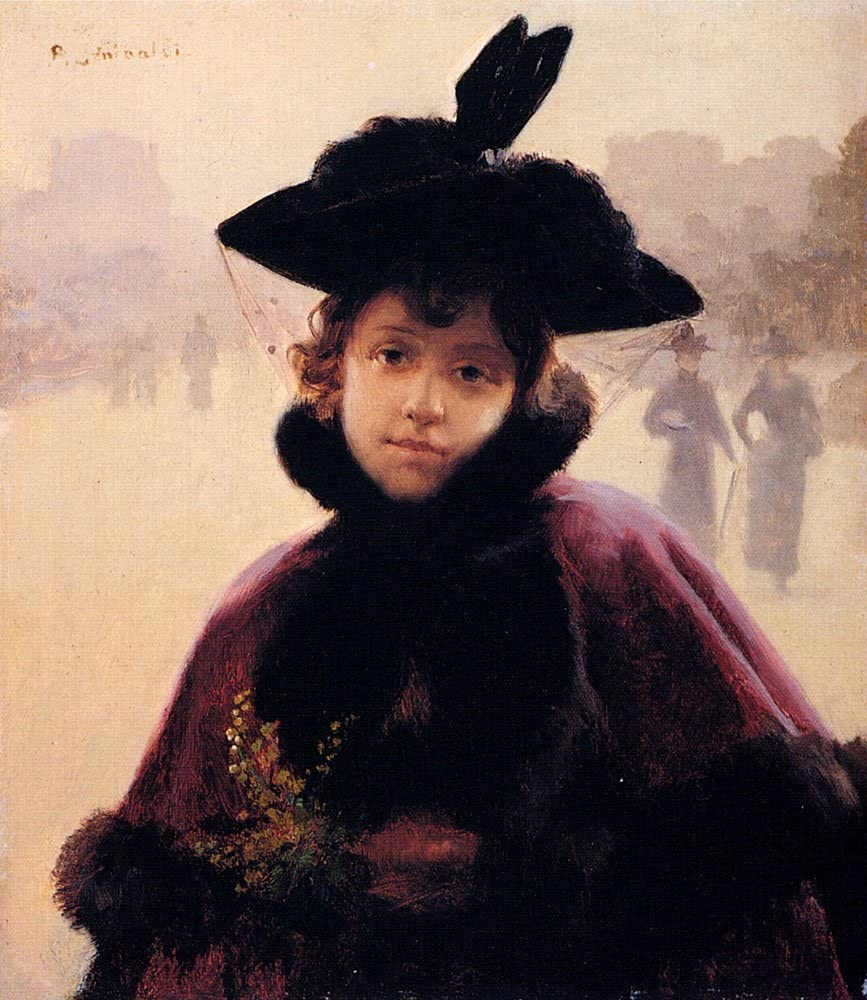
Elegant Lady on a Paris Street

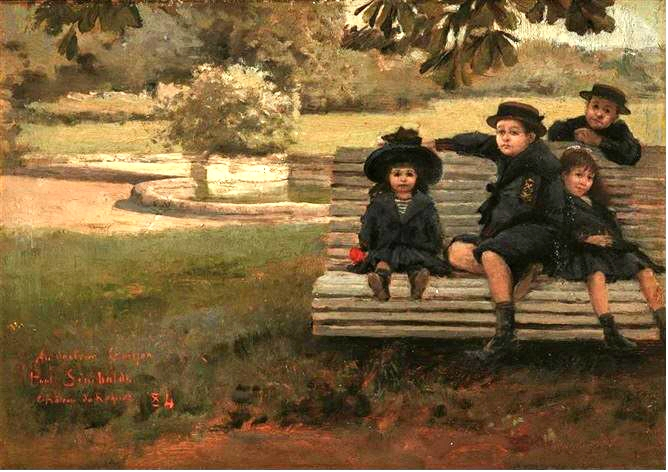
Children at the Parc du Château

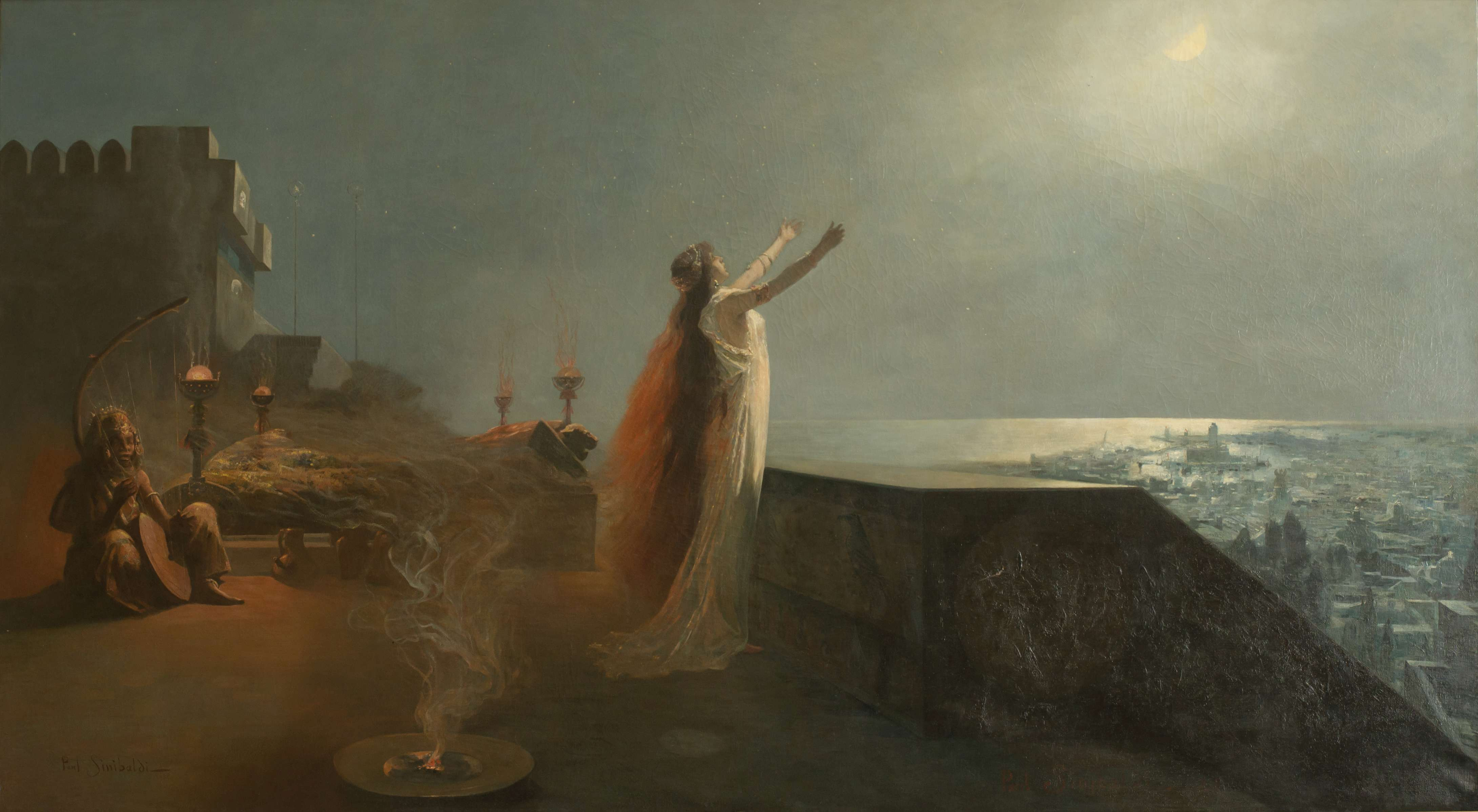
Salammbô (1885)

Jean-Paul Raphaël Sinibaldi (19 May 1857, Paris – 17 January 1909, Bourg-en-Bresse) was a French painter who specialized in portraits and country scenes.

== Biography ==
He studied at the École des Beaux-Arts, under the direction of Alexandre Cabanel and Alfred Stevens. In 1881, with the support of his teachers, he was able to begin participating in showings at the Salon. Five years later, he was honored with the Prix de Rome and, in 1888, received a large travel grant, given by the "Conseil supérieur des beaux-arts".

The following year, he was awarded a bronze medal at the Exposition Universelle. He won a silver medal at the Exposition Universelle of 1900 and, that same year was named a Knight in the Legion of Honor.

Most of his clients were private individuals, but he received a few public contracts; notably, decorations for a hall in the Hôtel de Ville, and in the wedding chapel at the town hall in Lille. In 1897, he was commissioned to design an office for the Ministry of Economic Affairs.

His works may be seen at the Musée Paul-Valéry and the Musée Baron-Martin.
