= What is Called Vagrancy =

Painting by Alfred Stevens

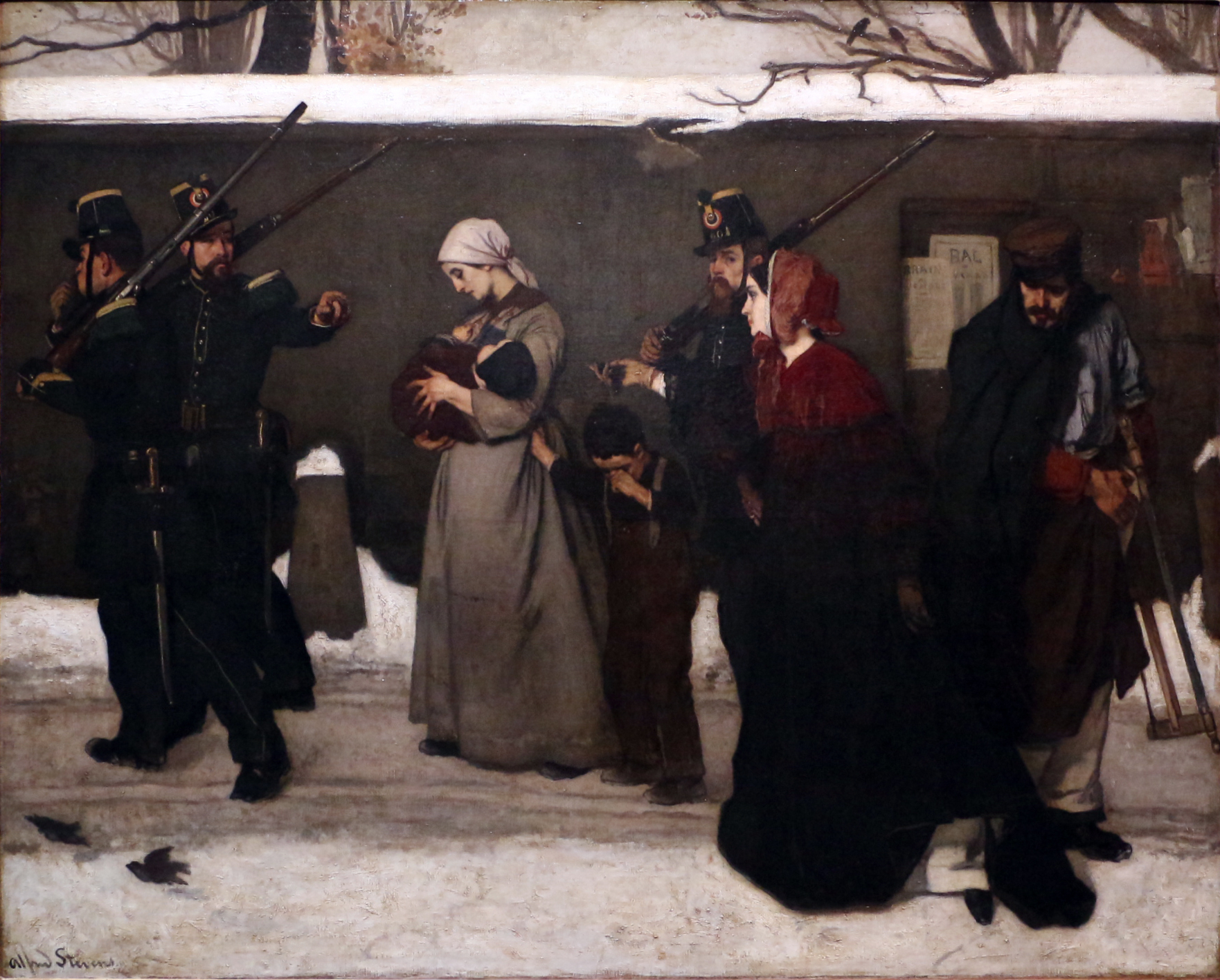
- Artist: Alfred Stevens
- Year: 1854
- Medium: Oil on canvas
- Dimensions: 111.8 cm × 77.3 cm (44 in × 30.4 in)
- Location: Musée d'Orsay, Paris

What is Called Vagrancy (French: Ce que l'on appelle le vagabondage) is an early oil on canvas painting by Belgian painter Alfred Stevens. This painting is representative of the early part of Stevens' career, when he was keen on representing the squalor of the time through realist painting.

== Context ==
Alfred Stevens was born in Brussels in 1823, and moved to Paris (where he would spend the rest of his life) in the 1840s.

His early work, such as portraiture of soldiers and depiction of social scenes, was part of a pictorial trend that emerged in both Belgium and France in those years, namely, social realism. Between 1845 and 1857, Stevens focused on contemporary hard daily life as a subject. At the Salon of 1853, for instance, he showed drunken carnival-goers returning home; at the Salon of 1855 during the Exposition Universelle, he made his breakthrough with Ce qu’on appelle le vagabondage (This is What They Call Vagrancy; What is called Vagrancy) or The Hunters of Vincennes (Les Chasseurs de Vincennes), today housed at the Musée d'Orsay, Paris. The realist oil was presented at the 1855 exposition together with three other paintings by Stevens: La Sieste, Le Premier jour du dévouement and La Mendiante.

The fact that as a new, inexperienced foreign painter Stevens had some success with his paintings, selling both is centerpieces of the 1853 Salon and 1855 world's fair, probably had more to do with his skills rather than the choice of subject.

While some critics, such as Ernest Gebaüer, praised the painting and described the moving qualities of the scene (Cette scène est touchante, Gebaüer, 1855), others noted some anomaly, the left foot of the kind passer-by being strangely distant from her body.

Emperor Napoleon III thought the contents so shocking (a woman giving a beggar money to prevent her being locked up with her children by the police, which was the fate of vagrants without income) that he asked Count Émilien de Nieuwerkerke to have it removed.

Stevens attached much importance to the tradition of Flemish and Dutch (genre) painting, and held a great admiration for the technical precision and illusionistic representation, the unparalleled reproduction of fabrics, and the symbolism of the early Netherlandish painters. He was strongly influenced by the Old Flemish Masters, especially Johannes Vermeer. This earned him comparisons with some highly respected old masters (such as Gerard ter Borch), a fairly common practice in the second half of the nineteenth century, linked to the rise of national schools. Even though Stevens lived the major part of his life in Paris, the French critics still considered him a Flemish (Belgian), indebted to the rich artistic heritage of the Low Countries.

Over the 19th century, law and order, or the management and control (meaning surveillance and repression) of individuals liable to disrupt the social order, became increasingly a popular issue in France. A worker's record book, an ID for use within national borders, and the version of this document issued to those who fell into indigence, served not only for identification but also for the surveillance of a worker's movements; it could also be used to track itinerant merchants, street artists, the indigent and the vagrant.

A decree dated 5 July 1808 had prohibited begging and created departmental depots where able-bodied beggars would be taken and employed. The attribute “vagabond” made the situation worse, with “vagrant beggars” being taken to detention centres. The French Penal Code of 1810 considered begging a crime and vagrancy likewise. While beggars were not clearly defined, vagrants were clearly identified as “unscrupulous people [i.e.] those who have no certain place of residence or means of subsistence and who do not exercise any trade or profession”. Beggars and vagrants could be sentenced to from three to six months’ imprisonment, or even two to five years if they were carrying weapons. This sentence could be followed by a further period of enforced labour in begging depots. During the Second Republic, the electoral law of May 31, 1850 further alienated beggars and vagabonds, separating the homeless from the rest of society by prolonging the period of residence required in order to be able to vote in a particular commune or canton, from six months (law of March 15, 1849) to three years.

== Painting ==
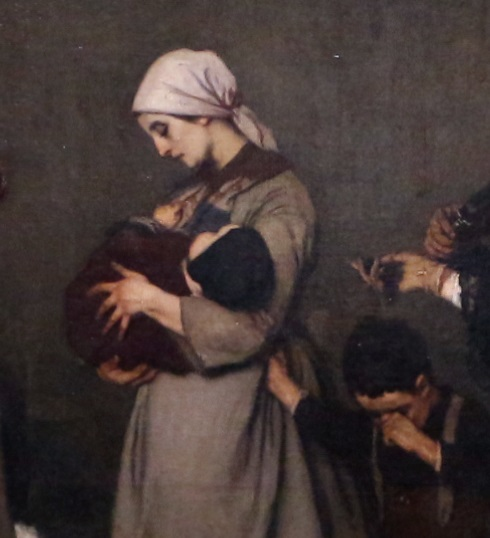
Female vagrant and her children

A Parisian street is the setting for this urban drama. Soldiers lead a mother and her ragged children away to prison for the crime of vagrancy. An elegant woman is trying to intercede with the soldiers, while a frustrated workman stands on her right. The attempt is doomed to failure as shown by the soldier's gesture of refusal. A similar scene can be found in Victor Hugo's Things Seen.

Stevens approaches the theme of poverty from a political rather than a social angle, choosing to depict not only individual generosity (represented by the wealthy woman attempting to intervene with the soldiers), but also State repression. The State, personified here by the soldiers (one of whom appears to reject the charitable gesture of the wealthy lady), does not protect but rather seems to consider the homeless mother and her young children (the weakest and most fragile in society) as harmful, dangerous, even criminal.

The choice of the wintry season, the gloomy light, the dark shades of the clothes and uniforms, the absence of a horizon (blocked by the dark grey wall in the background which fills the entire width of the painting), the simplicity of the characters (the cold and unwavering soldiers, the mother resigned, the lame worker with his crutch, the tearful child, and the wealthy woman attempting an act of generosity) all contribute to making this scene spontaneously moving.

On the long grey wall, posters referring to property sales ("sale by auction") and the pleasures of high society ("ball"), conflict with the poverty and sorrow described in the painting.

The different social groups who occupy the same urban space find themselves side by side here in a moving composition, and the role of the State, purely repressive, does not come out well.

Stevens' objective was to denounce the poor living conditions in the towns and the cruel treatment meted out to those who lived there. As mentioned, the message struck a chord with Napoleon III who, upon seeing this painting at the 1855 Universal Exhibition, supposedly remarked: "That will not happen again." Accordingly, the Emperor ordered that any vagrants should henceforth be taken to the Conciergerie, not on foot, but hidden away in a closed carriage.

== Sources ==
- "Alfred Stevens What is called vagrancy". Musée d'Orsay.
- rène Delage. "The Light Infantrymen of Vincennes or This is What They Call "Vagrancy"". Napoleon.org.
- "Notice de l'œuvre Ce que l'on appelle le vagabondage". Musée d'Orsay.
- Marjan Sterckx. "Alfred Stevens". Association of Historians of Nineteenth-Century Art.
