= Camille Lemonnier in the Artist's Studio =

Painting by Alfred Stevens

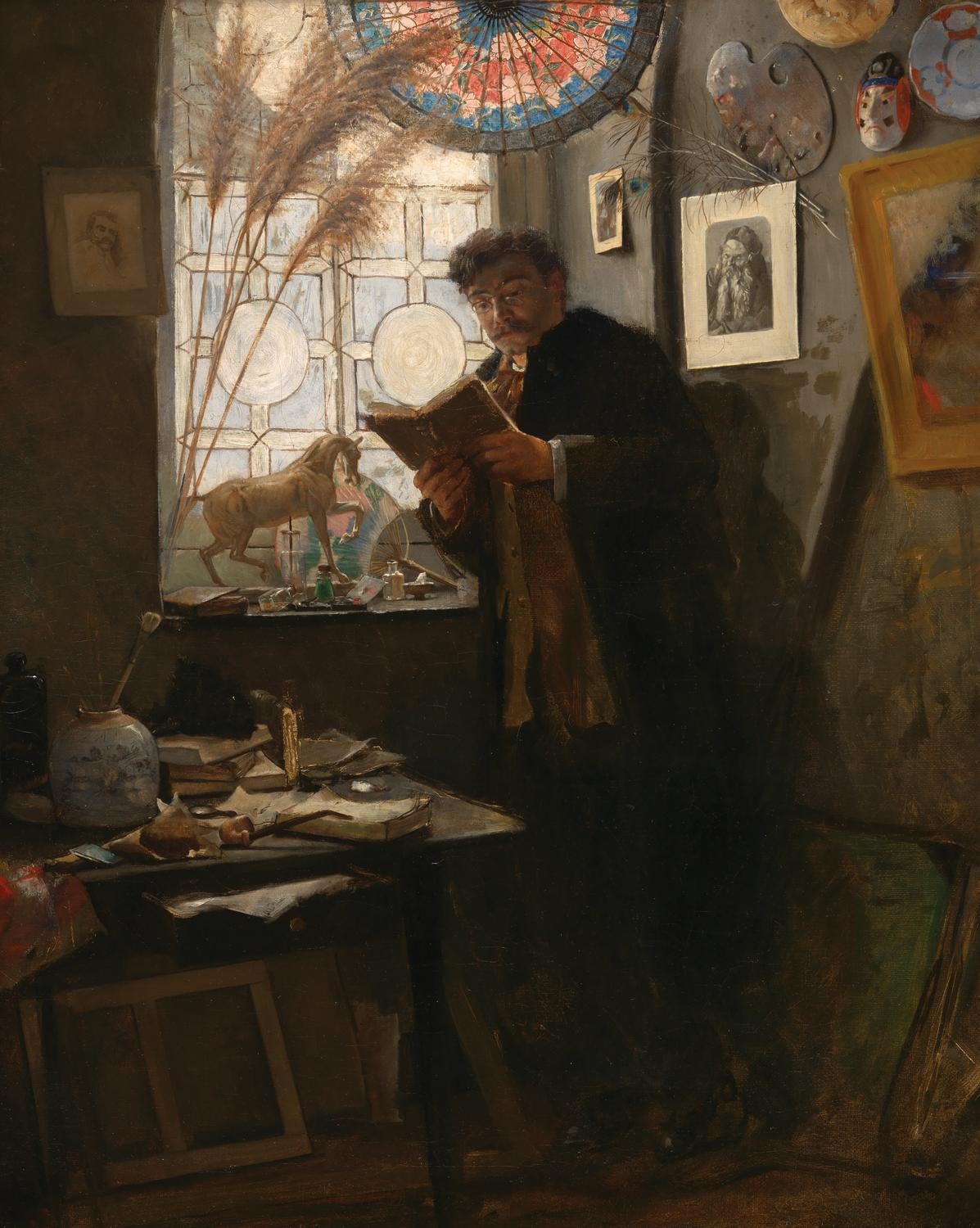
- Artist: Alfred Stevens
- Year: Late 19th century
- Medium: Oil on canvas
- Dimensions: 61 cm × 48 cm (18.9 in × 30.4 in)
- Location: Royal Museums of Fine Arts of Belgium; Brussels
- Owner: King Baudouin Foundation

Camille Lemonnier in the Artist's Studio (French: Camille Lemonnier dans l’atelier de l’artiste, Dutch: Camille Lemonnier in het atelier van de kunstenaar) is an oil on canvas painting by Belgian painter Alfred Stevens. The portrait was for many years part of a private collection in Paris, but in 2015 it was purchased by the Heritage Found, and is currently housed at the Royal Museums of Fine Arts in Brussels.

== Description ==
The work depicts Belgian author Camille Lemonnier in the artis's studio. He is reading a book while standing up. The studio's interior contains numerous peculiar objects including a reproduction of a drawing by Albrecht Dürer, a terracotta horse, a Noh theater mask on the wall, a fan, a paper umbrella, peacock feathers, and stalks of pampas grass by the window.

== History ==
The painting was executed by Alfred Stevens at the end of the 19th century.

The painting passed through several art collections, including that of the Parisian antiquarian André Fabius. In 2014, the Heritage Fund of the King Baudouin Foundation purchased the artwork.

In 2015, having been purchased by the Foundation, the painting was given on long-term loan to the Royal Museums of Fine Arts of Belgium in Brussels.
