= Florent Willems =

Belgian painter (1823–1905)

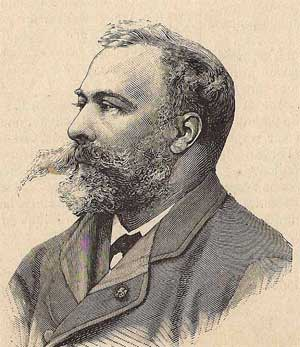
Florent Willems

Florent Willems or Florent Willems van Edeghem (8 January 1823 – 23 October 1905) was a Belgian painter and art restorer. He was successful with his genre scenes depicting a few figures in an interior executed in the style of the 17th century Flemish and Dutch Baroque. He was particularly praised for his ability to render realistically the materials of the clothes of his figures which earned him the nickname of the 'modern Ter Borch'.

== Life ==
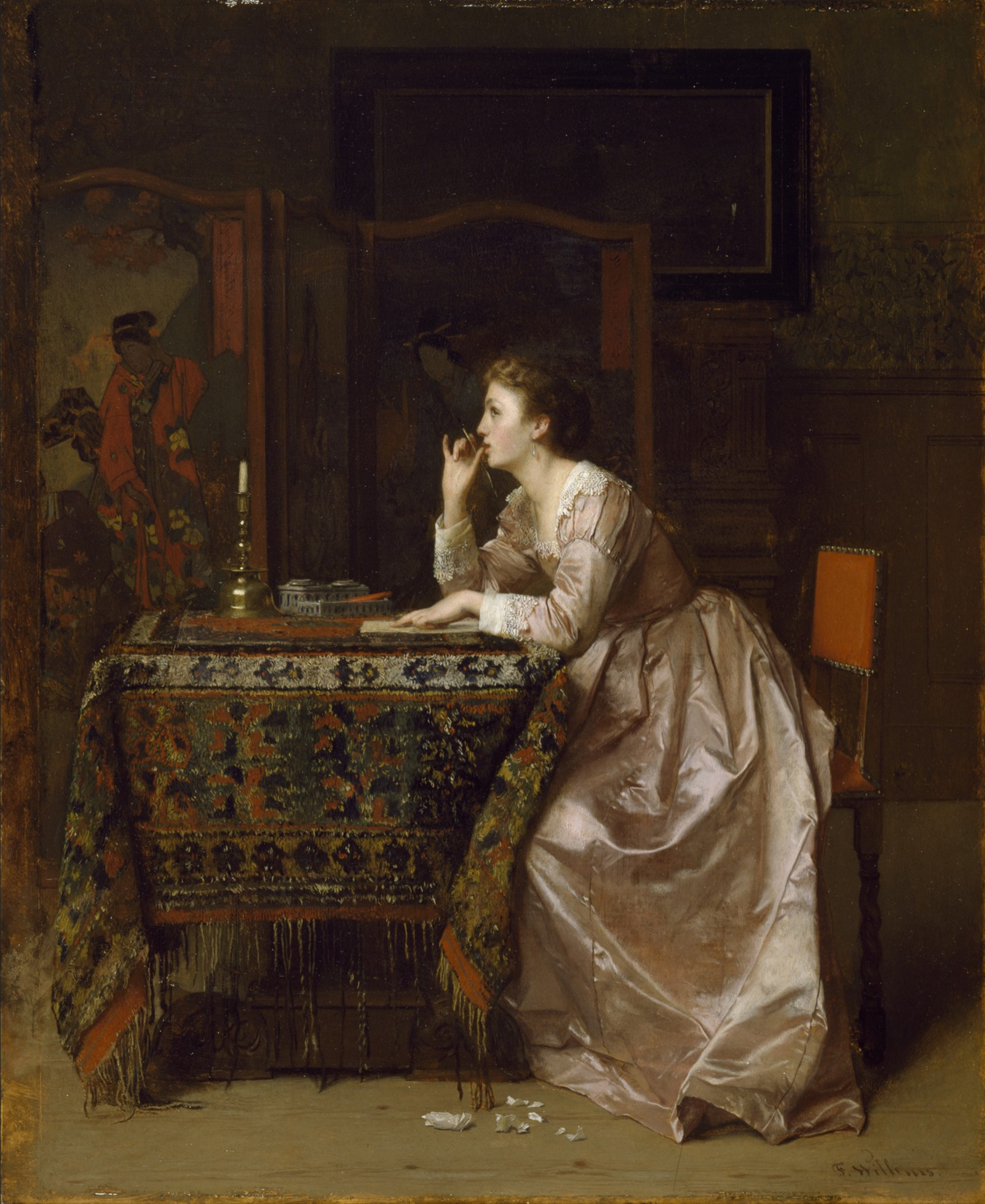
The Important Response

Willems was born in Liège as the son of Martin Adrien Willems, a teacher at the Lycée Imperial in that city. He studied art at the Academy of Mechelen, a city to which his family had moved. He then moved to Brussels where financial circumstances compelled him to work for the art dealer Héris as an art restorer. He copied and restored old pictures for the art dealer. At barely 18 years old he came to the attention of Hamilton Seymour, the English embassador to the Belgian king. Mr. Seymour gave him a commission to paint a portrait of himself with his wife and children.

He made his debut at the Brussels Salon in 1842 with a Music Lesson and a Guard-room scene. The king of Belgium Leopold I acquired the first painting. He subsequently exhibited regularly at the salons of Paris and Brussels. His submissions to the Paris Salon of 1844 won him golden medals third class. Around this time he settled in Paris, where his pictures enjoyed considerable popularity under the Second French Empire. Fellow Belgian artist Alfred Stevens joined him in 1849 in Paris and lived with him as well as worked for him in his studio. Willems' interest in depicting women in interiors clearly had an influence on Stevens' own choice of subject matter.

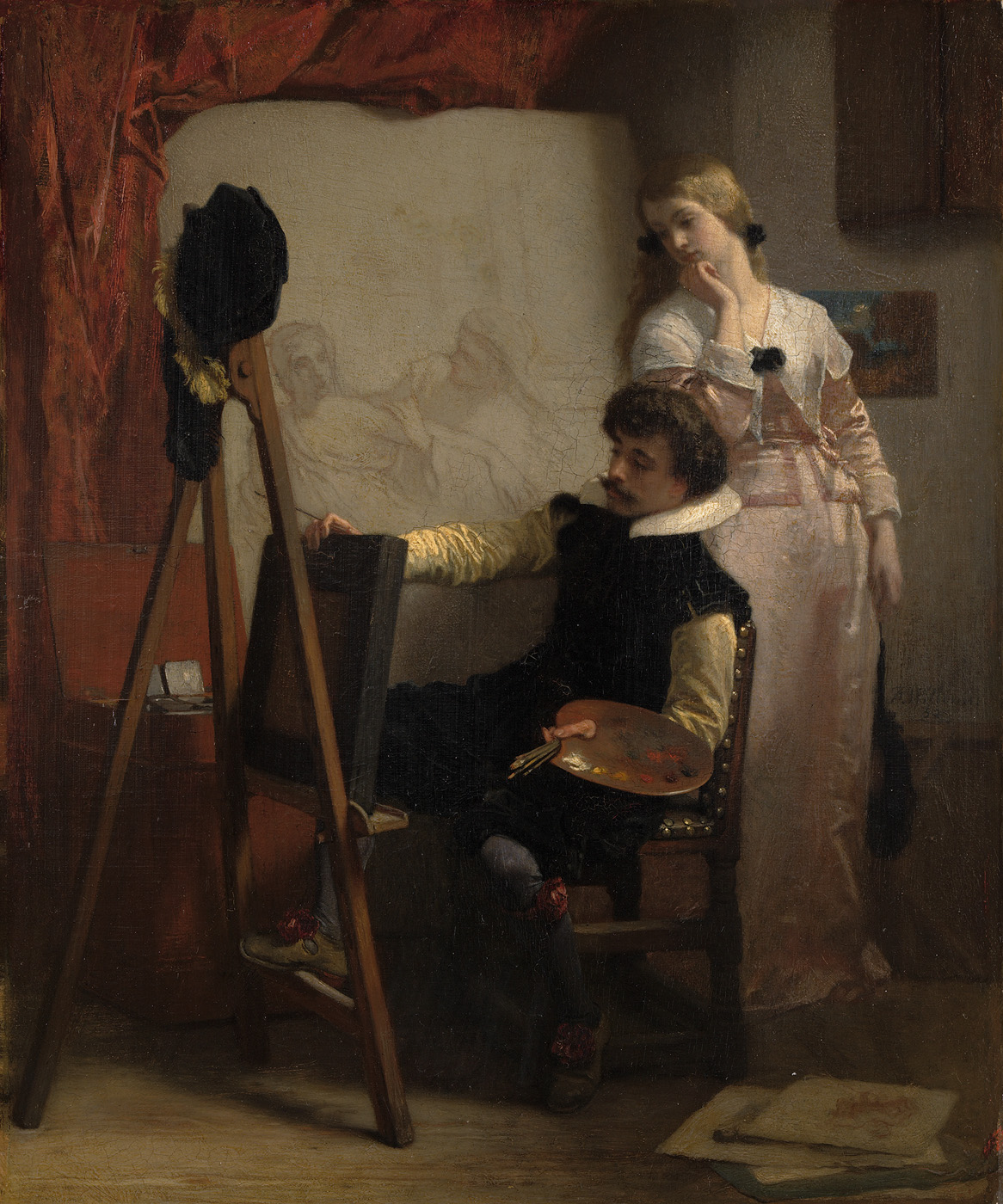
Painter at his easel shows his work to a girl (1852)

At the 1850 Brussels Salon he exhibited the historical work Public sale of paintings in 17th century Antwerp, for which he was granted the Chevalier cross in the Order of Leopold of Belgium. He was granted the rank of Chevalier of the French Legion of Honour for three paintings exhibited in the 1853 Paris Salon. Two of the three works that he exhibited at the Paris International Exhibition of 1855 were acquired by respectively French Emperor Napoleon III and the Empress. He was also awarded the rank of officer in the Order of Leopold of Belgium at that time. He died at Neuilly-sur-Seine.

== Work ==
Willems started to paint genre paintings at a time when the public was looking for an alternative to the prevailing Classicist and Romanticist schools of painting. It was a time when Dutch masters such as Jan Vermeer were being rediscovered. Willems' genre scenes depicting one or more figures in an interior executed in the style of the 17th century Dutch Baroque were therefore warmly received by contemporary critics. He also received commissions from the Belgian court to paint costume paintings set in the 17th century.

He was particularly praised for his ability to render realistically the materials worn by the figures, in particular silk and lace. His work has been criticized for depicting his figures in a lifeless manner, pale and emotionless, in contrast to Alfred Stevens' depictions of contemporary Parisian ladies, who are real people with flesh and blood.
