= The Bath (Stevens) =

Painting by Alfred Stevens

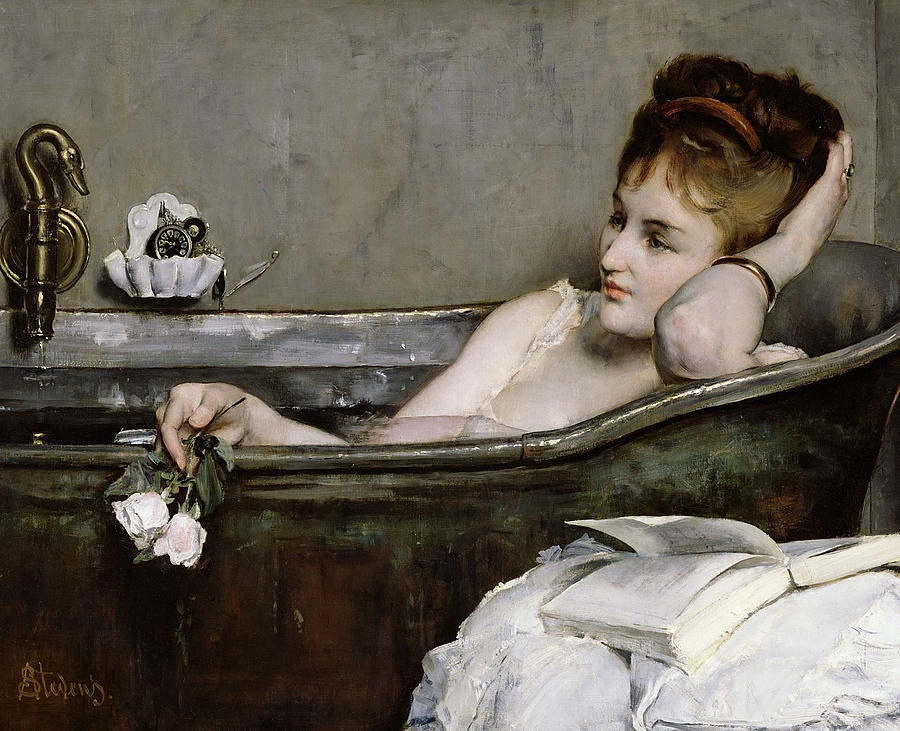
- Artist: Alfred Stevens
- Year: c. 1873
- Medium: Oil on canvas
- Dimensions: 73.5 cm × 92.8 cm (28.9 in × 36.5 in)
- Location: Musée d'Orsay; Paris

The Bath is an oil on canvas painting by Belgian painter Alfred Stevens. Apparently, two version of the paintings existed, one of which was reportedly destroyed in one of Vienna's fires. The painting was executed c. 1873–1874.

== Background ==
Stevens was trained as a painter in Brussels. He finished his studies in Paris and thereupon established himself there. During the Second Empire he pioneered and perfected the domestic interior scene, which the Impressionists later adopted. He was inspired by Pieter de Hooch and Vermeer, and painted both on wood panel and, as in the case of Le bain, on canvas.

Stevens made his name in Paris as a painter of beautifully dressed ladies. Unlike Franz Xaver Winterhalter, the official portraitist of the French imperial family, Stevens chose his models among the wealthy upper class ladies.

These demi-mondaines were maintained by their wealthy lovers, and passed their time reading books, making themselves up or at salons and exhibitions while waiting for their lovers to return. The model depicted in Le bain can also be seen in Stevens' Souvenirs and Regrets.

== Painting ==
The painting depicts an apathetic Parisian demi mondaine having a bath. Above the tub there are, fixed to the wall, a swan-shaped tap and a white fixture in the shape of a shell. Instead of holding a bath brush, the model holds two white roses in her right hand, which crosses her body and leans against the tub's side.

The rose may be viewed as a symbol of love and beauty, whereas the tap in the shape of a swan neck might refer to the classical myth of Leda and the swan, adding an erotic subtext to the painting.

== Sources ==
- Parijs-Brussel, Brussel-Parijs. Realisme, impressionisme, symbolisme, art nouveau. De artistieke dialoog tussen Frankrijk en België, 1848-1914, 1997, p. 172. ISBN 9789061533900
- "Alfred Stevens". Association of Historians of Nineteenth-Century Art.
