= Mary Magdalene (Stevens) =

Painting by Alfred Stevens

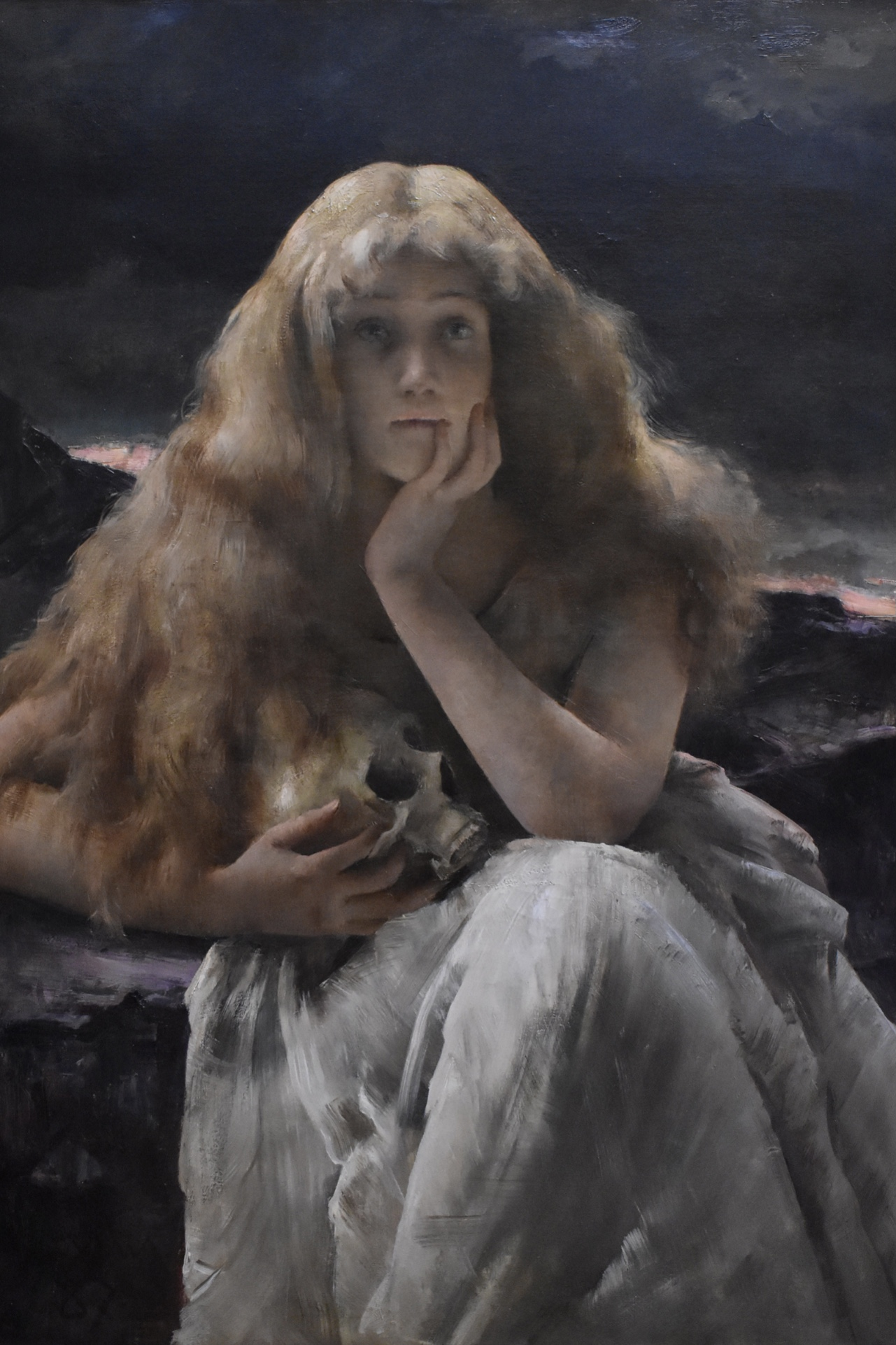
- Artist: Alfred Stevens
- Year: 1887
- Medium: Oil on canvas
- Dimensions: 111.8 cm × 77.3 cm (44 in × 30.4 in)
- Location: Museum of Fine Arts; Ghent

Mary Magdalene is an oil on canvas painting by Belgian painter Alfred Stevens. It is Stevens' revision of the Biblical figure of Mary Magdalene. The painting depicts Mary in the form of Sarah Bernhardt, an actress who often posed for portraits by Stevens. The work has been in the collection of the Museum of Fine Arts in Ghent since 2001.

The painting was ordered by the Parisian merchant Georges Petit.

== Painting ==
Alfred Stevens, painter of the mundane life in Paris, met the actress Sarah Bernhardt around 1887. He made several portraits of her. In some of them she posed as a character from history or literature. In this painting we see Bernhardt as Mary Magdalene, the gospel courtesan who later converted and retired as a recluse.

The long hair, the skull - the vanitas symbol par excellence - and the desolate landscape in the background are part of an iconographic tradition that goes back to the Middle Ages. Typical of the nineteenth century is the manifest sensuality and the melancholic, almost hallucinatory gaze wherewith Mary Magdalene looks at the viewer. This blurs the religious context of the character.

The challenging character of the work, yet completely in keeping with the figure of Mary Magdalene, shocked the general public who preferred to see her portrayed as the repentant penitent.

== Sources ==
- "Alfred Stevens Mary Magdalene". Museum of Fine Arts, Ghent.
- "Mary Magdalene". Flemish Art Collection. Archived from the original on 30 November 2020.
- "The Parisian Sphinx". KMSKA.
- Saskia de Bodt and others: Alfred Stevens. Brussels – Paris 1823-1906 . Royal Museums of Fine Arts of Belgium, Van Gogh Museum / Mercator Fund, 2009. ISBN 9789061538745
- Guido Kindt Sancta Erotica, How the Church Used Mary Magdalene . Van Halewyck, Leuven, 2002. ISBN 9056174525
