= King of the Forest =

1878 painting by Rosa Bonheur

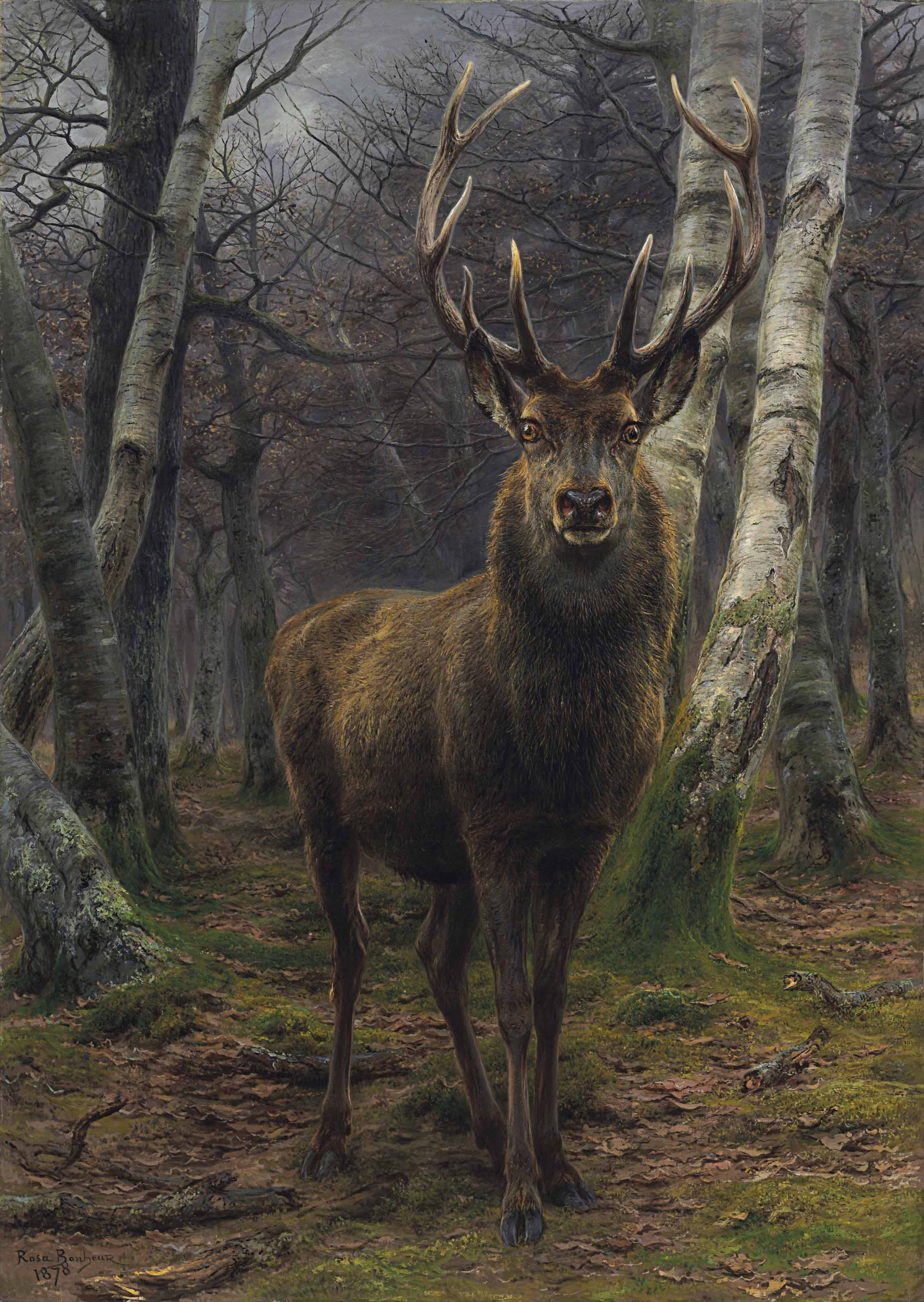
- Artist: Rosa Bonheur
- Year: 1878
- Medium: Oil on canvas
- Dimensions: 244.8 cm × 175 cm (96.4 in × 69 in)
- Location: Private collection

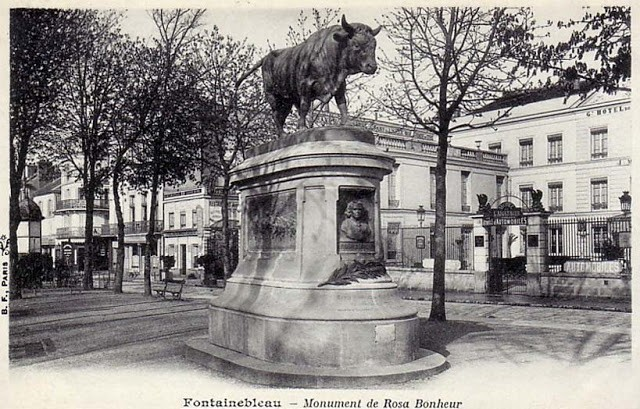
Destroyed monument to Rosa Bonheur in Fontainebleau

King of the Forest (French: Le Roi de la forêt) is an oil-on-canvas painting executed in 1878 by French artist Rosa Bonheur. The work measures 244.8 cm × 175 cm (96.4 in × 68.9 in). In the catalogue for an auction sale at Christie's in 2017, it was described as "Perhaps among the most important paintings by the renowned animalier Rosa Bonheur remaining in private hands" and "considered by the artist herself to be one of her masterpieces".

The naturalistic painting depicts a stag standing in a misty forest, looking directly at the viewer. It may be based on the artist's observations of wildlife near the Château de By, on the edge of the forest of Fontainebleau, as well as an animal that she kept in her own menagerie. It may also take inspiration from Edwin Landseer's 1851 painting The Monarch of the Glen

It was sold by Bonheur to Ernest Gambart in 1878. He displayed the painting at his home in Nice, and then exhibited it in Antwerp in 1879, in London in 1881, and at the World's Columbian Exposition in Chicago in 1893. Gambart had the painting reproduced as an engraving by Achille Isidore Gilbert in 1884.

After Gambart's death in 1902, it was sold in his estate sale at Christie's in London in May 1903. It passed through the hands of the art dealers Arthur Tooth & Sons in London and M. Knoedler & Co in New York, and was acquired by Charles M. Schwab in 1907. It was later acquired by Geraldine Rockefeller Dodge. After her death in 1973, it was sold at her estate sale at Sotheby's in New York in December 1975, and was acquired by the Westervelt Company. It was sold for US$607,500 at Christies in May 2017, and acquired for another private collection.

It was one of the three works – along with The Horse Fair and Ploughing in the Nivernais – cast in bronze as a bas relief by Isidore Bonheur on the plinth of a memorial to Bonehur erected in Fontainebleau (the memorial also included a cast of a bovine by Rosa Bonheur, but it was destroyed in 1941; casts of two of the reliefs from the plinth are preserved at the Dahesh Museum of Art in New York). Gambart had previously bought The Horse Fair, and had it engraved by Thomas Landseer.

The painting was exhibited at the Musée des Beaux-Arts de Bordeaux in 2022, and then at the Musée d'Orsay until January 2023.
