= Pyrenean Shepherd Offering Salt to his Sheep =

Painting by Rosa Bonheur

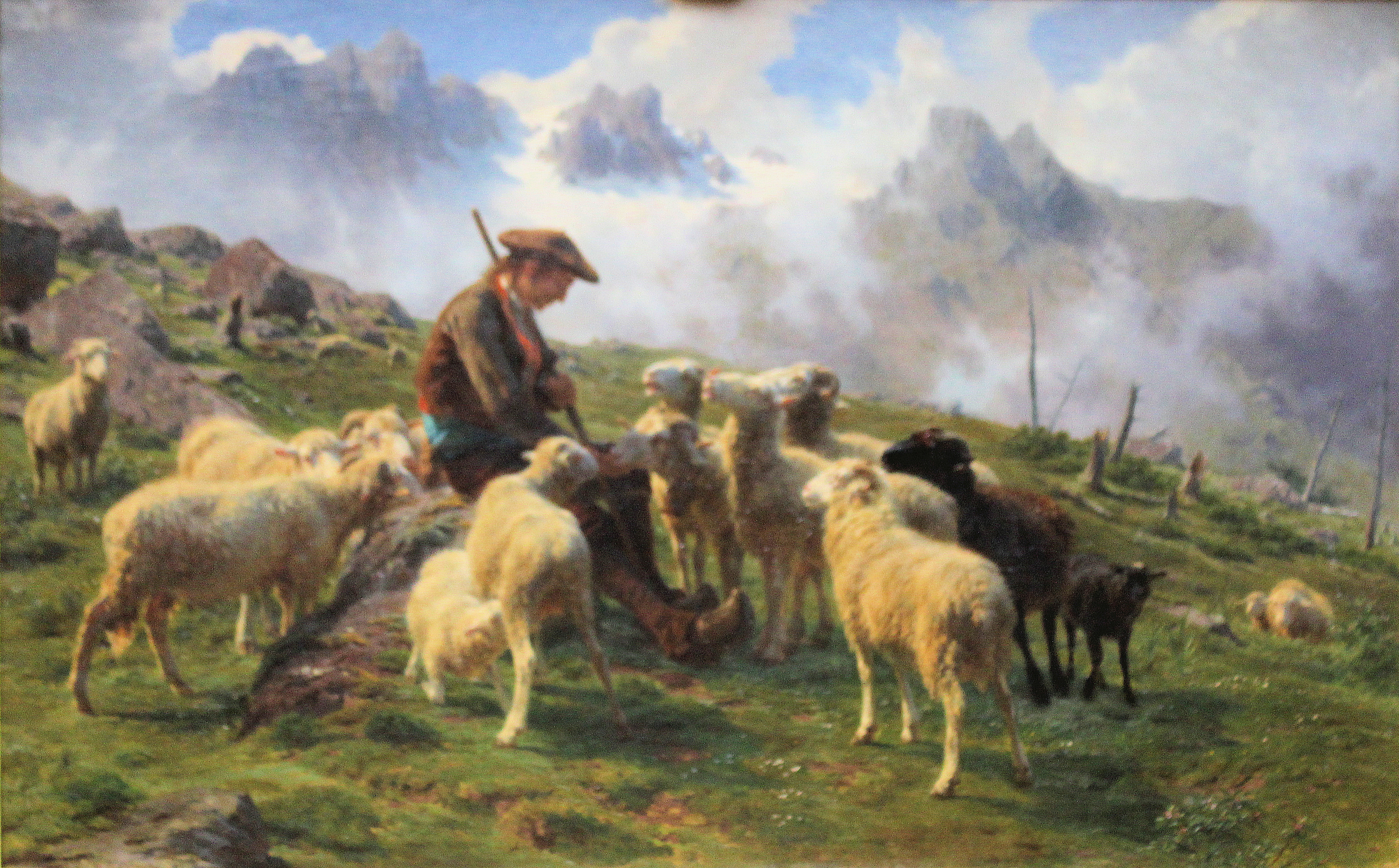
- Artist: Rosa Bonheur
- Year: 1864
- Medium: Oil on canvas
- Dimensions: 68 cm × 100 cm (27 in × 39 in)
- Location: Musée Condé, Chantilly

Pyrenean Shepherd Offering Salt to his Sheep is an oil-on-canvas painting by French artist Rosa Bonheur, executed in 1864. It his held at the Musée Condé, in Chantilly. The painting was commissioned by Henri d'Orléans, Duke of Aumale.

== History ==
Rosa Bonheur enjoyed great success at the Salon of 1853 with her painting The Horse Fair, then at the Universal Exhibition of 1855 with Haymaking in the Auvergne. Henri d'Orléans, then in exile in England, continued to follow artistic trends in France and commissioned a painting from the artist for his wife Princess Maria Carolina of Bourbon-Two Sicilies. For this, he went through the Countess of Ségur. The Duke receives the finished work on June 5, 1864, in larger than expected dimensions. The painting appealed to the Duke and Duchess so much that he decided to pay double the agreed price, the sum of 10,000 francs instead of 5,000.

The painting moved back to France when the Duke returned from exile in 1871, and was installed in the painting gallery of his Château de Chantilly, where it still hangs. The duke and the artist had the opportunity to meet afterwards during a dinner organized at the castle on April 22, 1894.

Rosa Bonheur traveled to the Pyrenees several times. She brought back many drawings from her excursions. The sheep represented in this painting are characteristic of the Basque-Béarnaise breed.
