= Woman at her Toilette =

Painting by Berthe Morisot

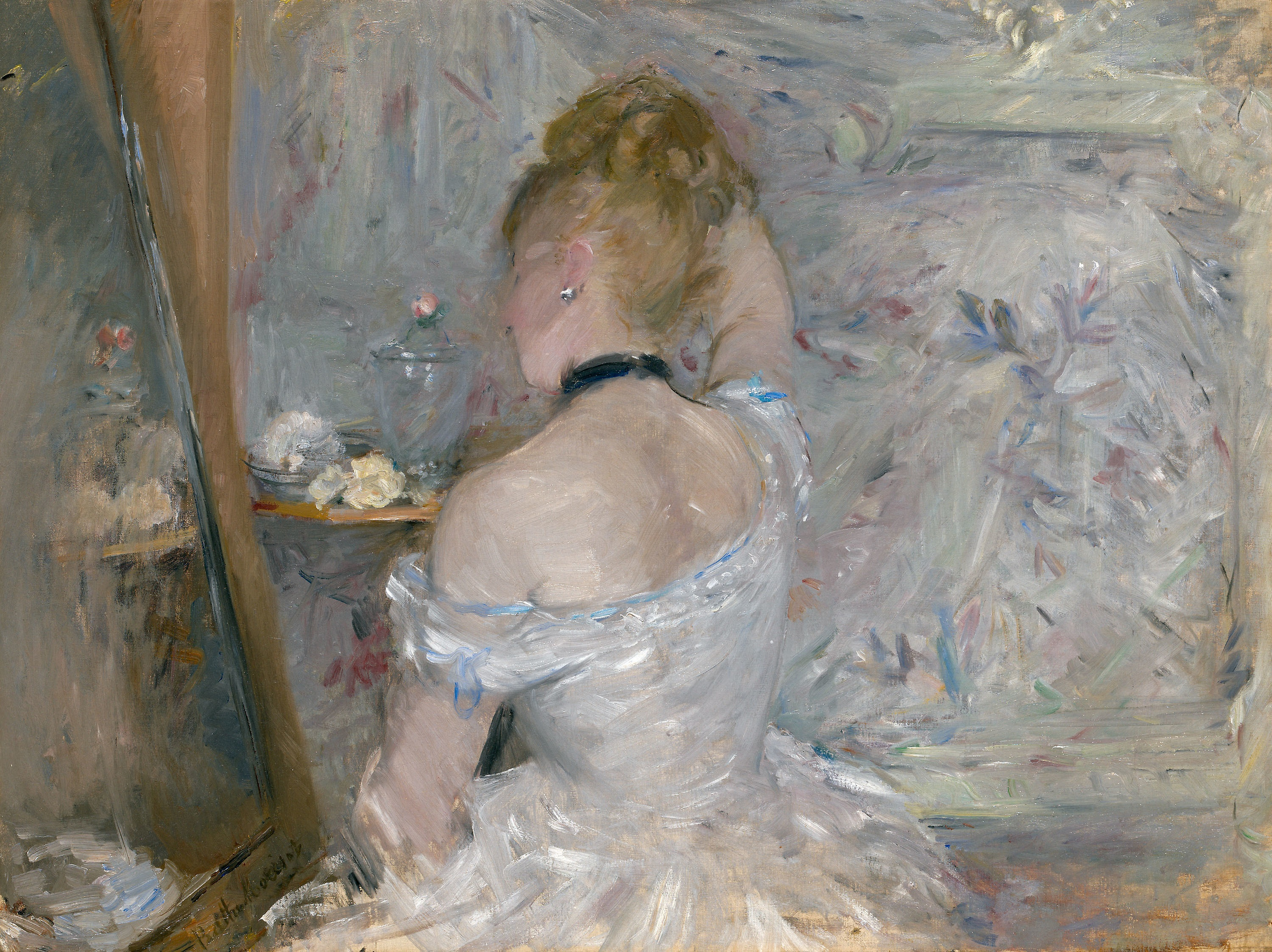
- Artist: Berthe Morisot
- Year: c. 1875–1880
- Medium: Oil on canvas
- Dimensions: 60.3 cm × 80.4 cm (23.7 in × 31.7 in)
- Location: Art Institute of Chicago, Chicago

Woman at her Toilette is an oil-on-canvas painting by French artist Berthe Morisot, executed between 1875 and 1880. It was first exhibited at the fifth Impressionist exhibition in 1880 and is now in the Art Institute of Chicago. When first shown, the work was displayed alongside other Impressionist works by Paul Cézanne, Pierre-Auguste Renoir, and Camille Pissarro. The painting is also known under the title Lady at her Toilet. The work is one of several paintings that Morisot completed on the theme of women getting dressed, applying makeup, and arranging their hair.

== Context ==
Woman at her Toilette and Morisot's other toilette scenes were based on everyday experiences she could witness as a bourgeois woman. In 1869, began to focus on depicting bourgeois women in their daily activities. Morisot has seven toilette paintings, and each one explores the dynamics of vision, whether through the inclusion of a mirror, a window, or other visual devices. According to the art historian Anne Higonnet, the toilette scenes displayed a woman's most vulnerable self, where a woman could "produce her self-image" and engage in a private ritual. Morisot's models generally do not acknowledge or see the viewer, emphasizing the sense of privacy. Because female artists often had restricted access to models, Morisot relied on many of her female friends to pose for her works.

Morisot's status as a female artist meant that she faced many obstacles and prejudices when presenting her works. As Morisot was both a wife and mother, unlike other female artists such as Mary Cassatt and Rosa Bonjeur, she experienced particular difficulties in balancing professional ambitions with domestic responsibilities. Critic Théodore Duret claimed that her gender and social class both contributed to a diminished reputation for Morisot.

== Description ==
Woman at her Toilette shows a woman in front of a mirror in her bathroom, facing away from the viewer. The piece contains a silvery-gray and white palette with subtle hints of blue. Like many of her paintings from the preceding years, the work has elements of the Rococo style. Facets of Rococo are seen in the pastel and dreamlike palette, loose brushwork, blurred edges, and feminine qualities. The emphasis on color instead of structure was seen as a feminine quality in works, and Morisot took inspiration from the sketches by Jean-Honoré Fragonard to embody characteristics of the Rococo style. The loose brushwork and sketchiness of the piece, Kathleen Adler argues, may be due to Morisot's freedom of having a stable career where she did not have to rely solely on dealers to sell her work.

== Analysis ==
The art historians Kathleen Adler and Tamar Garb argue that the painting is "in keeping with contemporary constructions of womanhood" because the toilette was where women transformed themselves into "appealing objects of male delectation."

Anne Higonnet asserts, however, that the bathroom setting conveys a moment of creativity for women and is an invitation for viewers to come in and view this vulnerable scene. She explains that Morisot examined how women's bodies were objectified in society, and instead of fueling this gender dynamic, she "turned eroticism into an empty spectacle by refusing to provide the sexual content a viewer would expect." Although it seems Morisot is allowing a masculine desire into her pieces, all women in the bathroom scenes are preoccupied with themselves, and instead "turn us away" from them. Some might believe Morisot's piece to be entirely erotic, yet Higonnet explains that the pieces "contain as many denials of a sexually possessive gaze as solicitations." In addition, the many elements of vision make viewers think about how women are perceived in society and how these women see and alter themselves for the public eye.

Art historian Cindy Kang observes that even though many of Morisot's feminine images have aspects of sensuality, art critics at the time did not perceive her artwork to be erotic. While the toilette scenes could convey eroticism through "the contours of the lithe bodies and passages of exposed skin," these undertones were counterbalanced by Morisot's "gestural brushstrokes," which placed a greater emphasis on the psychological state of her subjects. With this, Morisot introduced a "feminine vision" where she could "complicate or disrupt the traditional narratives of femininity that began in the rococo period" and continued throughout the time.

== Critics ==
Morisot's most critically successful pieces were The Mirror (La Psyché), Head of a Girl (Woman with a Fan) and Woman at her Toilette. With her toilette scenes, Joris-Karl Huysmans wrote that Morisot was "the chronicler of the boudoir." Many critics saw the silvery-blue palette in Woman at her Toilette as evidence of Morisot's attention to natural light.

Kang explains that while Éduoard Manet and Edgar Degas painted bathing scenes that were "immediately associated in the press with women of easy virtue and prostitution, the women in Morisot's boudoir paintings, such as Getting Up, The Mirror, and Woman at her Toilette, were viewed as 'charming,' 'virginal,' 'chaste,' and exuding a 'fashionable elegance.'"

== Provenance ==
Art collector Ernest Hoschedé bought Woman at her Toilette in January of 1876 from one of Morisot's dealers, Paul Durand-Ruel. Hoshedé was a patron of both Manet and Morisot. He also purchased her painting Young Woman with a Mirror or Interior. In June of 1878, Mary Cassatt bought Woman at her Toilette from Hoschedé's collection for 95 francs.
