= Nathalie Micas =

French painter, inventor (1824–1889)

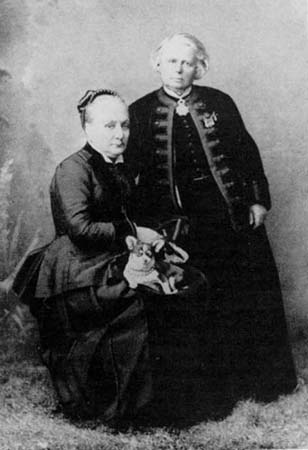
- Micas (left) and Bonheur (right), 1882
- Born: 24 April 1824; Paris, France
- Died: 21 June 1889 (aged 65); Thomery
- Burial place: Père Lachaise Cemetery, Paris
- Occupations: Painter, inventor

Jeanne Sarah Nathalie Micas (24 April 1824 – 21 June 1889) was a French painter and inventor of an efficient brake for trains. She lived with artist Rosa Bonheur for 40 years.

== Biography ==
Jeanne Sarah Nathalie Micas was born in Paris, the daughter of Louis Frédéric Micas, typographer, and Henriette Briolles.

In 1836, at the age of 12, she met Rosa Bonheur, aged 14. Bonheur's father painted Micas's portrait in 1837, and the two girls "became immediately close, soon deciding to spend their lives together." Like Bonheur, Micas obtained a cross-dressing permit giving her official authorization to wear trousers. Since an order dating from November 1800, all women of the time were required to request this permission, renewable every six months, from the Paris prefecture, to wear trousers so they could move around the places where they worked.

In 1850, she and Bonheur went to the Pyrenees.

Micas exhibited at the Paris Salon of 1852 and 1865. To allow the engraving of the Horse Market desired by Ernest Gambart, she painted a smaller version of the very large painting, which was finished by Rosa Bonheur and engraved by British artist Thomas Landseer. The Musée des Beaux-Arts de Bordeaux and the National Gallery, London, list Bonheur and Micas as co-creators of the piece, which hangs in the Metropolitan Museum of Art in New York.

In 1860, Micas settled with her mother, Bonheur and many animals at the Château de By, in Thomery.

== Invention ==
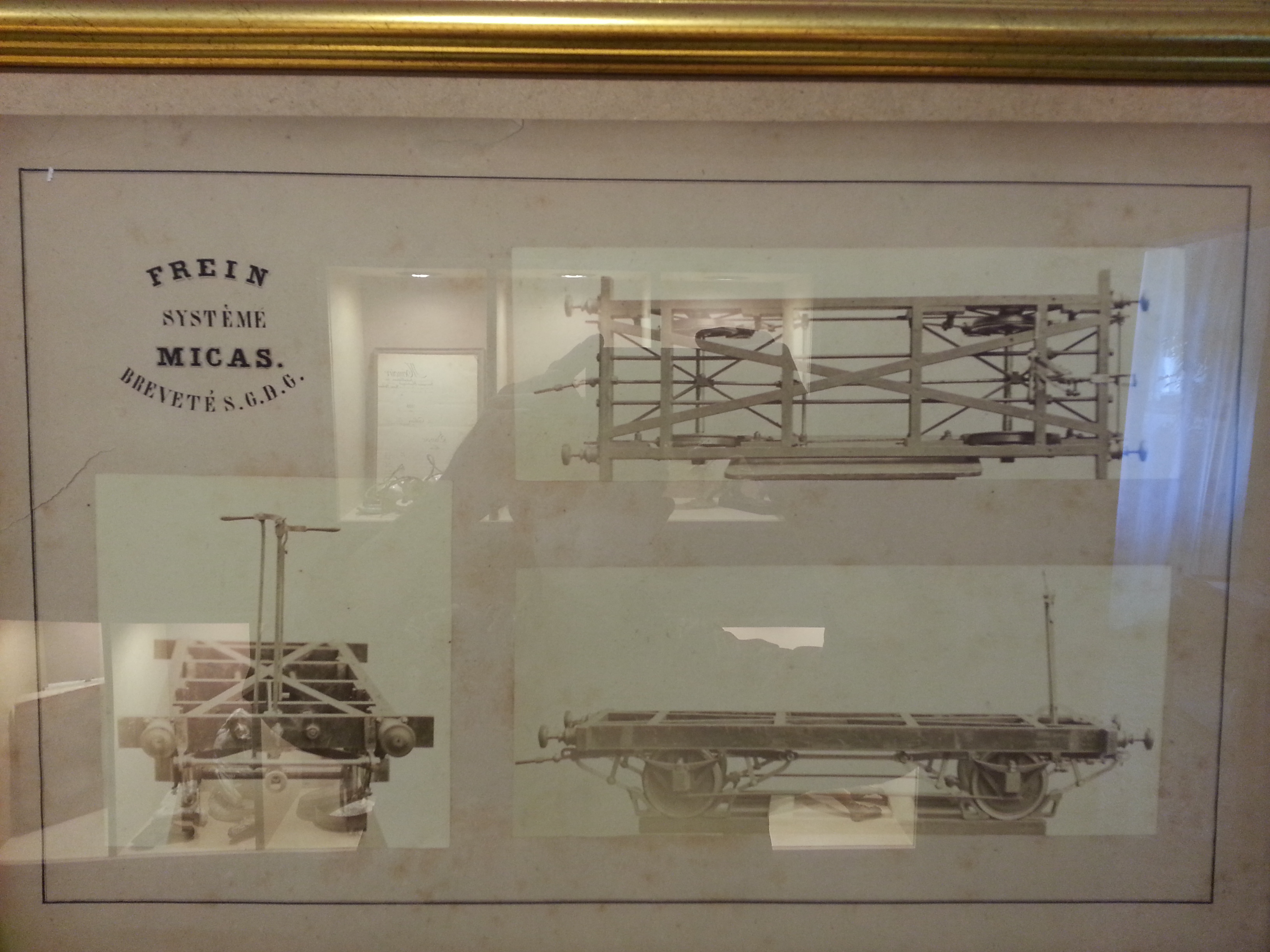
The braking system developed by Nathalie Micas was tested at the Château de By in Thomery in 1861 and patented in 1862.

Micas invented a more efficient braking system for trains, which she tested using a railway track she had constructed in 1861 in the park of the Château de By. This system became the subject of a patent application for the "Micas brake" in 1862.

== Personal life ==
Micas lived with Bonheur for 40 years until her death in 1889. Of the relationship between the two women, Bonheur wrote: "Had I been a man I would have married her.... I would have had a family, with my children as heirs, and nobody would have had any right to complain."

She died at the Château de By in Thomery (Seine-et-Marne) on 21 June 1889. The painter Charles Bourdon, her friend, was a witness to the death for the civil registry. She was buried on 24 June at the Père Lachaise Cemetery in Paris with Rosa Bonheur and Bonheur's biographer Anna Elizabeth Klumpke. Their combined tomb reads, "Friendship is divine affection."
