= Haymaking (disambiguation) =

Haymaking is the process of hay production and harvest.

Haymaking may also refer to:

== Paintings ==
- Haymaking (Bastien-Lepage), by Jules Bastien-Lepage, 1877
- Haymaking (Bruegel), or The Hay Harvest, by Pieter Bruegel the Elder, 1565
- Haymaking, by Henry George Hine
- Haymaking, by Peter Paul Marshall, 1860
- Haymaking, by Sergei Osipov, 1964
- Haymaking (Arkady Plastov), by Arkady Plastov at the New Tretyakov Gallery (Moscow), 1945

== Other uses ==
- "Haymaking" (Teletubbies), a 1997 television episode
- "Haymaking", a poem by John Clare
- "Haymaking", a poem by Apollon Maykov
- Haymaking, a Thoroughbred racehorse; winner of the 1966 Nassau Stakes, 1966 Coronation Stakes, and 1967 Select Stakes

== See also ==
- Haymakers, a 1785 painting by George Stubbs
- Haymaking in the Auvergne, an 1855 painting by Rosa Bonheur
