= Rosa Bonheur (Anna Elizabeth Klumpke) =

1898 painting by Anna Elizabeth Klumpke

- Portrait of Rosa Bonheur
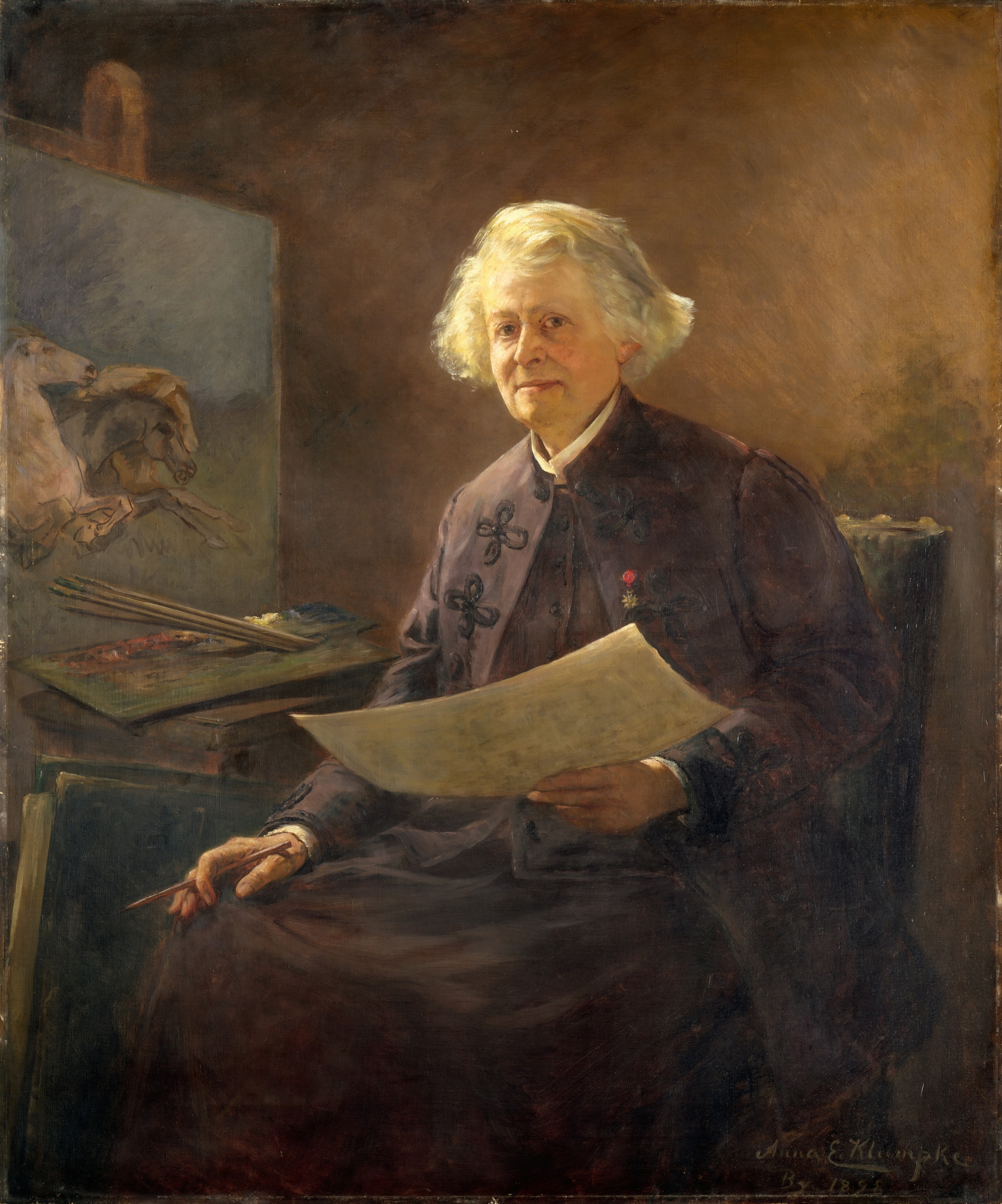
- Artist: Anna Elizabeth Klumpke
- Year: 1898
- Medium: oil paint, canvas
- Dimensions: 117.2 cm (46.1 in) × 98.1 cm (38.6 in)
- Accession: 22.222

Rosa Bonheur is an 1898 painting by Anna Elizabeth Klumpke. The portrait of the French artist Rosa Bonheur has been in the collection of the Metropolitan Museum of Art since 1922.

== Early history and creation ==
Bonheur was an artist whom Klumpke "had long admired." The two artists had been corresponding for some time prior to 1898. Klumpke was persuaded by a conversation with members of the Douglas Miller family to ask to paint Bonheur. On September 14, 1897, Klumpke wrote to Bonheur, asking if she might paint her portrait. On March 31, 1898, Bonheur responded, "I am at your disposal, dear mademoiselle, for the portrait."

Kumpke started work on the oil on canvas portrait in June 1898. Klumpke wrote that she "was delighted that Rosa Bonheur had offered of her own accord to pose in women's clothes." Bonheur would not pose for Klumpke every day, saying that she "can't stand long sittings." During the times she posed for Klumpke, the two artists talked about art and literature, told stories, and discussed religion and morality. Klumpke's work on the painting was also dictated by Bonheur, who wanted the younger artist to follow her suggestions about sketching and artwork. Maria Tamboukou writes that the interplay of conversation and sittings for the creation of the painting show Bonheur to be "a woman in love" with Klumpke.

== Description and interpretation ==
The work depicts French painter Rosa Bonheur. Klumpke was also a biographer for Bonheur's life and work. Bonheur is depicted sitting at her easel and wearing her medal of the Legion of Honor. Bonheur is wearing a long frogged coat and a stiff white collar. In her hand is a drawing and on the easel is the beginning of a painting of three horses. The expression of Bonheur's face "hovers between the pensive and the provocative," according to Britta C. Dwyer.

Klumpke remained with Bonheur in France as her companion. On Bonheur's death in 1899, the year after the portrait was completed, Klumpke inherited Bonheur's home and studio at the Château de By near Fontainebleau. The painting was owned by Klumpke and her sister and agent, Dorothea Roberts, until 1922. In that year, Klumpke gifted the work to the Met.
