= Anna Elizabeth Klumpke =

American painter (1856–1942)

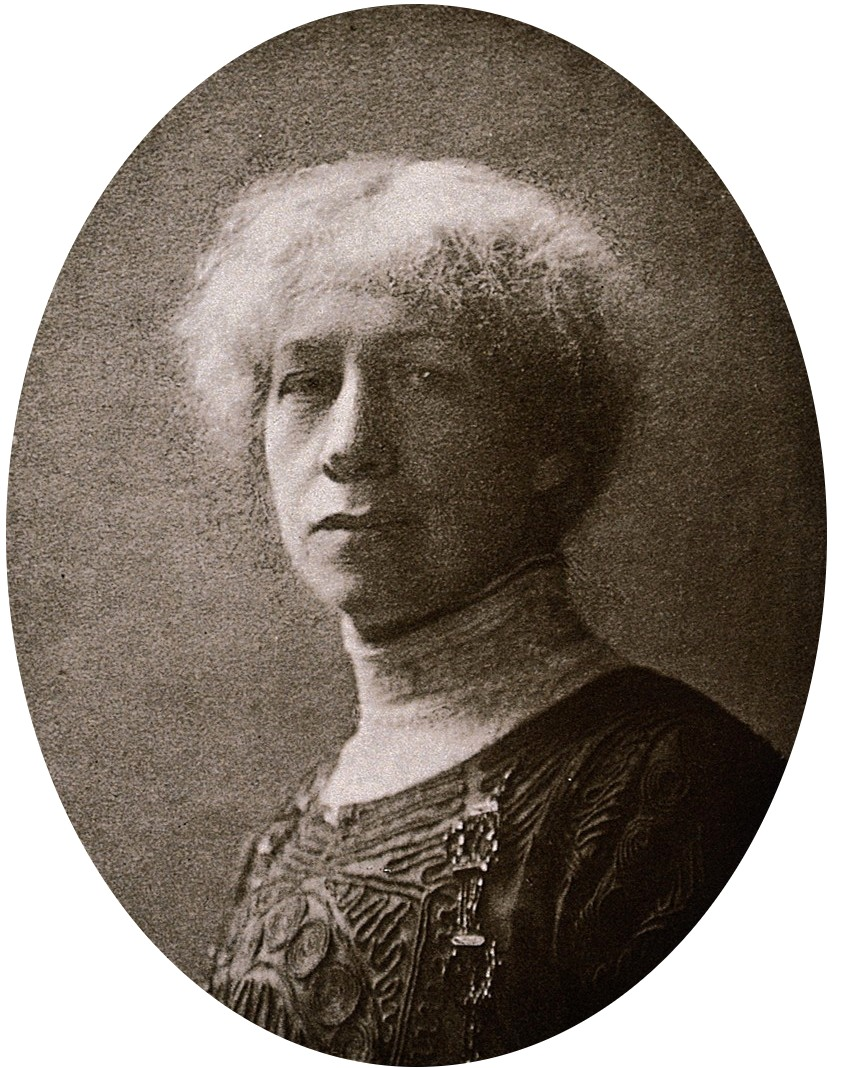
- Born: October 28, 1856; San Francisco, California, U.S.
- Died: February 9, 1942 (aged 85); San Francisco, California, U.S.
- Resting place: Père Lachaise Cemetery (Paris, France), San Francisco Columbarium & Funeral Home (San Francisco, California)
- Known for: Genre works, painting

Anna Elizabeth Klumpke (October 28, 1856 – February 9, 1942) was an American portrait and genre painter born in San Francisco, California, United States. She is perhaps best known for her portraits of famous women including Elizabeth Cady Stanton (1889) and Rosa Bonheur (1898).

== Early life and education ==
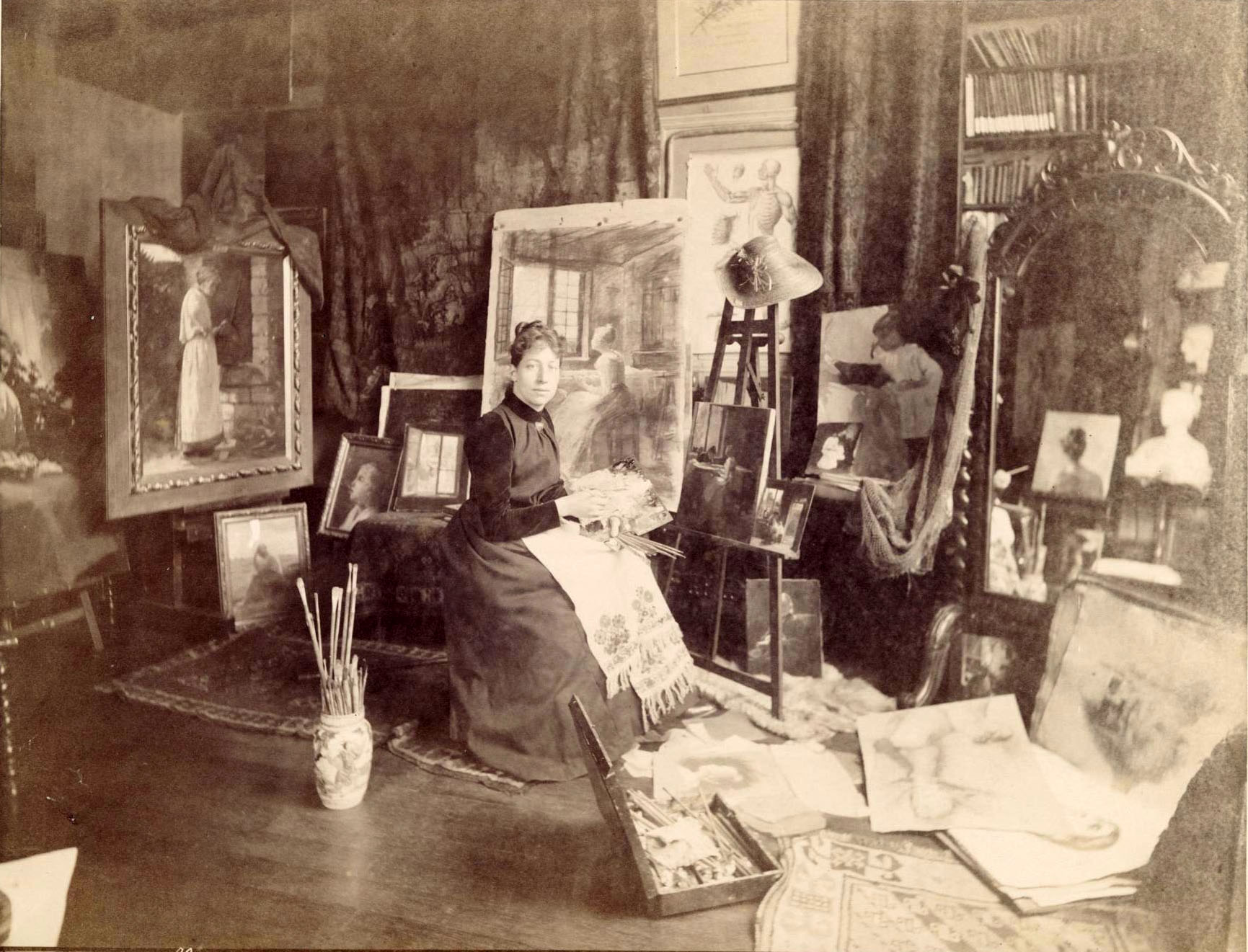
Klumpke in her studio in the late 1880s

Klumpke's father, Johann Gerhard Klümpke, born in Nortrup Lower Saxony, Germany , was a successful and wealthy realtor in San Francisco. Her mother was Dorothea Mattilda Tolle. Klumpke was the eldest of eight children, five of whom lived to maturity. Among her siblings were the astronomer Dorothea Klumpke-Roberts, the violinist Julia Klumpke, and the neurologist Augusta Déjerine-Klumpke.

At age three, she fell and suffered a fracture of her femur. She fell again at age five and suffered osteomyelitis with purulent knee arthritis. These problems left her with a disability, and her mother went to extraordinary lengths to find a remedy by taking Klumpke and three of her siblings to Berlin for treatment by Dr. Bernhard von Langenbeck. The treatment lasted 18 months and included thermal baths at Kreuznach. It was unsuccessful, however, and Klumpke had difficulty walking for the rest of her life. While they were in Europe, her mother ensured that her children received excellent tutoring. The time away in Europe strained the Klumpkes' relationship. When Anna was fifteen, her parents divorced. She and her siblings (now numbering five) moved with their mother to Göttingen, Germany, where they lived for a time with Mattilda's sister, who had married a German national. Klumpke and her sister Augusta were sent to school at Cannstatt, near Stuttgart. When she was seventeen, the family moved to Clarens, near Lake Geneva in Switzerland, where she spent two years at a boarding school.

Klumpke studied art at home for the next few years and, in October 1877, moved with her family once more to Paris, where she was later enrolled in the Académie Julian (1883–1884), under the tutelage of Tony Robert-Fleury and Jules Lefebvre. She spent many an hour copying paintings in the Musée du Luxembourg, including Rosa Bonheur's Ploughing in the Nivernais. She presented her first work at the Paris Salon in 1884 while still at the Academy and won the grand prize for outstanding student of the year. She exhibited regularly at the Salon for several more years.

After completing her studies, she returned to the United States, where she taught in Boston for a few years. In 1889, she returned to Paris.

== Career ==
As a girl, Klumpke had been given a "Rosa" doll, styled after the French animal painter Rosa Bonheur. From early childhood, she was fascinated and inspired by Bonheur. In 1895, the two women met, Bonheur at age 73 and Klumpke at age 39. Klumpke was intent on painting Bonheur's portrait.

By August 11, 1898, the two women were living together and had signed a contract; Bonheur created a new art studio for Klumpke, and in exchange, Klumpke would paint three portraits of Bonheur and write her biography. Their relationship endured until Bonheur's death in May 1899.

Klumpke was named the sole heir to Bonheur's estate, against the family's desire. In 1899, she opened the Rosa Bonheur Memorial Art School, providing art education for women. She oversaw the sale of Bonheur's collected works in 1900. She founded the Rosa Bonheur Prize at the Société des Artistes Français and organized the Musée de l'atelier Rosa Bonheur (Museum of the Studio of Rosa Bonheur) at Château de By near the Palace of Fontainebleau.

Klumpke was a meticulous diarist; in 1908, she published a biography of Bonheur, Sa Vie Son Oeuvre, meaning Her Life, Her Work. The biography was based on her own diary and Bonheur's letters, sketches, and other writings. In the book, which was not published in English until 1998, Klumpke told the story of Bonheur's life and related how she had met Bonheur, how they had fallen in love, and how she had become the artist's official portraitist and companion.

During World War I, she established a military convalescent hospital at her home in Thomery with her mother.

Klumpke exhibited her work at the Palace of Fine Arts and The Woman's Building at the 1893 World's Columbian Exposition in Chicago, Illinois.

Following Bonheur's death, Klumpke divided her time between France, Boston, and San Francisco, finally settling in San Francisco in the 1930s with her widowed younger sister, astronomer Dorothea Klumpke.

In 1940, at the age of 84, Klumpke published her autobiography, Memoirs of an Artist. She died on February 9, 1942, at the age of 85 years, in her native San Francisco. A memorial to her is at Neptune Society Columbarium, San Francisco, and she is buried alongside Rosa Bonheur and Nathalie Micas at Père Lachaise Cemetery, Paris. Their collective tomb reads, "Friendship is divine affection".

=== Style ===
Anna Klumpke was primarily a genre painter, often painting pastoral scenes featuring static figures, usually female. Her painting, Catinou Knitting, was exhibited at the Paris Salon in 1887. This sentimental image proved highly popular in reproduction and is still sold in hand-painted copies. She also painted portraits, many of which were of women.

== Awards, honors and legacy ==
- 1885 – Honorable mention, Paris Salon
- 1888 – First prize, Académie Julian, Paris, France
- 1889 – Temple Gold Medal, for the painting In the Wash-House, Pennsylvania Academy of the Fine Arts. She was the first woman ever to receive this award.
- 1919 – Silver medal (médaille d'argent de la Reconnaissance française), Medal of French Gratitude (La Reconnaissance Française), awarded by Anna and her mother by the government of France in relation to her sister Augusta and her brother in law Jules' contributions to France during WWI.
- 1924 – Chevalier of the Légion d'honneur, France
- 1936 – Officier of the Légion d'honneur, awarded for her eight years of membership, France

Klumpke was included in the 2018 exhibit Women in Paris 1850–1900.

== Bibliography ==
=== Autobiography ===
- Klumpke, Anne Elizabeth (1940). Memoirs of an Artist. Lilian Whiting (editor). Boston, Mass.: Wright & Potter Printing Company.

=== Other publications by Klumpke ===
- Klumpke, Anna (1908). Rosa Bonheur: Sa Vie Son Oeuvre. Flammarion, Ernest Flammarion Editeur.: The first edition of this book was leather-bound and illustrated with seven heliogravure plates, 200 photographic plates of Bonheur's paintings and bound by the Hicks-Judd Bindery of San Francisco

== Notable works ==
| Work | Image | Year | Format | Owner | Notes |
|---|---|---|---|---|---|
| Catinou Knitting | | 1880 | oil | Estelle G. (Mrs Charles W.) Livingston, Kensington, California | |
| Seated Woman with a Red Kerchief | | 1886 | | | Auctioned at Bonhams, New York City, 21 May 2008, Lot 1056 |
| In the Wash-house | | 1888 | oil on canvas painting laid to wood | Pennsylvania Academy of the Fine Arts, Philadelphia, Pennsylvania | Exhibited at Paris Salon of 1888; Winner of PAFA's 1889 Temple Gold Medal (first woman awarded the medal) |
| Elizabeth Cady Stanton | | 1889 | oil on canvas | National Portrait Gallery, Washington, D.C. | |
| Girl with Cat | | 1890 | pastel | Joy L. Barker, Novato, California | |
| Child with a Doll | | 1891 | pastel | Longfellow National Historic Site, Cambridge, Massachusetts | Administered by United States Department of the Interior, National Park Service, Washington, D.C. |
| A Moment's Rest, Barbizon | | 1891 | pastel on paper, mounted on canvas | | Auctioned at Heritage Auctions, Dallas, Texas, 14 September 2014, Lot 65725 |
| Girl in a Field | | 1893 | pastel | | Auctioned at Sotheby Parke Bernet, New York City |
| Portrait of Miss Mary Sophia Walker | | 1895 | oil on canvas | Bowdoin College Museum of Art, Bowdoin, Maine | |
| Portrait of Rosa Bonheur | | 1898 | pastel on paper | Bowdoin College Museum of Art, Bowdoin, Maine | |
| Rosa Bonheur | | 1898 | oil on canvas | Metropolitan Museum of Art, New York City | |
| Among the Lilies | | 1909 | oil on canvas | Palace of the Legion of Honor, Fine Arts Museums of San Francisco, San Francisco, California | |
| Portrait of the Violinist Goby Eberhardt | | 1911 | painting | Museen für Kunst und Kulturgeschichte der Hansestadt Lübeck, Behnhaus Museum, Lubeck, Germany | |
| The Artist's Father | | 1912 | oil on canvas | M. H. de Young Memorial Museum, Fine Arts Museums of San Francisco, San Francisco, California | |
