= Weaning the Calves =

Painting by Rosa Bonheur

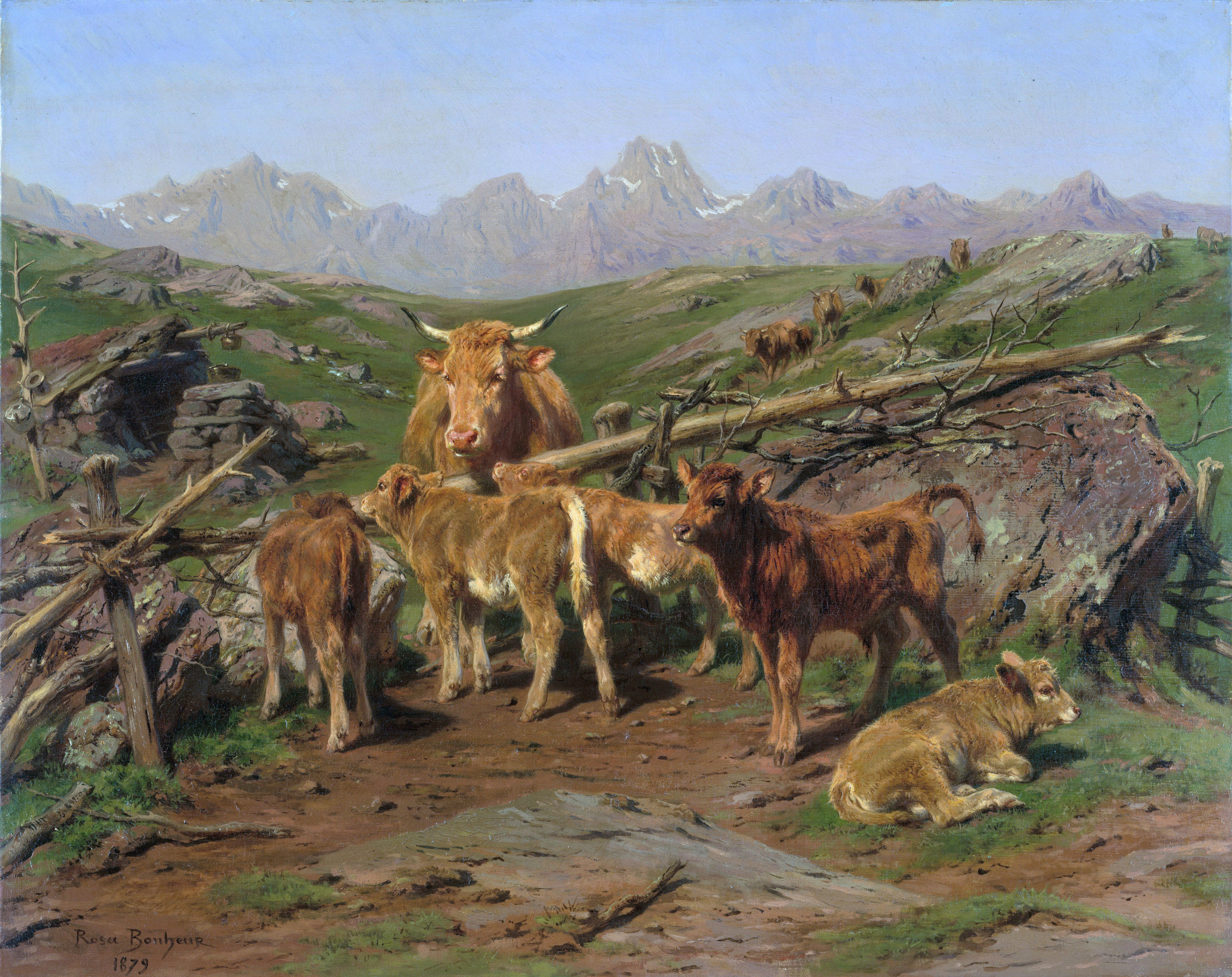
- Artist: Rosa Bonheur
- Year: 1879
- Medium: Oil on canvas
- Dimensions: 65.1 cm × 81.3 cm (25.6 in × 32.0 in)
- Location: Metropolitan Museum of Art, New York

Weaning the Calves is an oil-on-canvas painting by the French artist Rosa Bonheur, painted in 1879. It is held at the Metropolitan Museum of Art, in New York.

== Description ==
The painting was probably inspired by the artist's trip to the Pyrenees, where she did several studies in 1850, or to the United Kingdom. It depicts a pasture where a cow looks upon five calves, who are separated from her by an artificial barrier made of wood, stone and debris. The painting is a metaphor for the process of emancipation of the calves through their weaning, which despite being initially difficult becomes strengthening. The scene of the foreground opens to other pasturelands, where a small structure is depicted to the left, and five adult cows are seen to the right. The mountains which serve as the background for the painting are majestic and in accordance with the romantic mentality.
