= Rosa Bonheur Memorial Park =

Pet Cemetery in Elkridge, MD

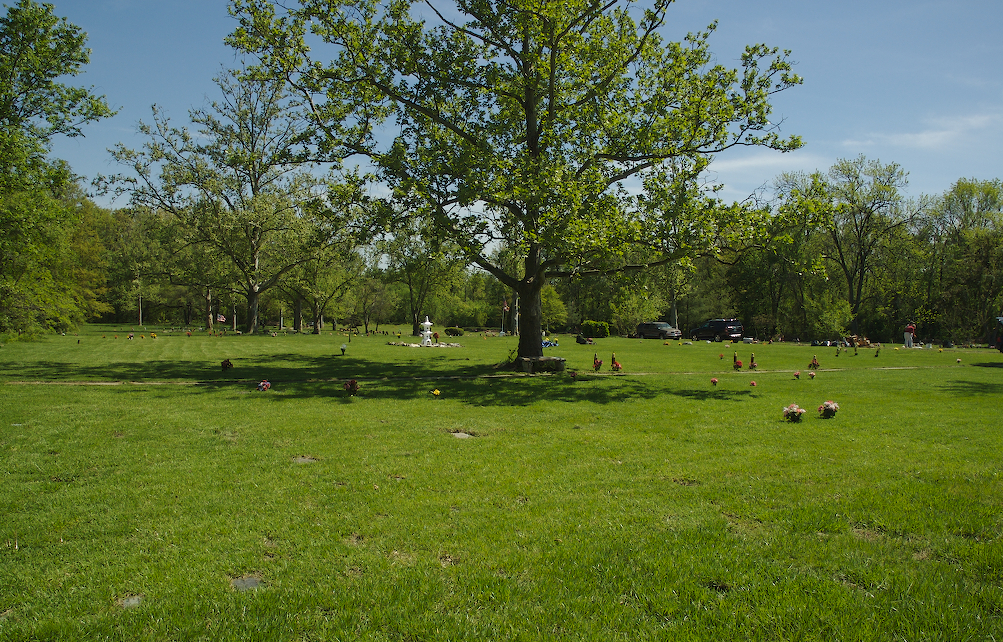
- Rosa Bonheur Memorial Park
- Interactive map of Rosa Bonheur Memorial Park

Details
- Established: 1935
- Location: Elkridge, Maryland
- Country: United States
- Coordinates: 39°11′5.3″N 76°45′36.9″W
- Type: Pet and Human (closed)
- Owned by: William Anthony Green (1978–1997), Jerry Rosenbaum
- No. of graves: 8000

Rosa Bonheur Memorial Park is a pet cemetery located in Elkridge, Maryland, USA. The cemetery was established in 1935, and was actively operated until 2002. Approximately 8,000 animals and humans are buried in the cemetery's 11 1/2 acres, which is large enough to accommodate about 24,000 pets.

The cemetery is named for Rosa Bonheur (1822–1899), a French painter and sculptor noted for her paintings of animals.

The Rosa Bonheur Memorial Park made national headlines in 1979 when it became the first pet cemetery in the world to allow humans to be buried alongside their pets. There are at least 28 humans, and perhaps as many as 100, buried at the cemetery. A tomb of unknown pets was established in 1991.

In 1978 the Cemetery was inherited by land developer William Anthony Green. In 1997, the owner William Anthony Green was charged for charging owners for non delivered headstones, misdelivery and abuse of remains with Commercial and Farmers Bank of Ellicott City foreclosing. By 2006, the cemetery was no longer accepting pet or human burials. The grounds of the Rosa Bonheur Memorial Park are currently being maintained by local volunteers. In 2013 former Howard County Planning and Zoning director Joseph W. Rutter and Donald R. Reuwer Jr proposed redeveloping 6 acres of the cemetery for a 21acre total mixed use development of commercial buildings and residential construction, moving pet graves as needed. The properties were approved to be combined for higher density development during the comprehensive zoning process of 2013.

Noted animals buried at Rosa Bonheur Memorial Park include:

- Gypsy Queen. In 1925, World War I veteran Frank Heath and his horse Gypsy Queen began a journey across the United States, with the goal of visiting all 48 states. They completed the trip more than two years later, returning to their starting point in Washington, D.C. in 1927. In all, the pair covered 11,356 miles, making it the longest trail ever covered by one horse under saddle. Gypsy Queen died in 1936, and a bronze tablet was erected in her honor at the Rosa Bonheur Memorial Park in 1938. Gypsy Queen also has a burial plot at the cemetery.
- Mary Ann. Mary Ann was the first elephant at the Baltimore Zoo. She was brought to Baltimore from India in 1922, and was especially popular with children. Mary Ann died in 1942 after falling over in her sleep and injuring her spine. She was buried at the cemetery after her death.
- Corporal Rex Ahlbin. Rex Ahlbin was a combat dog who served with the US Marine Corps during World War II. Rex served with the US 3rd Marine Division during the Battle of Empress Augusta Bay at Bougainville Island in 1943. Rex, a two-year-old Doberman, warned of the presence of Japanese soldiers near a Marine position, enabling Marines to fend off a later attack. Rex also served with the Marine Corps during the Guadalcanal campaign and at the Battle of Tinian. For his service, Rex was promoted to the rank of corporal by the Marine Corps in 1944. Rex is buried near the center of the cemetery, with a marker noting his service to his country.
- Washington Bullets mascots. Several mascots for the Washington Bullets basketball team are buried at the cemetery: "Tiny BB" (1966–1987), Alex "The Bullet" (1957–1975), and "Buckshot" (1964–1967).
- Little Van Atta (1947–1955), an underground courier dog born in France, who is said to have brought the news of D-Day to her native city with a message hidden in her collar.
- Pretty Boy Boyer (1954–1956), a parakeet with a vocabulary of 1000 words. His headstone is inscribed "Bye, Bye, Mommy, see you later", which is what he always said when his owner left the room.
- Carlo (1939–1966), a dog. At age 27, he was, according to his burial marker, "one of the oldest authenticated dogs in the country".
- Gretchen (1939–1950), a boxer who saved the lives of her owner and the owner's father by waking them up during the night when a fire broke out in their home.
- Moses Gigrandy (1929–1942), a monkey.
- Misty, a German Shepherd seeing-eye dog to a veteran blinded at the Battle of the Bulge in World War II.
- Sylvester, a rabbit who slept on his young polio-stricken master's bed for three years and was trained to play certain games. Shortly after the boy died, Sylvester passed on and was buried at Bonheur.
- Wiggles, a 29-year-old champion horse.
- Lizzy, a monitor lizard born in Africa.
- Buster Ward (1967–1979), a pigeon that flew into a moving mail truck.
- Bently the Pig (2012–2014), a micro-mini pig named for the child from MTV's teen mom, that traveled from Florida to Maryland on a plane. He caused a fire in the garage.
- Juan Carlos, a dog with personality.
- Also reported to be buried at Bonheur: a lion, squirrels, a guinea pig, and white mice.
