= Haymaking in the Auvergne =

Painting by Rosa Bonheur

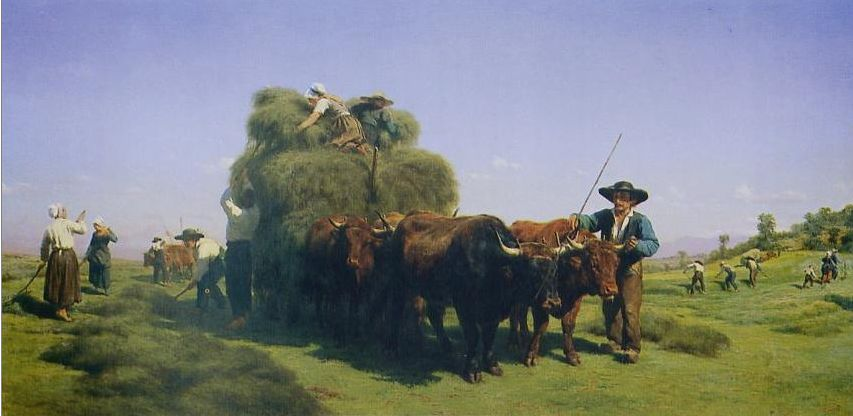
- Artist: Rosa Bonheur
- Year: 1855
- Medium: Oil on canvas
- Dimensions: 215 cm × 422 cm (85 in × 166 in)
- Location: Château de Fontainebleau, Fontainebleau

Haymaking in the Auvergne (French: Fenaison d'Auvergne or La fenaison en Auvergne) is an 1855 oil painting by French artist Rosa Bonheur. It measures 215 cm × 422 cm (85 in × 166 in).

After her first great artistic success, Ploughing in the Nivernais exhibited at the Salon of 1849, Bonheur showed studies of two new paintings to French Minister of Fine Arts Charles de Morny, Duke of Morny. He rejected one, The Horse Fair, and commissioned Haymaking in the Auvergne instead. Bonheur focussed on completing The Horse Fair first, and De Morny attempted to change his mind after its good reception at the Paris Salon of 1853.

The painting depicts the loading of a hay onto a cart pulled by four oxen. The beasts to the right wait patiently, attended by a man in wide-brimmed hat. Other men are cutting grass with scythes, while women rake up the hay, and other people use pitchforks to lift the hay onto a large pile on the cart.

The painting was bought by the French state in 1854 for 20,000 francs. It won a gold medal when it was exhibited at the Salon of 1855 during the Exposition Universelle in Paris in 1855, as a pendant to Ploughing in the Nivernais. It was also exhibited as part of the retrospective of 19th century French art at the 1900 Exposition Universelle.

The painting was held at the Musée du Luxembourg from 1874 to 1878, and then moved to the Château de Fontainebleau, where it remains. A smaller version, 71.1 by 129 centimetres (28.0 in × 50.8 in) is in a private collection. The print of an engraving by William Turner Davey was published in London in 1878 by Louis Brall & Sons.
