= The Horse Fair =

Painting by Rosa Bonheur

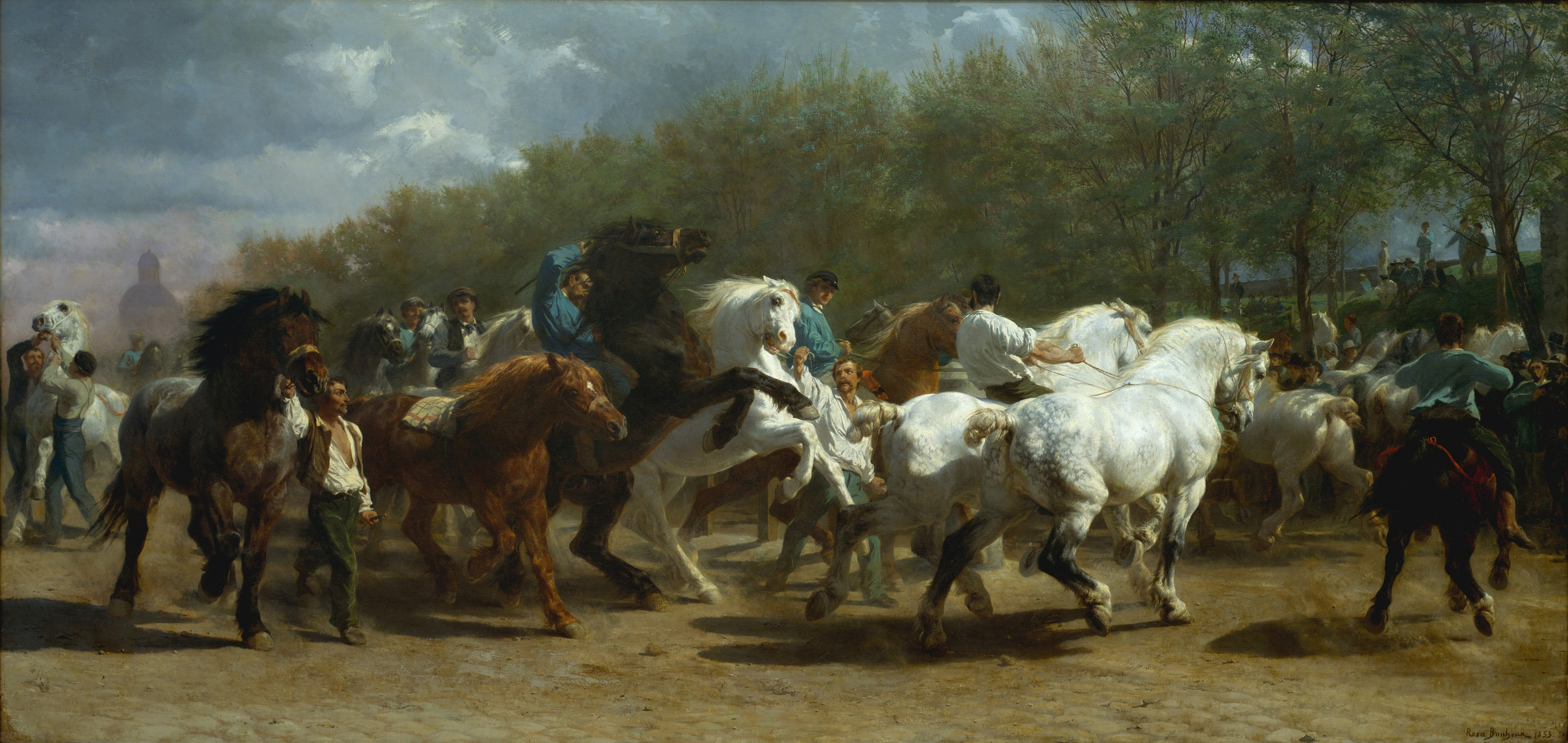
- Artist: Rosa Bonheur
- Year: 1852–55
- Medium: Oil on canvas
- Dimensions: 244.5 cm × 506.7 cm (96.3 in × 199.5 in)
- Location: Metropolitan Museum of Art, New York

The Horse Fair is an oil-on-canvas painting by French artist Rosa Bonheur, begun in 1852 and first exhibited at the Paris Salon of 1853. Bonheur added some finishing touches in 1855. The large work measures 96.25 in × 199.5 in (244.5 cm × 506.7 cm).

The painting depicts dealers selling horses at the horse market held on the Boulevard de l'Hôpital in Paris. The hospital of Salpêtrière can be seen in the left background.

The prime version of the painting has been in the collection of the Metropolitan Museum of Art in New York since 1887, when it was donated by Cornelius Vanderbilt II. It is on view in Gallery 812. A smaller version is on display at the National Gallery in London.

== Background ==
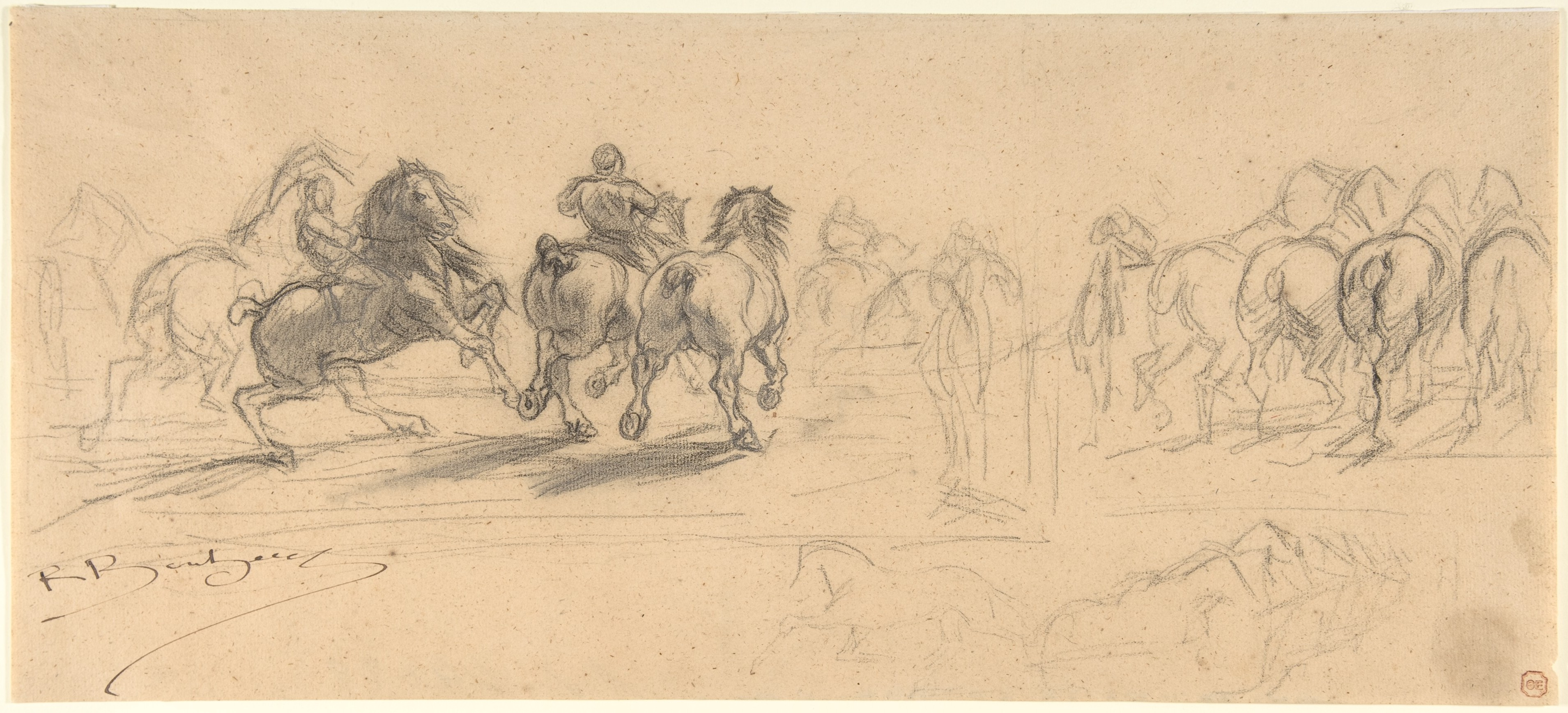
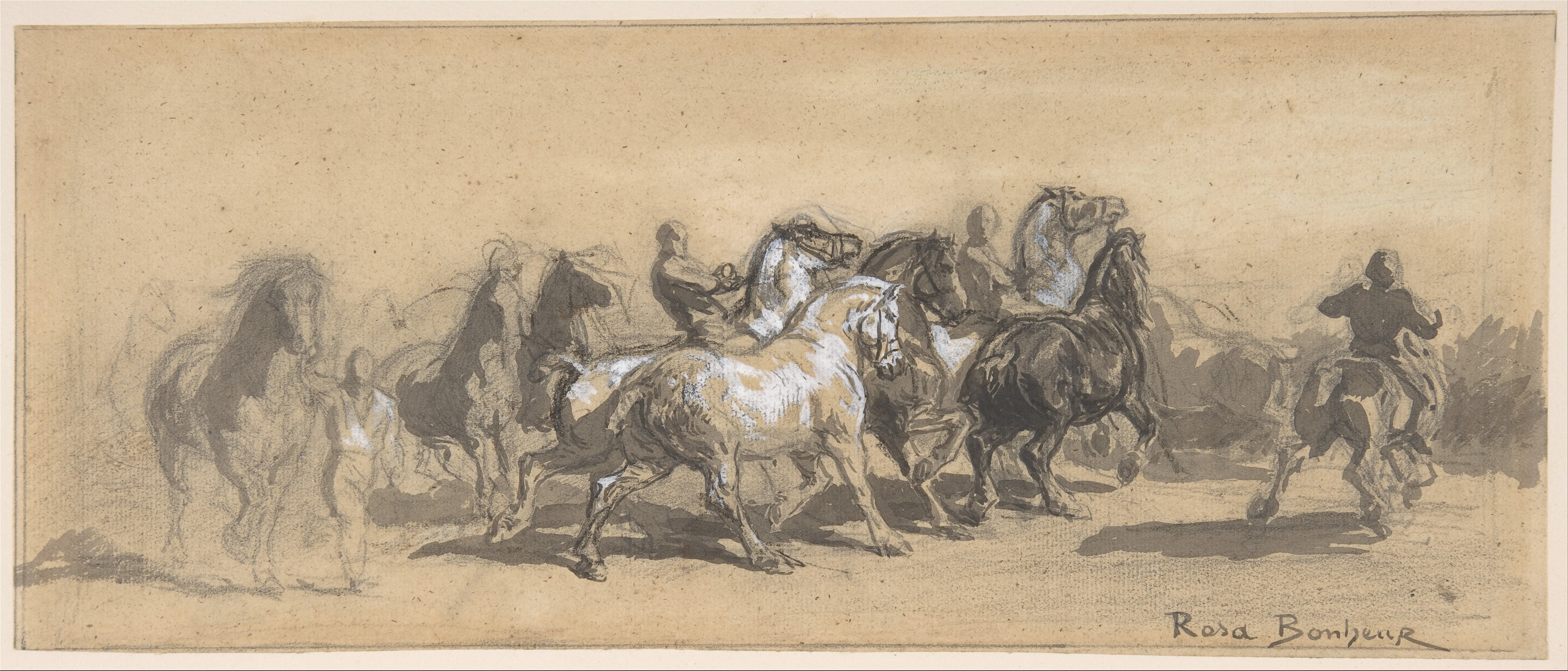
Two studies for The Horse Fair, both held by the Metropolitan Museum of Art

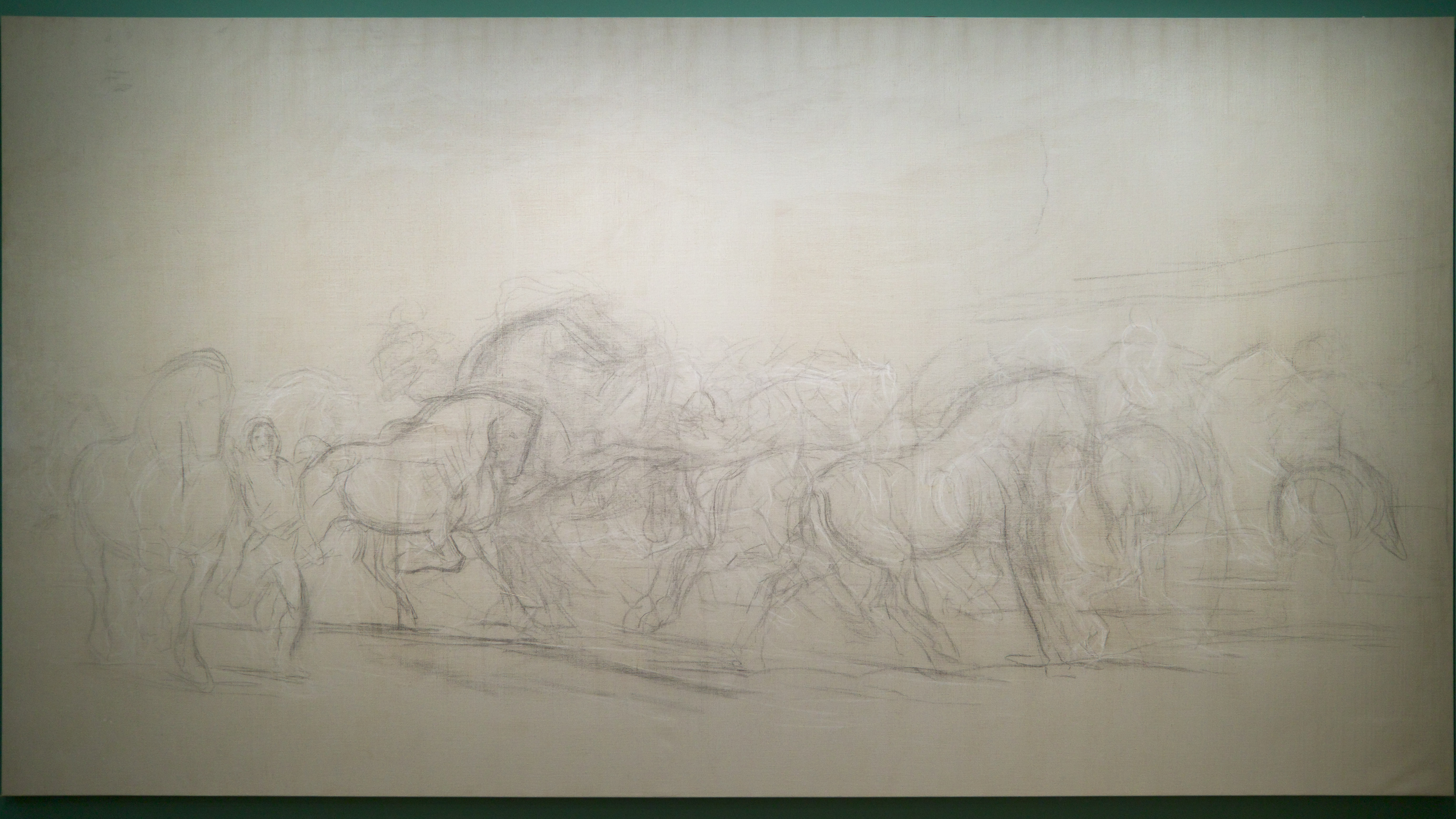
Abandoned sketch of the Horse Market, charcoal, black chalk and white chalk on canvas, 250 x 450 cm

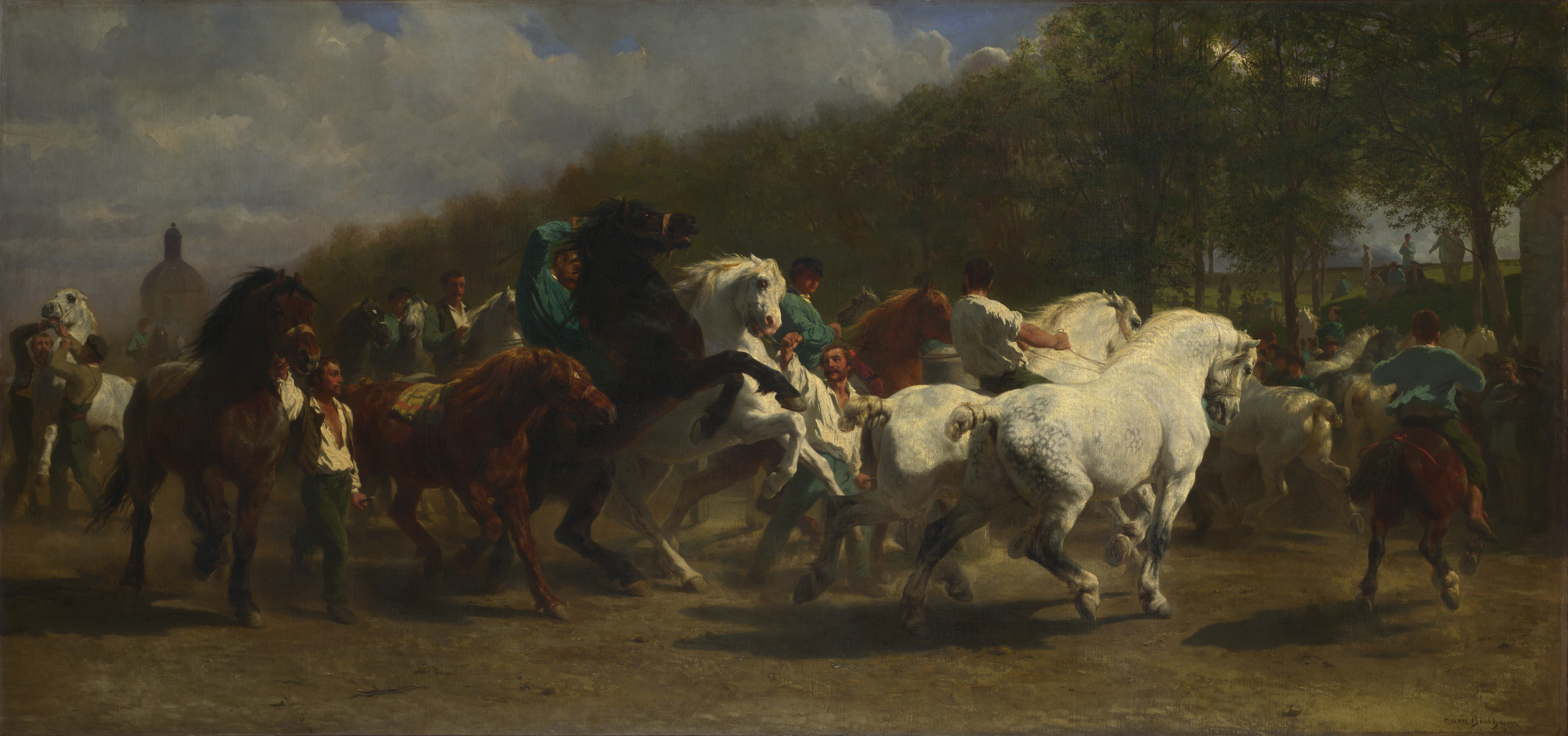
The 1855 reduced version, 120 cm × 254.6 cm (47.2 in × 100.2 in), in the National Gallery, London

Bonheur painted 'The Horse Fair' from a series of sketches of Percherons, and other draft horses, which she had made at the Paris horse market on the tree-lined Boulevard de l'Hôpital, near the Pitié-Salpêtrière Hospital, which is visible in the background to the painting. She attended the market twice weekly for a year and a half from summer of 1850 to the end of 1851. She sought a permission de travestissement from the Paris police to dress as a man, to avoid drawing attention to herself. She had earlier studied at a Paris slaughterhouse in 1845, a typical activity for an animal painter that she was the first woman to engage in, and had experienced harassment as a visible woman.

In addition to studies at the Paris horse market, she also modeled her animals on those from the Paris Omnibus Company. She broke from tradition in depicting the horse eye as it is, rather than using anthropomorphism for emotional effect. It has been suggested that one of the human figures is a self-portrait.

Bonheur routinely wore masculine clothes at home and in the country. The Horse Fair is printed as Plate 18 in Germaine Greer's book The Obstacle Race, in which she writes: "There was nothing titillating about the full trousers and painters' smocks that Bonheur wore", and quotes the artist herself as saying:

"I am a painter. I have earned my living honestly. My private life is nobody's concern."

Among the influences on Bonheur's work are the painters George Stubbs, Théodore Géricault, and Eugène Delacroix, and sculpture from Ancient Greece. She described the painting as her own Parthenon Frieze. It is signed and dated, "Rosa Bonheur 1853.5".

== Exhibition ==
The painting was praised by the critics when it was first exhibited at the Paris Salon in May 1853. Several commented on the masculine nature of the work. Earlier, Bonheur had offered studies of two paintings to French Minister of Fine Arts Charles de Morny, Duke of Morny, for consideration of a state commission. He selected the other work, Haymaking in the Auvergne, now held by the museum at the Château de Fontainebleau. Bonheur rejected his attempt to change his mind after the 1853 exhibition.

The painting was subsequently shown in Ghent in 1853 and then in Bordeaux in 1854, but the city declined to buy it for FF 15,000. It was sold to the British art dealer Ernest Gambart in 1854 for FF 40,000. Bonheur added finishing touches in 1855.

It was shown at various locations during a tour of Britain in 1855 to 1857. In London, the painting was shown in the home of Edwin Henry Landseer, the artist well known for his works on animals. Queen Victoria requested a private viewing at Buckingham Palace. It was the most acclaimed of Bonheur's works, and is described by the Metropolitan Museum as one of its best-known works of art.

It was sold to cotton trader William Parkinson Wright in 1857 for FF 30,000, and then sold to Alexander Turney Stewart in 1866. After the deaths of Stewart in 1876 and of his widow Cornelia in 1886, the painting was bought at auction by Cornelius Vanderbilt II for $53,000 in March 1887, and immediately donated to the Metropolitan Museum of Art in New York.

== Legacy and influence ==
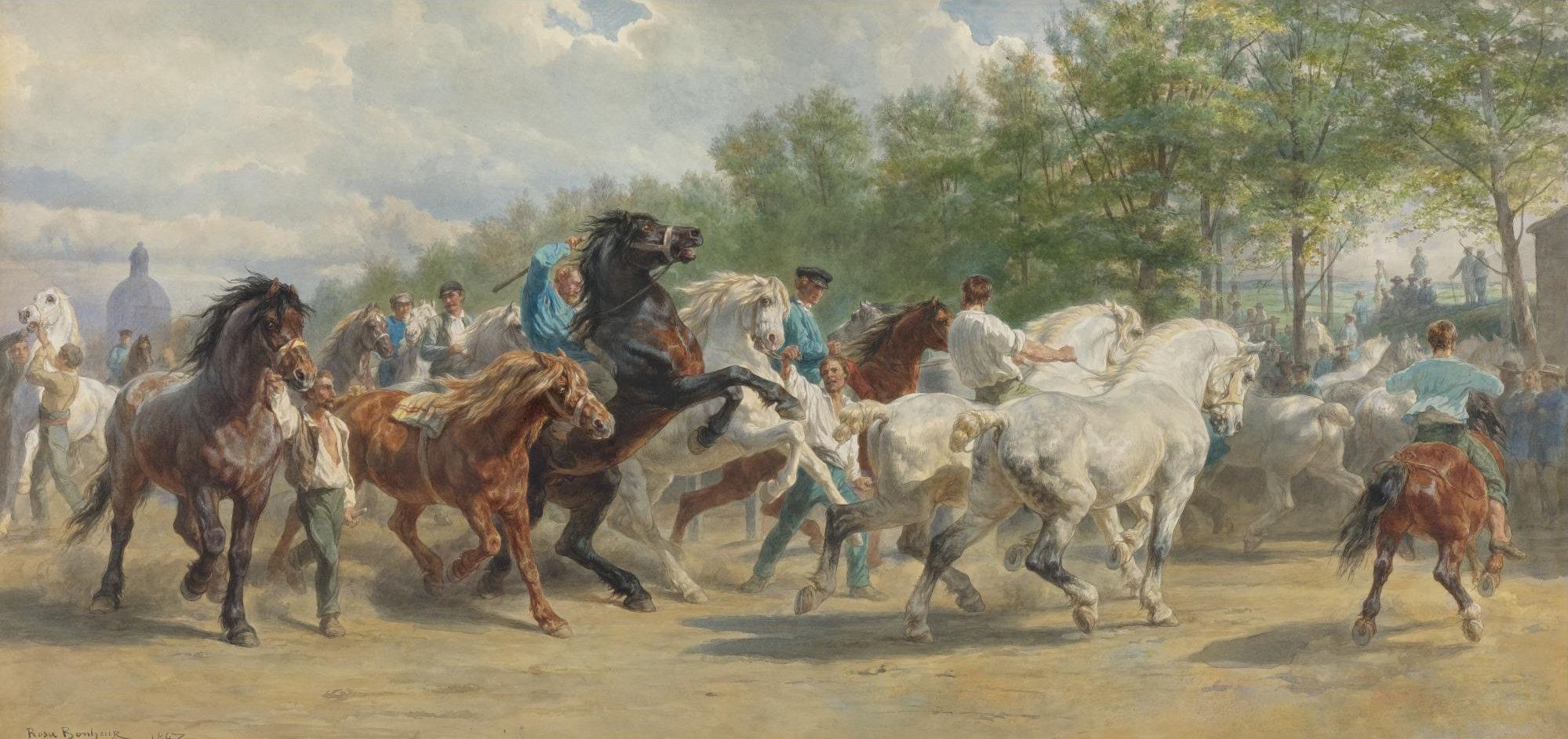
Watercolour from 1867, 24 in × 50 in (61 cm × 127 cm); sold at Sotheby's in 2007

The first engraving of the work was made by Jules Jacques Veyrassat during the Paris Salon of 1853, while the often-reproduced engraving by Thomas Landseer helped it achieve a wide popularity. Landseer's engraving was based on a half-size replica, 48 in × 100 in (120 cm × 250 cm), c.1855, by Bonheur and her partner Nathalie Micas, which was donated to the National Gallery in London in 1859 from the estate of Jacob Bell.

Bonheur also made a second half-size replica, which she preferred, formerly in the collection of the McConnel family (owners of a cotton mill in Cressbrook, Derbyshire) and in the collection of Jack Wheeler by 1989, when it was exhibited at Meadows Museum in Dallas; and a third half-size replica made for Commander Arthur Hill Ommanney Peter Hill-Lowe RN in Somerset (first husband of Beatrice Hill-Lowe) was sold at Sotheby's in 1978, and is now in a private collection in Baton Rouge. A fourth much smaller version, 19 in × 35 in (48 cm × 89 cm) was in the private collection of Karl Lowenstein. An autograph watercolour version 24 in × 50 in (61 cm × 127 cm) dated 1867 was sold by Sotheby's in New York in 2007. A similar watercolour version was sold by Knoedler in 1982.

Painter Molly Luce claimed that The Horse Fair was the first work which influenced her in her decision to become an artist, and the work also inspired a young Wayne Thiebaud.

In the literary world, The Horse Fair inspired a 2000 anthology by poet Robin Becker.

The painting, with its large scale, realistic style, and strong sense of movement, can be considered proto-cinematic.

Bonheur's brother, Isidore Bonheur, cast a bronze relief plaque based on the painting for her monument at Fontainebleau. The memorial included a large statue of a bull, on a pedestal with four relief plaques reproducing her most popular paintings; it was destroyed in 1941, but a cast of the plaque is held by the Dahesh Museum of Art in New York.
