= Rosa Bonheur =

French painter and sculptor (1822–1899)

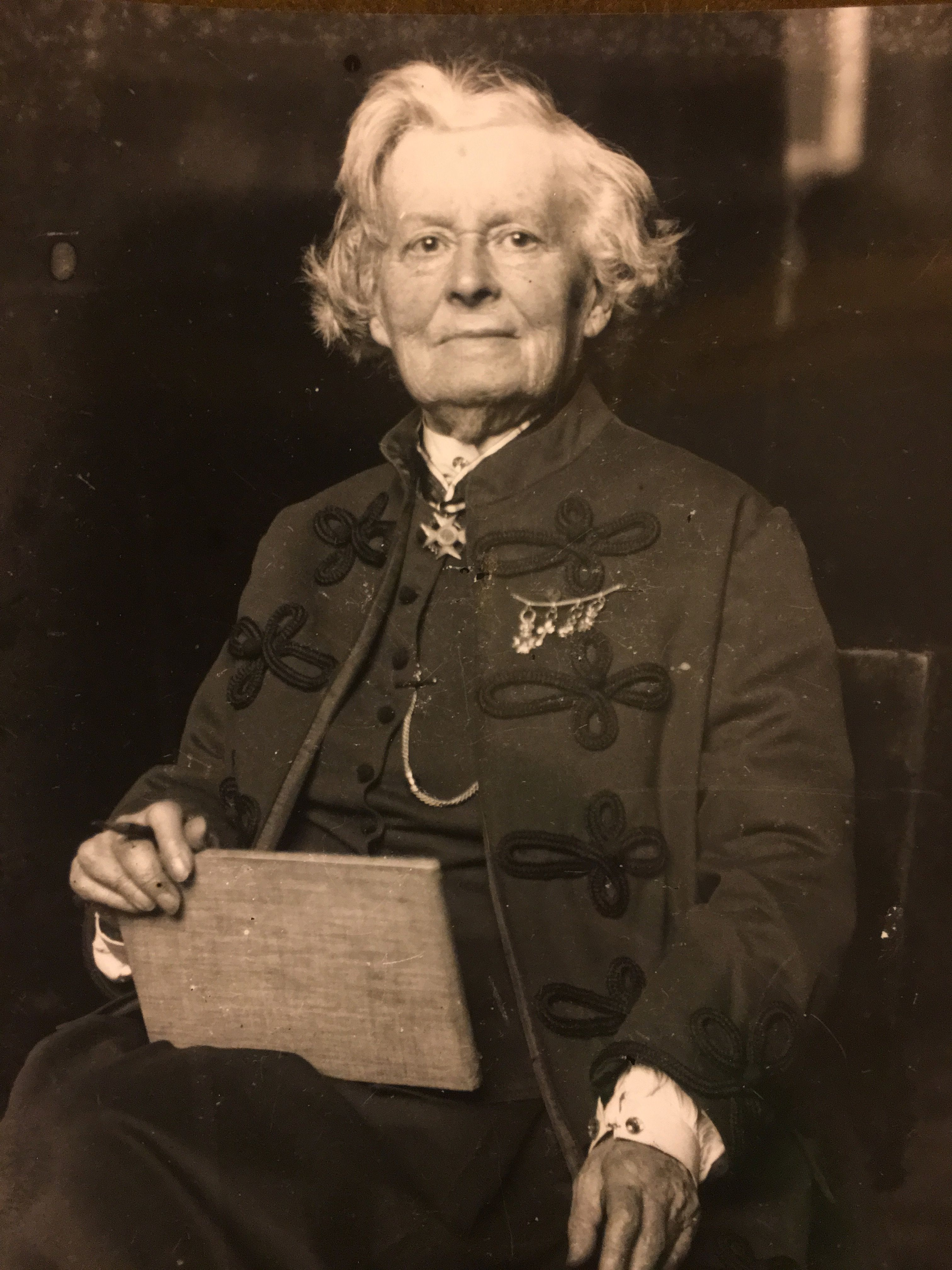
- Bonheur, c. 1895–99
- Born: Marie-Rosalie Bonheur; 16 March 1822; Bordeaux, France
- Died: 25 May 1899 (aged 77); Thomery, France
- Known for: Painting, sculpture
- Notable work: Ploughing in the Nivernais, The Horse Fair
- Movement: Realism
- Father: Oscar-Raymond Bonheur

Signature
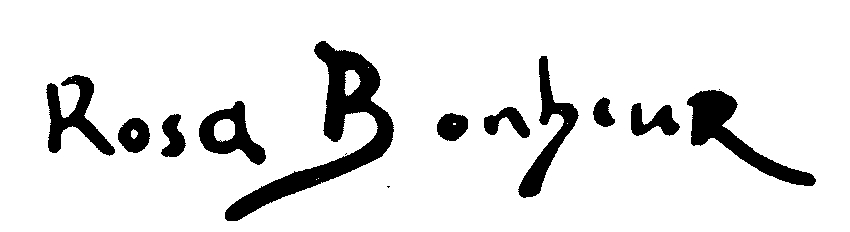

Rosa Bonheur, born Marie-Rosalie Bonheur (French: [ʁoza bɔnœʁ]; 16 March 1822 – 25 May 1899), was a French painter, sculptor and animalier. Her paintings include Ploughing in the Nivernais, first exhibited at the Salon of 1849, and now in the Musée d'Orsay in Paris, and The Horse Fair (in French: Le marché aux chevaux), which was exhibited at the Salon of 1853 (finished in 1855) and is now in the Metropolitan Museum of Art in New York City. Bonheur was widely considered to be the most famous female painter of the nineteenth century. She made sculptures in a realist style.

It has been said that Bonheur was openly lesbian, as she lived with her partner Nathalie Micas for over 40 years until Micas's death. After that she lived with American painter Anna Elizabeth Klumpke. However, others assert that nothing supports this speculation.

== Early development and artistic training ==
Bonheur was born on 16 March 1822 in Bordeaux, Gironde, the oldest child in a family of artists. Her mother was Sophie Bonheur (née Marquis), a piano teacher; she died when Rosa was eleven. Her father was Oscar-Raymond Bonheur, a landscape and portrait painter who encouraged his daughter's artistic talents. Though of Jewish origin, the Bonheur family adhered to Saint-Simonianism, a Christian socialist sect that promoted the education of women alongside men. Bonheur's siblings included the animal painters Auguste Bonheur and Juliette Bonheur, as well as the animal sculptor Isidore Jules Bonheur. Francis Galton used the Bonheurs as an example of the eponymous "Hereditary Genius" in his 1869 essay.

Bonheur moved to Paris in 1828 at the age of six with her mother and siblings, after her father had gone ahead of them to establish a residence and income there. By family accounts, she had been an unruly child and had a difficult time learning to read, though she would sketch for hours at a time with pencil and paper before she learned to talk. Her mother taught her to read and write by asking her to choose and draw a different animal for each letter of the alphabet. The artist credited her love of drawing animals to these reading lessons with her mother.

At school, she was often disruptive and was expelled numerous times. After a failed apprenticeship with a seamstress at the age of twelve, her father undertook her training as a painter. Her father allowed her to pursue her interest in painting animals by bringing live animals to the family's studio for studying.

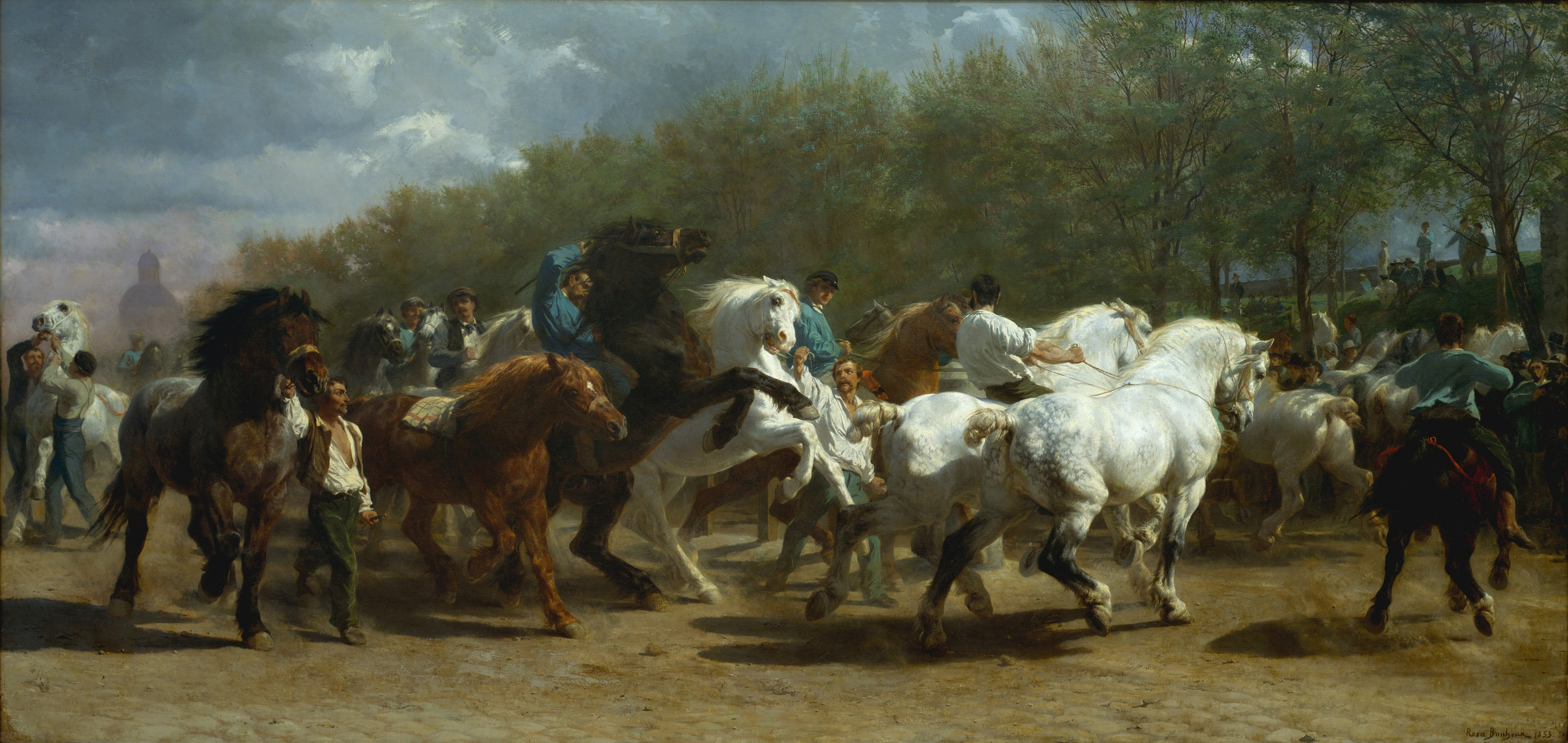
The Horse Fair (1852–55; Metropolitan Museum of Art)

Following the traditional art school curriculum of the period, Bonheur began her training by copying images from drawing books and by sketching plaster models. As her training progressed, she made studies of domesticated animals, including horses, sheep, cows, goats, rabbits, and other animals in the pastures around the perimeter of Paris, the open fields of Villiers near Levallois-Perret, and the still-wild Bois de Boulogne. At fourteen, she began to copy paintings at the Louvre. Among her favorite painters were Nicolas Poussin and Peter Paul Rubens, though she also copied the paintings of Paulus Potter, Frans Pourbus the Younger, Louis Léopold Robert, Salvatore Rosa, and Karel Dujardin.

She studied animal anatomy and osteology in the abattoirs of Paris and dissected animals at the École nationale vétérinaire d'Alfort, the National Veterinary Institute in Paris. There, she prepared detailed studies that she later used as references for her paintings and sculptures. During this period, she befriended the father-and-son comparative anatomists and zoologists, Étienne Geoffroy Saint-Hilaire and Isidore Geoffroy Saint-Hilaire.

== Early success and development of career ==
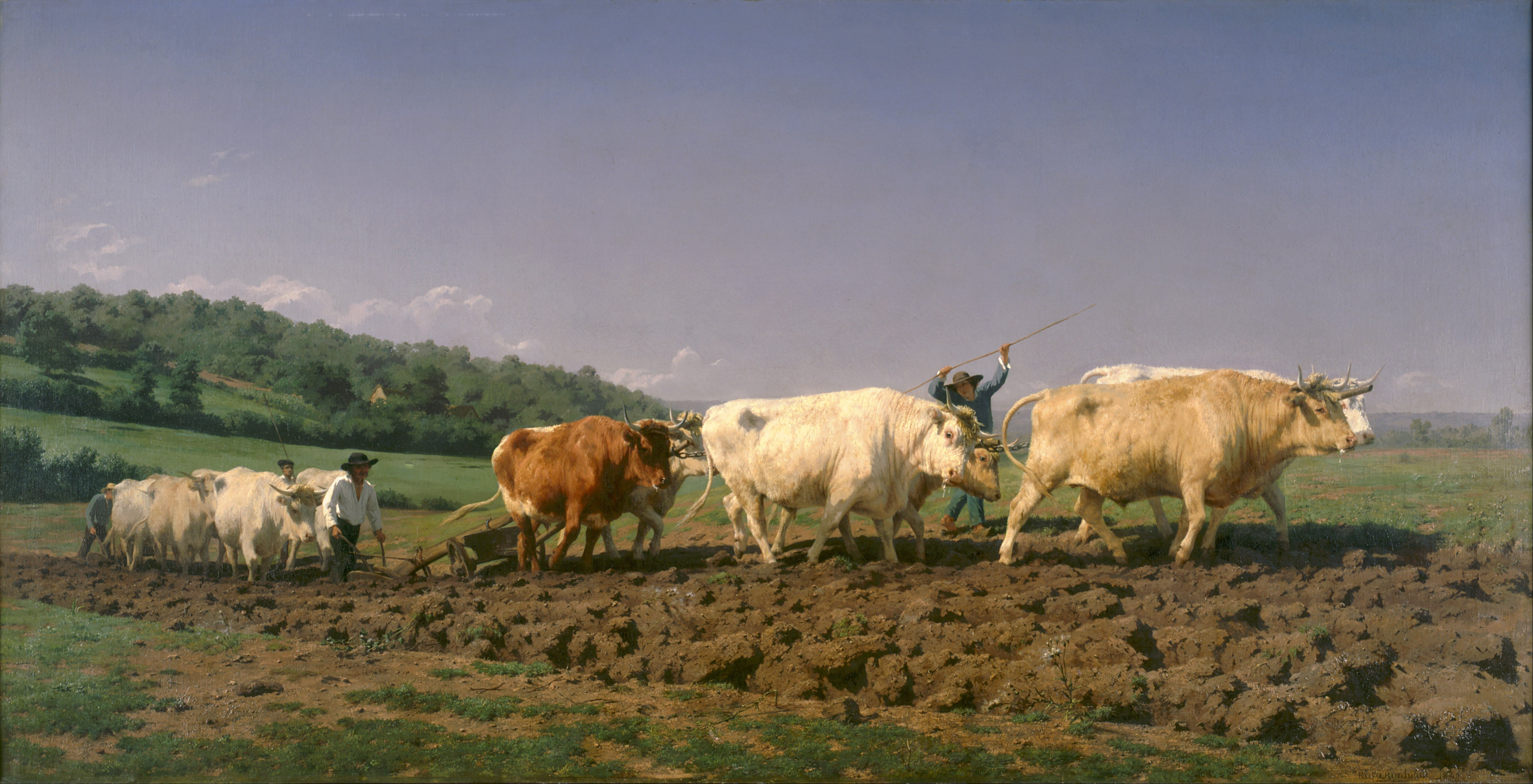
Ploughing in the Nivernais, Musée d'Orsay

Bonheur's first major success can be attributed to The Horse Fair, which was first displayed at the Paris Salon in 1853. The painting was started in 1851 and completed in 1855. It measures eight by sixteen feet (2.4 by 4.9 m) and depicts the horse market held in Paris, on the tree-lined boulevard de l'Hôpital, near the Pitié-Salpêtrière Hospital, which is visible in the painting's background. There is a reduced version that can be found in the National Gallery located in London. Bonheur had been displaying her work at the Paris Salon for several years before displaying The Horse Fair, earning medals and smaller praise. This even resulted in the commissioning of Ploughing in the Nivernais from the state, which was exhibited in 1849 and is now on display in the Musée d'Orsay located in Paris. Due to The Horse Fair sparking debate and controversy among critics and collectors when it was first displayed at the Paris Salon, it allowed Bonheur to create a public image and insert herself into the international art world. One such debate was that Comte de Nieuwerkerke (1811 - 1892) implied that Bonheur had been commissioned by the state to create the work, though there is no known documentation to back said implication, and Bonheur herself went through the effort of discrediting it. In 1856, Bonheur traveled to England and Scotland with Micas, where she met Queen Victoria, John Ruskin, and other major British artists. In Scotland, she completed sketches and studies for later works such as Highland Shepherd, completed in 1859, The Highland Raid, completed in 1860, and other paintings. These pieces depicted a way of life in the Scottish Highlands that had disappeared a century earlier, and had an enormous appeal to Victorian sensibilities.

Bonheur exhibited her work at the Palace of Fine Arts and The Woman's Building at the 1893 World's Columbian Exposition in Chicago, Illinois. In 1889 and 1890, she developed a friendship with American sculptor Cyrus Dallin, who was studying in Paris. Together they travelled to Neuilly outside of Paris to sketch the animals and cast of Buffalo Bill Cody's Wild West Show at their encampment. In 1890 Bonheur painted Cody on horseback. Dallin's work from this period, "A Signal of Peace" would also be displayed in Chicago in 1893 and be the first major step in his career.

Though she was more popular in England than in her native France, she was decorated with the French Legion of Honour by Empress Eugénie in 1865, and was promoted to Officer of the Order in 1894. She was the first female artist to be given this award.

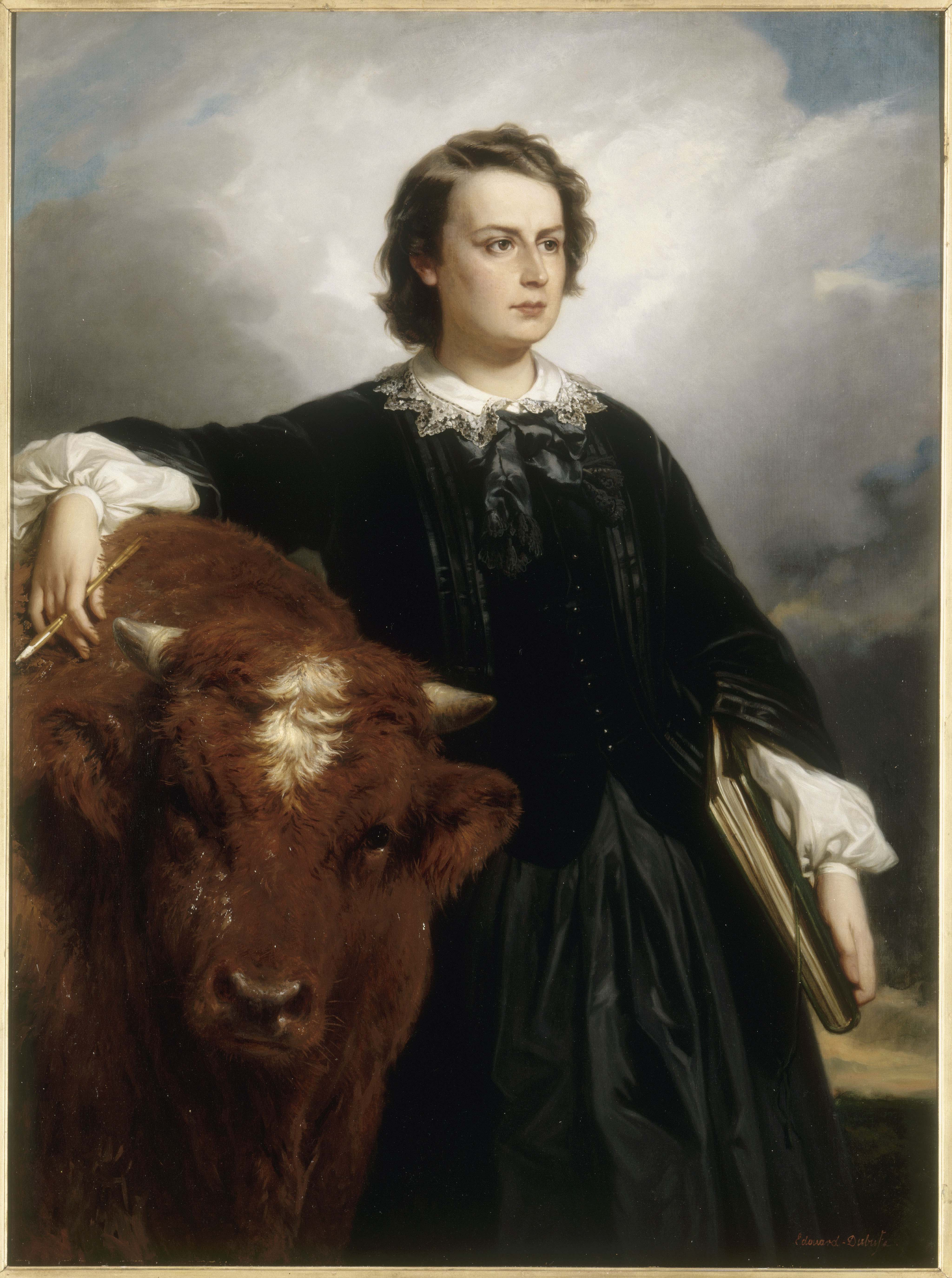
Edouard Louis Dubufe, Portrait of Rosa Bonheur 1857. Symbolic of her work as an Animalière, the bull was painted by Bonheur herself.

== Patronage and the market for her work ==
Bonheur was represented by the art dealer Ernest Gambart (1814–1902). It is unknown when the two of them first met, but by 1854, the two were on close terms. Gambart served as a friend, sponsor, and promoter for Bonheur's work and went to great lengths to ensure her work would be pushed to wider audiences. By 1855, Gambart had bought The Horse Fair for forty thousand francs so that he could display the painting in an exhibition of French art located in England. Through this exhibition, Bonheur's work was recognized by several English critics, such as William Rossetti, who commented on it positively. Regardless of the positive attention that Bonheur's work gained, she still received backlash for the fact that she was a woman artist. But through The Horse Fair being displayed in England, even at one point being moved to Buckingham Palace for a brief time to be studied by Queen Victoria, it erased all doubts that Bonheur's work was made by herself and paved the way for her success.

Many engravings of Bonheur's work were created from reproductions by Charles George Lewis (1808–1880), one of the finest engravers of the day.

In 1859, her success enabled her to move to the Château de By near Fontainebleau, not far from Paris, where she lived for the rest of her life. The house is now a museum dedicated to her.

== Personal life and legacy ==
Women were often only reluctantly educated as artists in Bonheur's day, and by becoming such a successful artist she helped to open doors to the women artists who followed her.

Bonheur was known for wearing men's clothing; she attributed her choice of trousers to their practicality for working with animals (see Rational dress).

She lived with her first partner, Nathalie Micas, for over 40 years until Micas' death, and later began a relationship with the American painter Anna Elizabeth Klumpke. At a time when lesbianism was regarded as animalistic and deranged by most French officials, Bonheur's outspokenness about her personal life was groundbreaking.

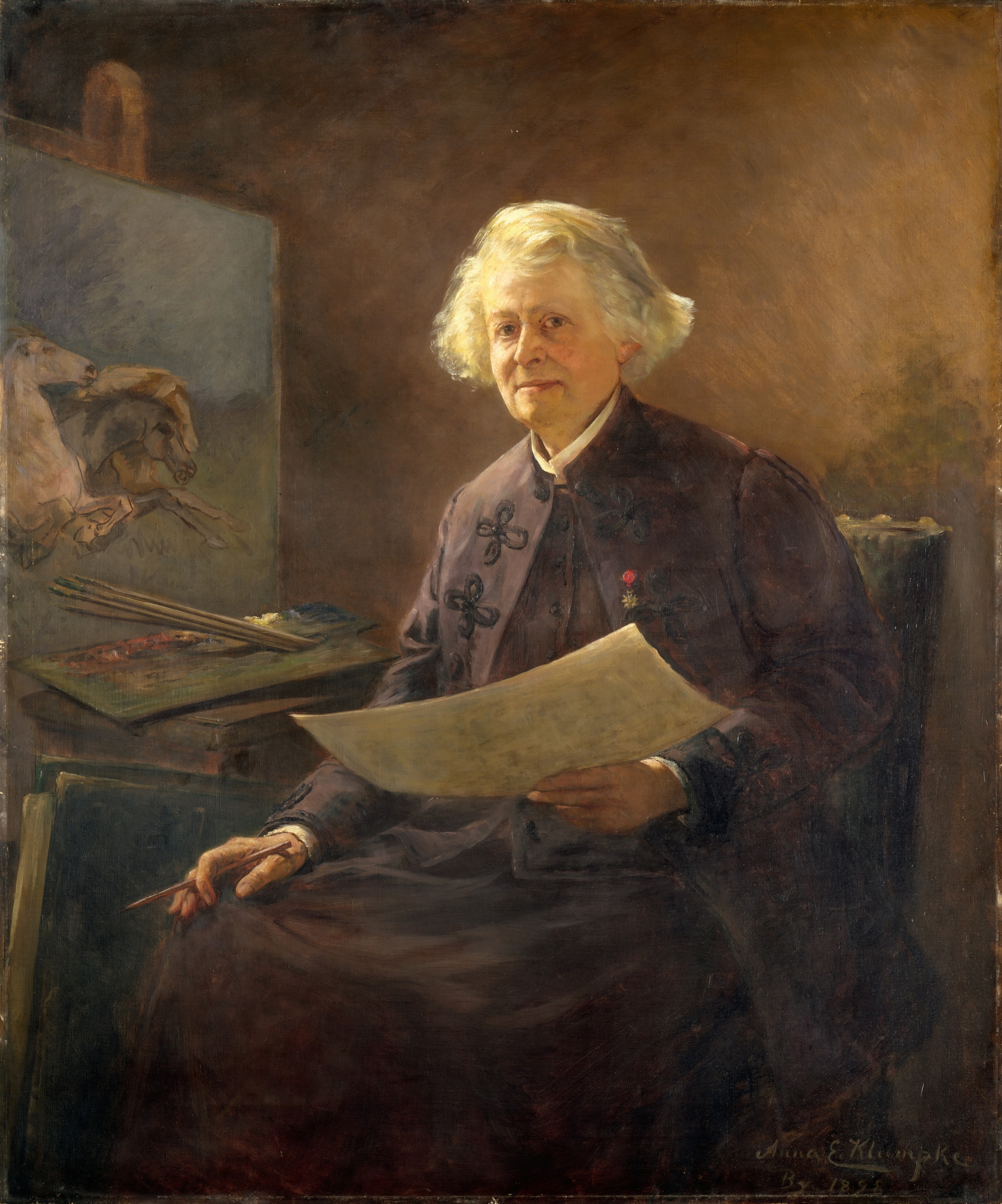
Portrait of Bonheur by Anna Elizabeth Klumpke

In a world where gender expression was policed, Bonheur broke boundaries by deciding to wear trousers, shirts, and ties, although not in her painted portraits or posed photographs. She did not do this because she wanted to be a man, though she occasionally referred to herself as a grandson or brother when talking about her family; rather, she identified with the power and freedom reserved for men. It also broadcast her sexuality at a time when the lesbian stereotype consisted of women who cut their hair short, wore trousers, and chain-smoked. Rosa Bonheur did all three. Bonheur never explicitly said she was a lesbian, but her lifestyle and the way she talked about her female partners suggest this. Bonheur, while taking pleasure in activities usually reserved for men (such as hunting and smoking), viewed her womanhood as something far superior to anything a man could offer or experience. She viewed men as stupid and mentioned that the only males she had time or attention for were the bulls she painted.

From 1800 until 2013, women in Paris, France, were technically forbidden from wearing trousers without permission from the police, with only a few exceptions. Enforcement of this largely stopped during World War I and afterward, but in Bonheur's time, it was still an issue. In the 1850s, Bonheur had to ask permission from the police to wear trousers, as this was her preferred attire to go to the sheep and cattle markets to study the animals she painted.

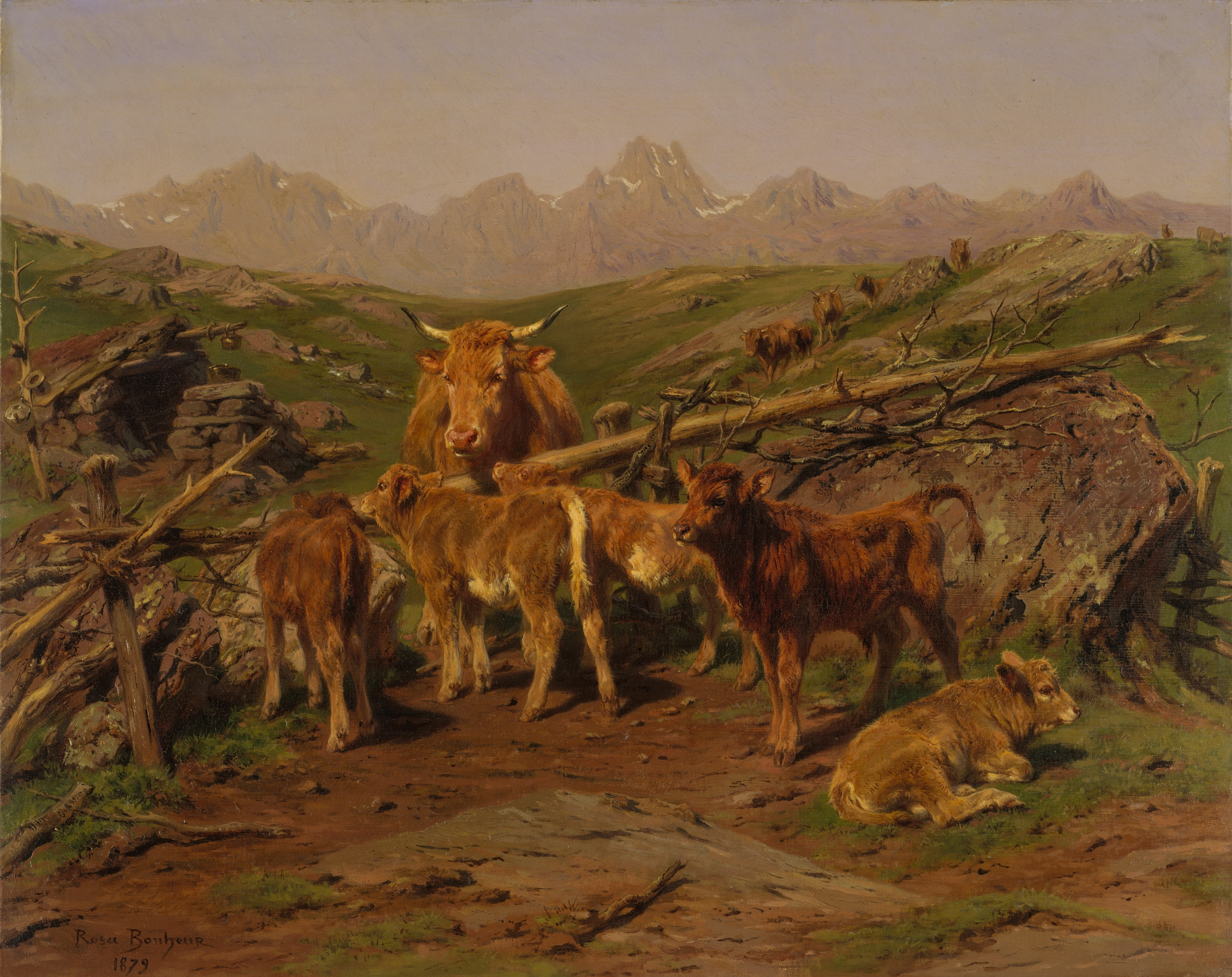
Weaning the Calves, 1879

Having chosen to never become an adjunct or appendage to a man in terms of painting, she decided she would be her own boss and that she would lean on herself and her female partners instead. She had her partners focus on the home life while she took on the role of breadwinner by concentrating on her painting. Bonheur's legacy paved the way for other lesbian artists who didn't favour the life society had laid out for them.

Bonheur died on 25 May 1899, at the age of 77, at Thomery (By), France. She was buried together with Nathalie Micas (1824 – 24 June 1889), her lifelong companion and lover, at Père Lachaise Cemetery, Paris. Klumpke was Bonheur's sole heir after her death, and later joined Micas and Bonheur in the same cemetery upon her death. Bonheur, Micas, and Klumpke's collective tombstone reads, "Friendship is divine affection". Many of her paintings, which had not previously been shown publicly, were sold at auction in Paris in 1900.

Along with other realist painters of the 19th century, for much of the 20th century Bonheur fell from fashion, and in 1978 a critic described Ploughing in the Nivernais as "entirely forgotten and rarely dragged out from oblivion"; however, that same year it was part of a series of paintings sent to China by the French government for an exhibition titled "The French Landscape and Peasant, 1820–1905". Since then, her reputation has been somewhat revived.

Rosa Bonheur Memorial Park is a pet cemetery located in Elkridge, Maryland, established in 1935, and actively operated until 2002.

Art historian Linda Nochlin’s 1971 essay Why Have There Been No Great Women Artists?, considered a pioneering essay for both feminist art history and feminist art theory, contains a section about and titled "Rosa Bonheur."

From December 12, 1989, to March 11, 1990, the National Museum of Women in the Arts displayed Rosa Bonheur: Selected Works from American Collections. The exhibit of over 40 works was “the first exhibition of Bonheur’s paintings, drawings, and sculpture in the United States since the 1933 exhibition at the San Francisco Museum of Fine Arts.” The exhibit also included letters written to her student Paul Chardin and “provide insight into the historical and cultural background of Bonheur’s career.”

One of Bonheur's works, Monarchs of the Forest, sold at auction in 2008 for just over $200,000.

In homage to the painter, four Parisian guinguettes bear the name Rosa Bonheur. The first opened in 2008 in the Parc des Buttes-Chaumont. It is mentioned at length by Virginie Despentes in her series of novels, Vernon Subutex. The second in 2014 on the banks of the Seine at the Port des Invalides, the third in 2017 in Asnières-sur-Seine, and the fourth in 2021 in the Bois de Vincennes, home of the Rosa Bonheur Modern Team (RBMT) of various sports teams and a pep band. Each of the four locations of Rosa Bonheur is home to a multilingual pop choir, collectively known as "Viens Chanter Bonheur," which is led by musician and ceramic artist Damien Bousquet.

On 16 March 2022, Google honoured Bonheur with a Doodle to mark the bicentennial of her birth. The Doodle reached five countries: the United States, Ireland, France, Iceland and India.

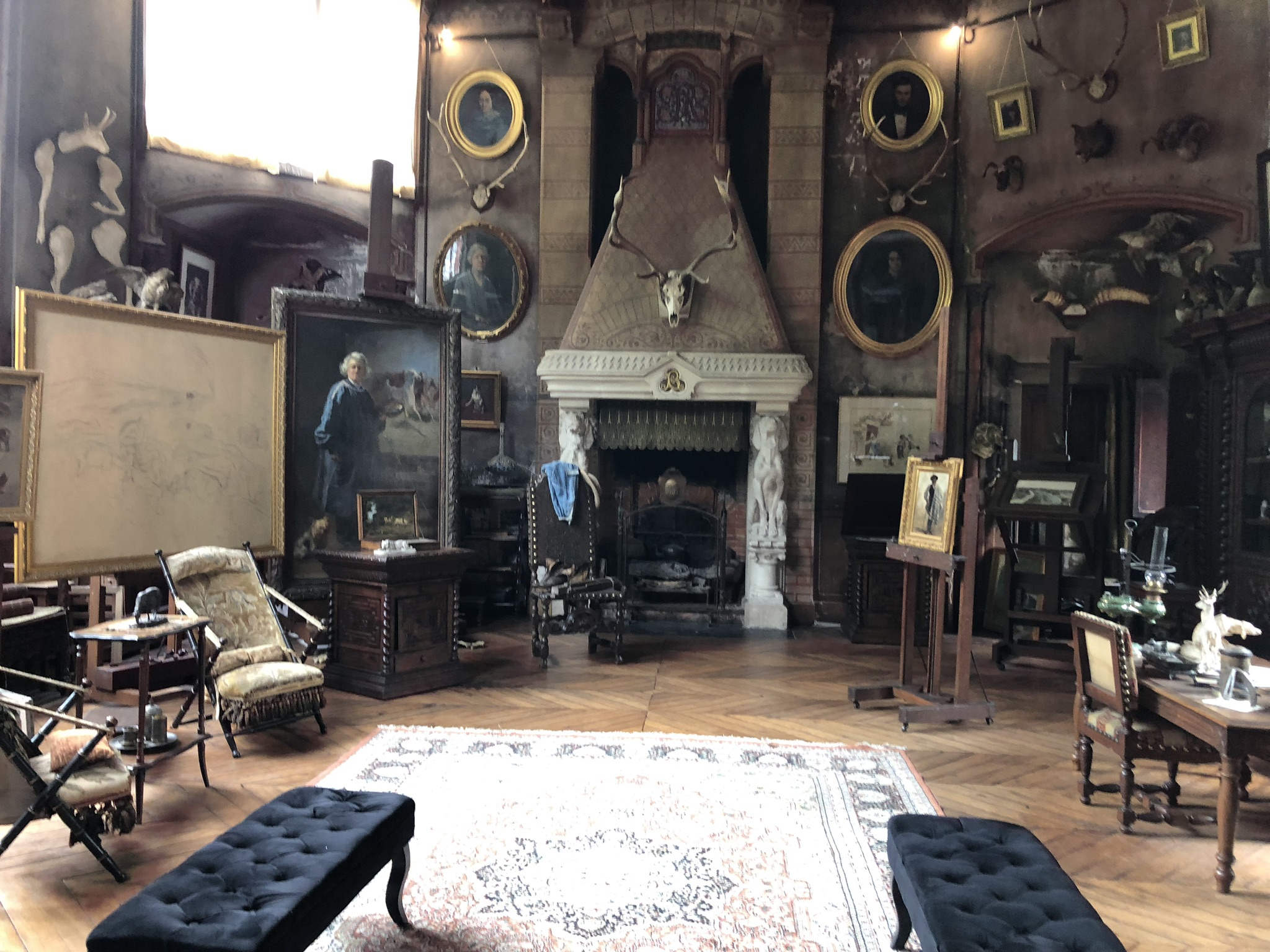
Rosa Bonheur Studio and museum. Thomery France

== Biographical works ==
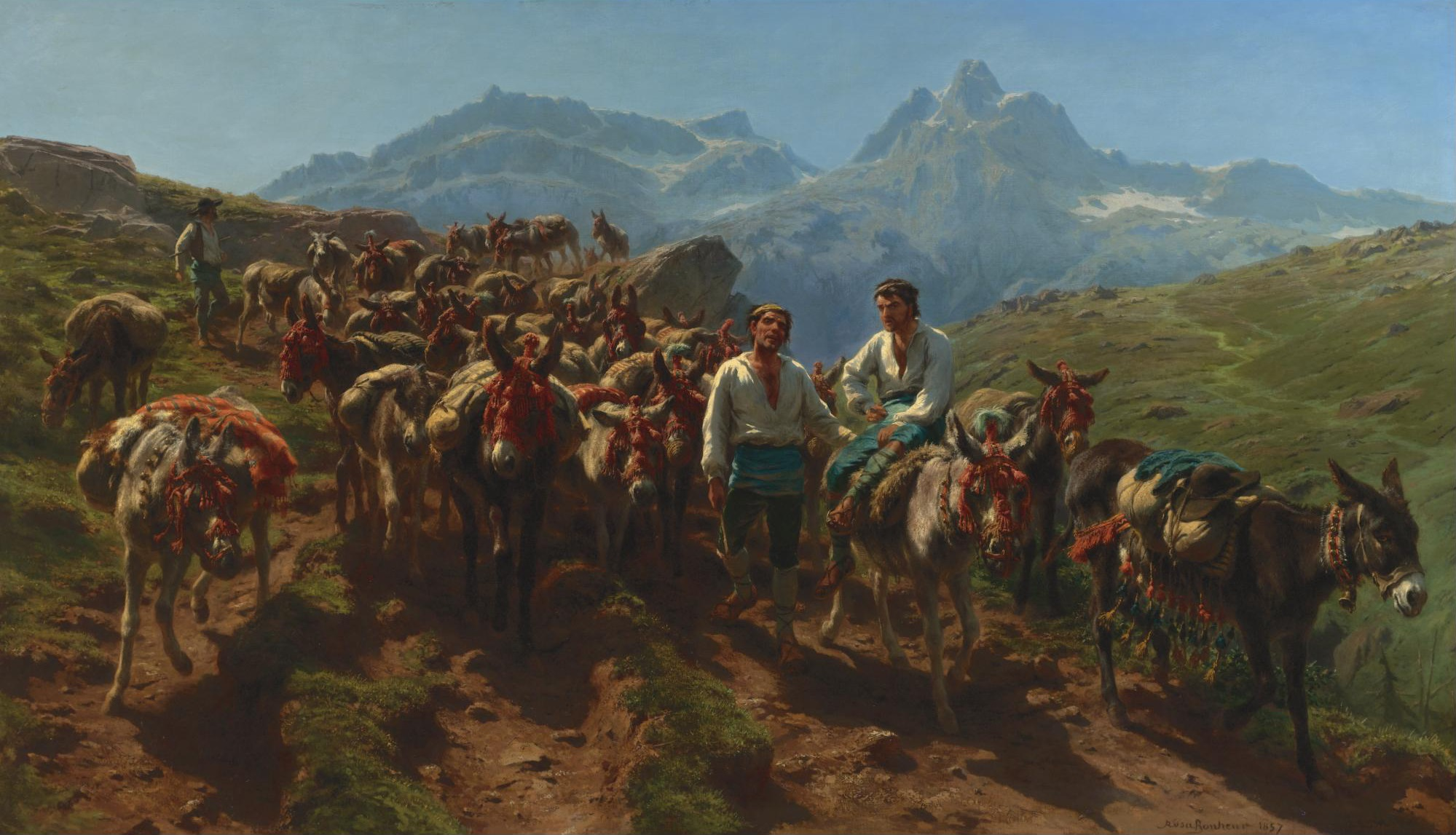
Spanish muleteers crossing the Pyrenees, 1875

The first biography of Bonheur was published during her lifetime: a pamphlet written by Eugène de Mirecourt, Les Contemporains: Rosa Bonheur, which appeared just after her Salon success with The Horse Fair in 1856. Bonheur later corrected and annotated this document.

The 1905 book Women Painters of the World (assembled and edited by Walter Shaw Sparrow) was subtitled "from the time of Caterina Vigri, 1413–1463, to Rosa Bonheur and the present day".

The second account was written by Anna Klumpke, Bonheur's companion in the last year of her life. Klumpke's biography, published in 1909 as Rosa Bonheur: sa vie, son oeuvre, was translated in 1997 by Gretchen Van Slyke and published as Rosa Bonheur: The Artist's (Auto)biography, so-named because Klumpke had used Bonheur's first-person voice.

Reminiscences of Rosa Bonheur, edited by Theodore Stanton (the son of Elizabeth Cady Stanton), was published in London and New York in 1910. It includes numerous correspondences between Bonheur and her family and friends, in which she describes her art-making practices.

== List of works ==
- Ploughing in the Nivernais, 1849
- The Horse Fair, 1852–1855
- Haymaking in the Auvergne, 1853–1855
- The Highland Shepherd, 1859
- A Family of Deer, 1865
- Changing meadows (Changement de pâturages), 1868
- The Monarch of the Herd, 1868
- Spanish muleteers crossing the Pyrenees (Muletiers espagnols traversent les Pyrénées), 1875
- Noon Day Rest, 1877
- Weaning the Calves, 1879
- The Lion at Home, 1881
- Relay Hunting, 1887
- Portrait of William F. Cody, 1889
- Indian Encampment, 1889

== Gallery ==
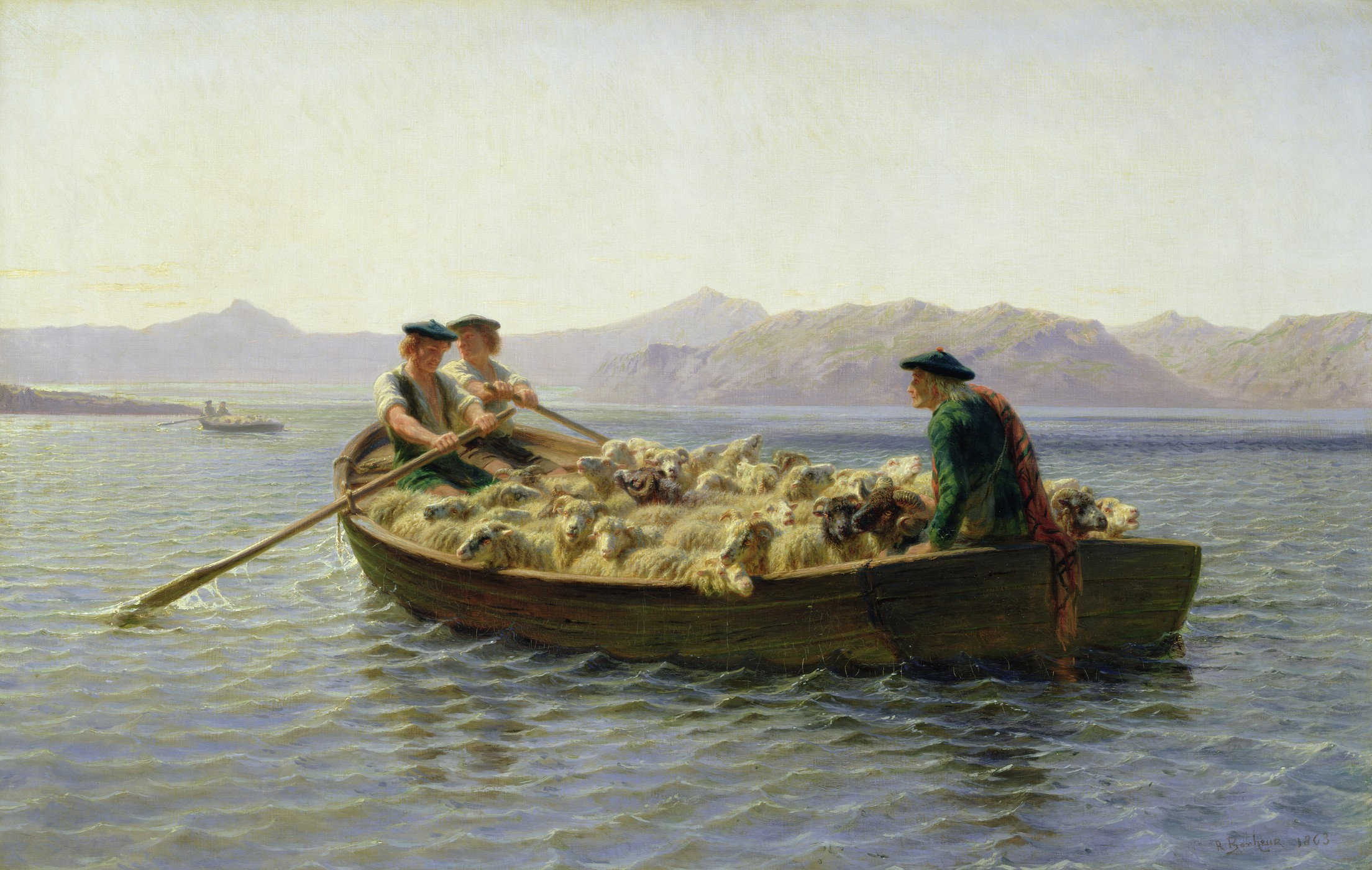
Changement de pâturages (1863), Hamburger Kunsthalle

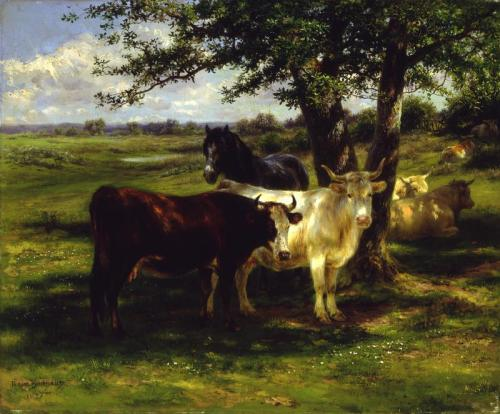
Noon Day Rest (1877), Aberdeen Art Gallery

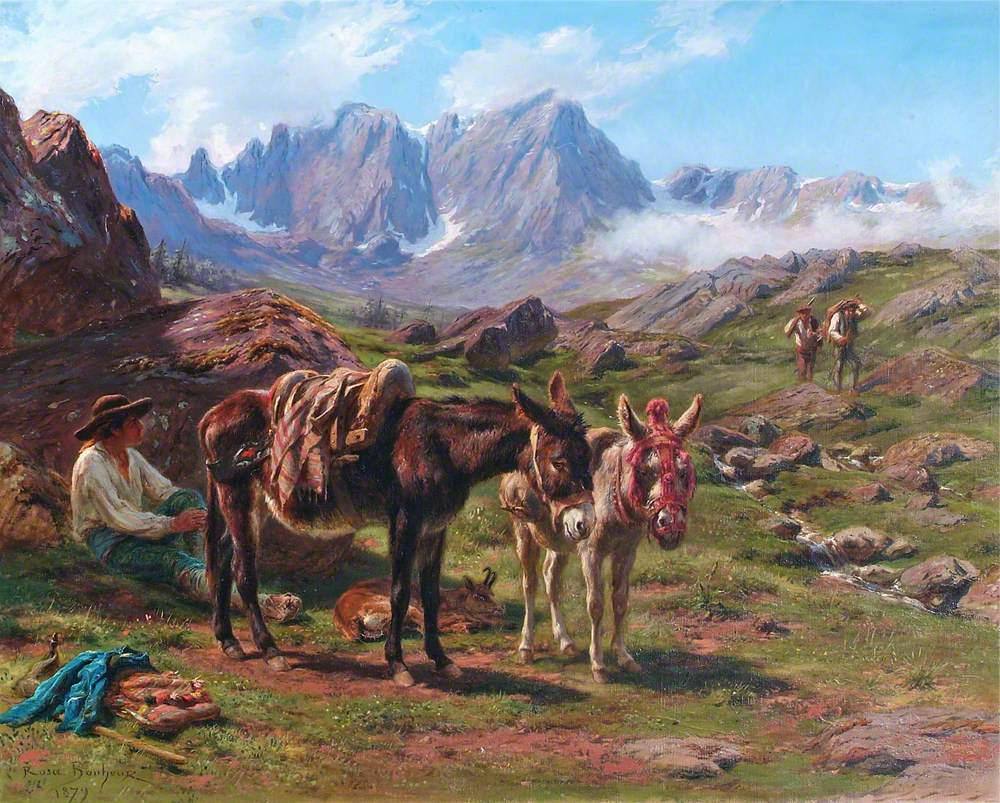
The Pyrenees (1879), Aberdeen Art Gallery

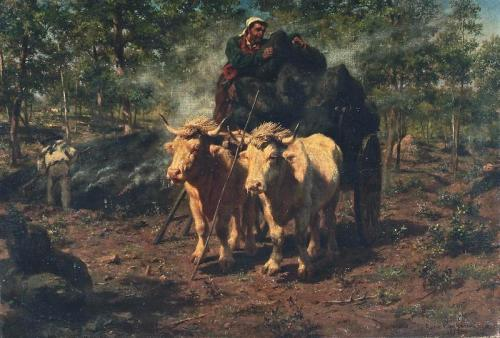
The Charcoal Burners (1853), Aberdeen Art Gallery

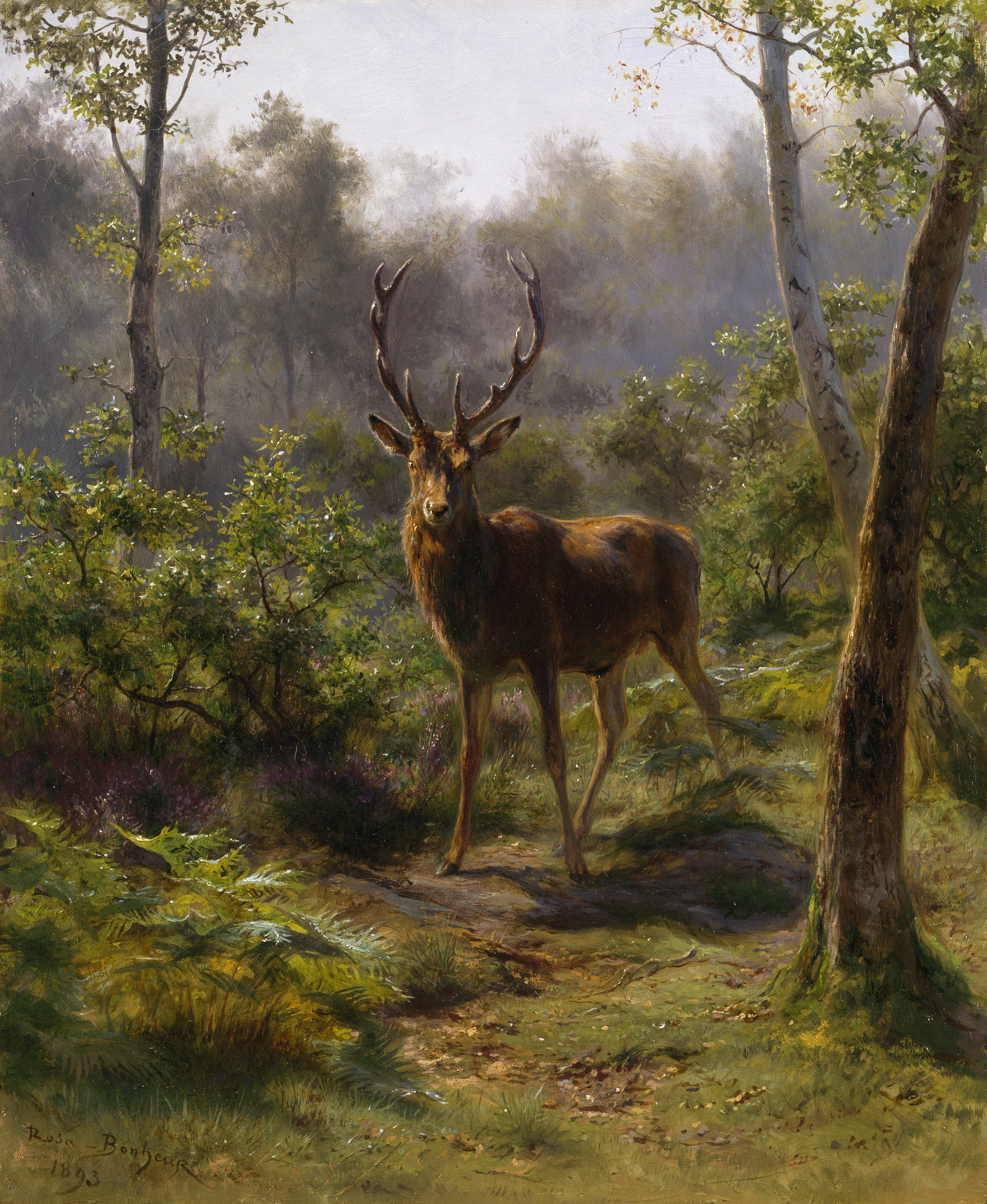
A Stag (1893), National Gallery of Ireland

== See also ==
- Rosa Bonheur Memorial Park
- Prix Rosa-Bonheur (Rosa Bonheur Prize)
- Women artists

== Resources ==
- NMWA.org Collection Profile - Bonheur article and artwork at NMWA.
