= Musée de l'atelier Rosa Bonheur =

Biographical museum in France

Coordinates: 48.3961°N 2.7832°E

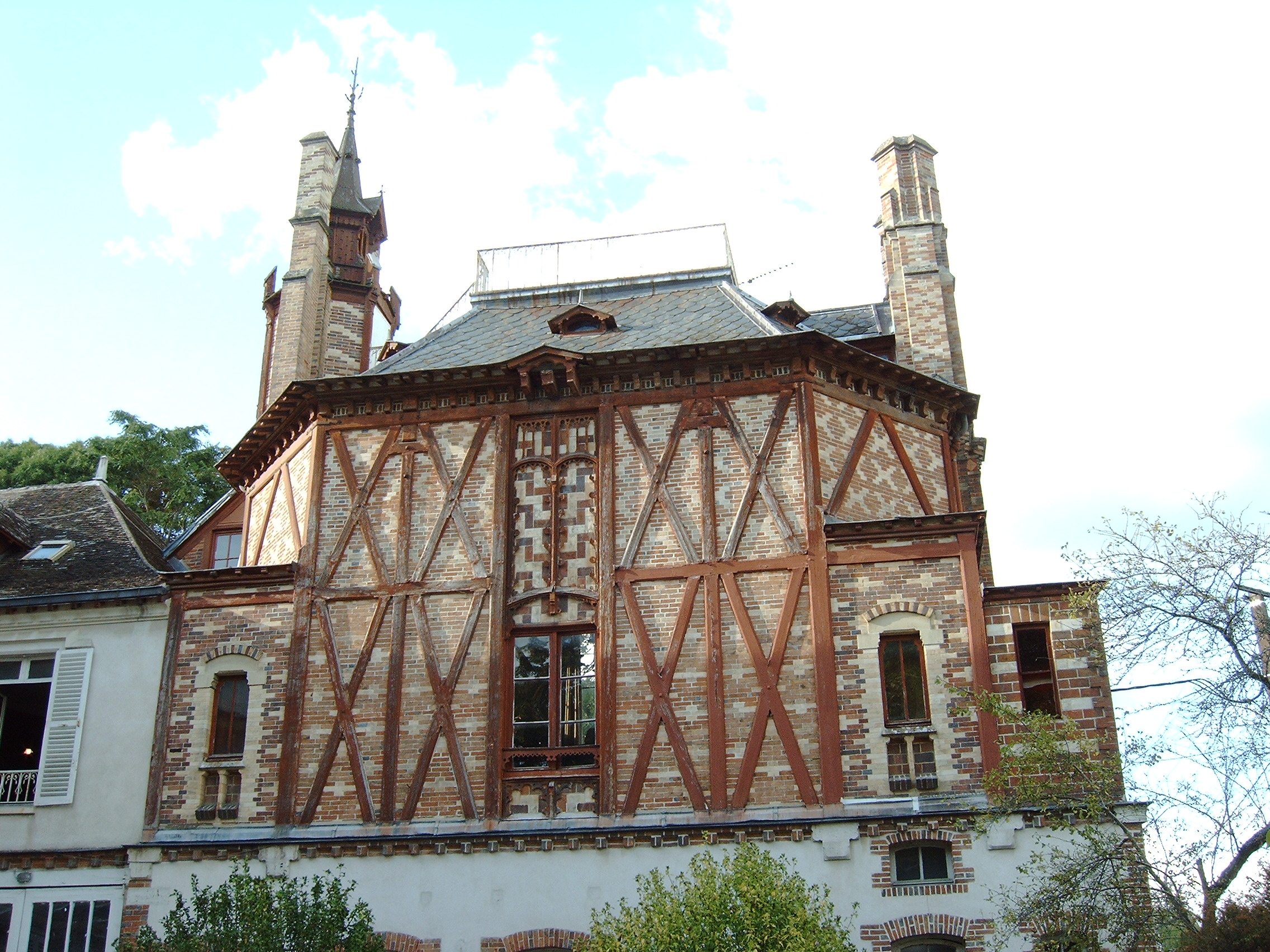
Musée de l'atelier Rosa Bonheur

The Château de By, otherwise the Musée de l'atelier Rosa Bonheur ("Museum of the Studio of Rosa Bonheur") is a museum run by a private owner, Katherine Brault, in the French department of Seine-et-Marne, on the edge of the Fontainebleau Forest. It is named after the former town of By, near Thomery. It was closed for refurbishment in 2016 but has since reopened by the Brault family in 2018.

== History ==
The building was purchased in 1859 by the French animal painter Rosa Bonheur, who moved her studio there. Aged 37, she was at the height of her popularity and made the building her home and studio for forty years, with pens for her animals in its park. She rebuilt the château to make it comfortable and to add a vast neo-Gothic studio room with the space and light she needed. It was in the château that Empress Eugenie presented her with her Légion d'Honneur in 1865.

The museum mainly consists of objects relating to Bonheur's everyday life (including a Native American costume given her by Buffalo Bill) and the building has remained unchanged since her death in 1899, other than the sale of all the paintings it once contained. It was put on the 'Maisons des Illustres' list in 2011, though the property around it was put on sale in summer 2014.

The property was purchased by Katherine Brault from the descendants of Anna Klumpke in September 2017. A bed and breakfast project is added to the museum. The museum-workshop and the building that houses it are among the 2019 winners benefiting from the heritage lottery.

== See also ==
- List of single-artist museums
