= Klumpke =

Klumpke may refer to:

== People ==
Klumpke sisters:

- Anna Elizabeth Klumpke (1856–1942), American portrait and genre painter
- Augusta Déjerine-Klumpke (1859–1927), American-born French physician
- Dorothea Klumpke-Roberts (1861–1942), American-born French astronomer
- Julia Klumpke (1870–1961), American violinist and composer

== Other ==
- Klumpke paralysis (or Klumpke's palsy or Dejerine-Klumpke palsy), brachial plexus palsy named for Augusta Déjerine-Klumpke
- Klumpke-Roberts Award, an award for outstanding contributions to public understanding and appreciation of astronomy
