= Sollier =

Sollier is a French surname. Notable people with the surname include:

- Alice Sollier (1861–1942), first Black French woman to qualify as a medical doctor
- Henri-Alexandre Sollier (1896–1966), French painter and illustrator
- Paul Sollier (1861–1933), French medical doctor and psychologist
- Paolo Sollier (born 1948), Italian football player and coach
- Simon Sollier (1890–1955), French football player
