= Eugène Poubelle =

French lawyer, introduced waste containers to Paris

Eugène-René Poubelle
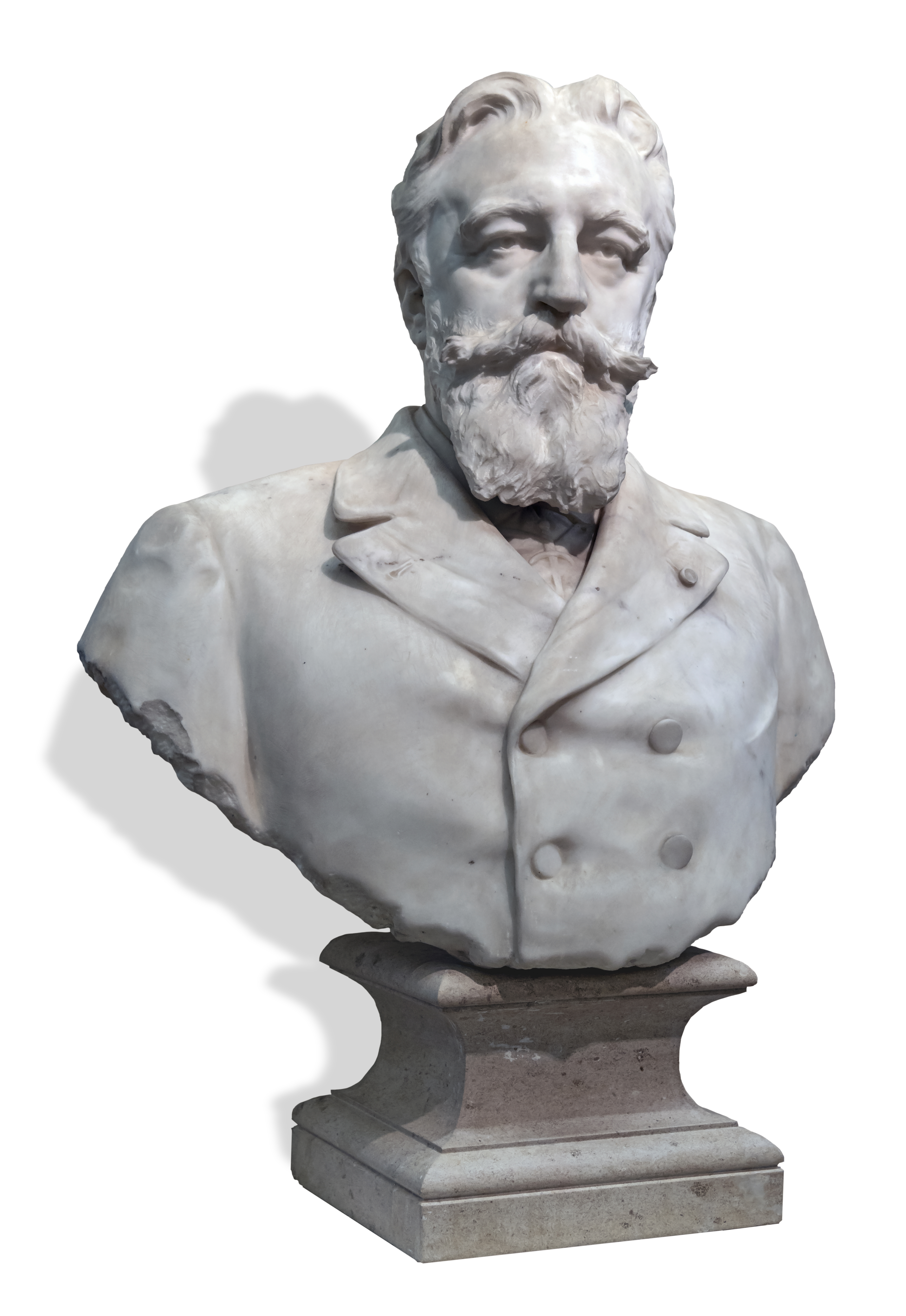
- Poubelle by Denys Puech
- Born: 15 April 1831; Caen, France
- Died: 15 July 1907 (aged 76); Paris, France
- Resting place: Carcassonne, France
- Occupations: Lawyer, University lecturer, Préfet (President's Representative), Regional Administrator
- Known for: Introducing dustbin / 'La Poubelle' to France

Eugène-René Poubelle (French pronunciation: [øʒɛn ʁəne pubɛl]; 15 April 1831 – 15 July 1907) was a French lawyer and diplomat who introduced waste containers to Paris and made their use compulsory. This introduction was so innovative at the time that Poubelle's surname became synonymous with waste bins (la poubelle) and remains the most common French word for a trash can.

== Biography ==
Eugène Poubelle was born to a bourgeois family in Caen. He studied to become a lawyer and obtained a PhD. He taught at universities in Caen, Grenoble and Toulouse before being made préfet, or government representative and regional administrator, in the Charente in April 1871. He then successively became préfet for Isère, Corsica, Doubs, Bouches-du-Rhône and finally, from 1883 to 1896, for the Seine département.

Préfet of the Seine was a very powerful position, and the préfet effectively exercised in Paris the powers that the elected mayor would have had in other French cities. On 7 March 1884 Poubelle decreed that owners of buildings must provide their residents with three covered containers of 40 to 120 litres to hold household refuse. The refuse was to be sorted into compostable items, paper and cloth, and crockery and shells.

The population of Paris, close to two million, needed a system to empty the containers regularly. Parisians began to name their boxes after Poubelle, a habit encouraged by the newspaper Le Figaro, which called them Boîtes Poubelle. The boxes met resistance, owners of buildings resenting the cost of providing and supervising the bins, and traditional rag-and-bone men, the chiffonniers, seeing a threat to their living.

The boxes deteriorated but the principles of what Poubelle established survived. But not until the end of the Second World War did dustbins and their collection by municipalities become common. By then poubelle as a noun had been established, and was first recognised by a supplement of the Grand Dictionnaire Universel du 19ème Siècle in 1890.

Eugène Poubelle also campaigned successfully for direct drainage. A resurgence of cholera in 1892 led to his decreeing in 1894 that all buildings were to be connected direct to the sewers at the expense of the building's owner.

In July 1885, Poubelle took a stance against the male medical community and decreed that Blanche Edwards-Pilliet could apply to become an Internat des hôpitaux de Paris. She had taken her case to the Paris municipal council in the face of a petition against her, signed by 90 male students and doctors. Poubelle's ruling opened the door to medical training in a hospital setting for French women, with Augusta Déjerine-Klumpke becoming the first woman Internat des hôpitaux de Paris in 1886.

== Later career ==
Poubelle became ambassador to the Vatican in 1896 and to the Roman court in 1898. He was consul general of the canton of Saissac in the Aude from 1898 to 1904, and president of the Société Centrale d'Agriculture de l'Aude, where he defended the interests of wine in Southern France, also called "Le Midi" by the French.

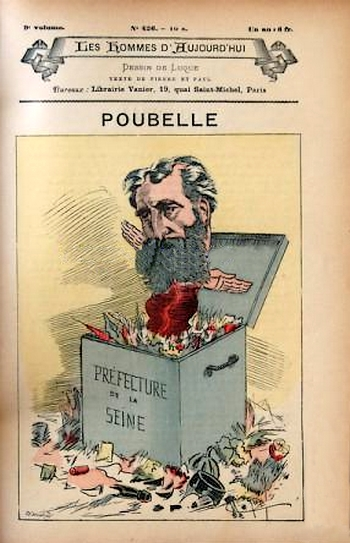
Caricature of Poubelle, by Manuel Luque

== Death and commemoration ==
Poubelle died in Paris on 15 July 1907 and is buried in the Herminis cemetery near Carcassonne; a bust depicting him is displayed outside the city's Musée des Beaux-Arts. Rue Eugène Poubelle, a street between the Avenue de Versailles and the Quai Louis-Blériot in Paris's 16th arrondissement, is named after him.

On 15 April 2021 Google celebrated his 190th birthday with a Google Doodle.

== See also ==
- History of waste management
