= Louis Théophile Joseph Landouzy =

French neurologist (1845–1917)

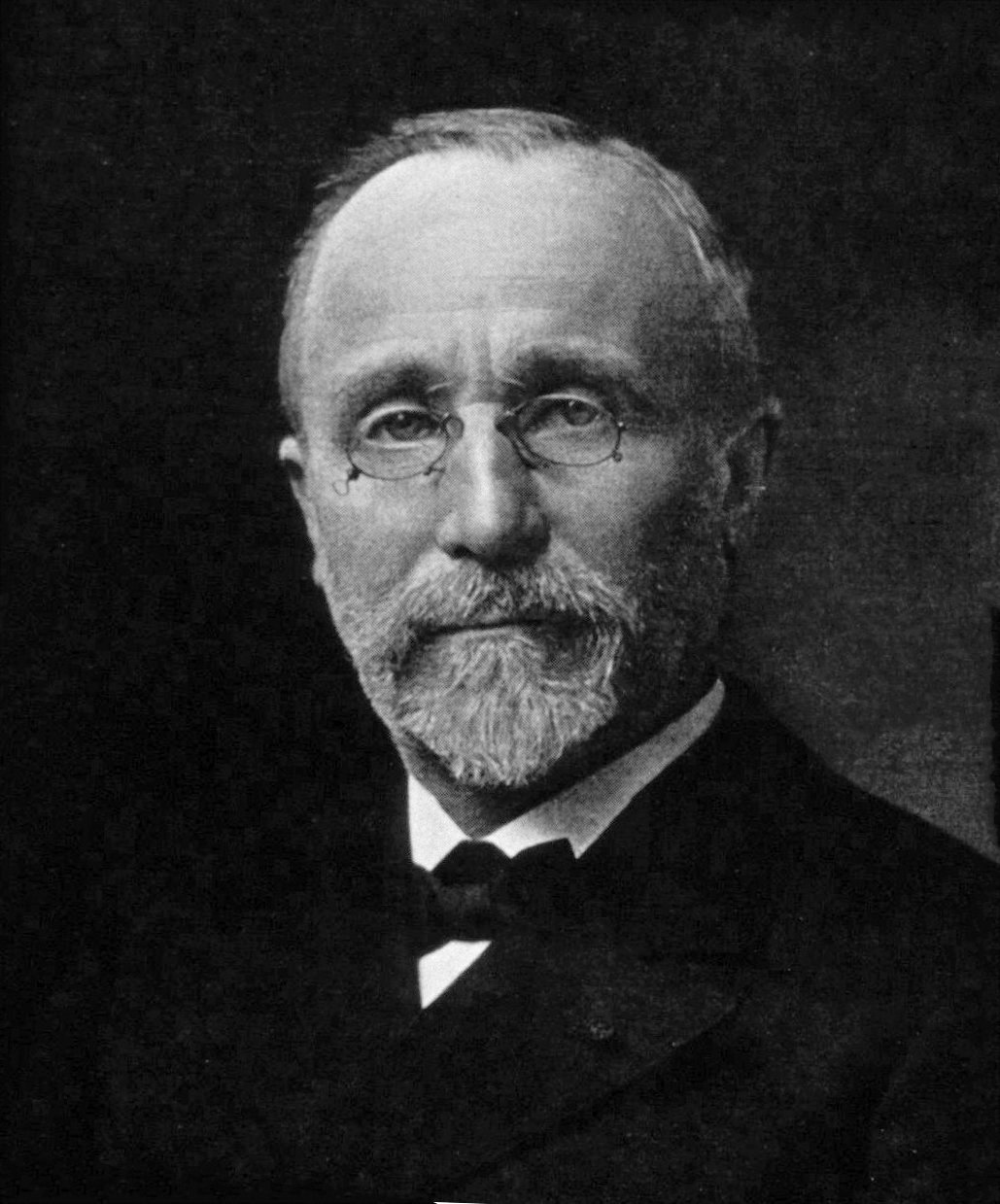
Louis Landouzy

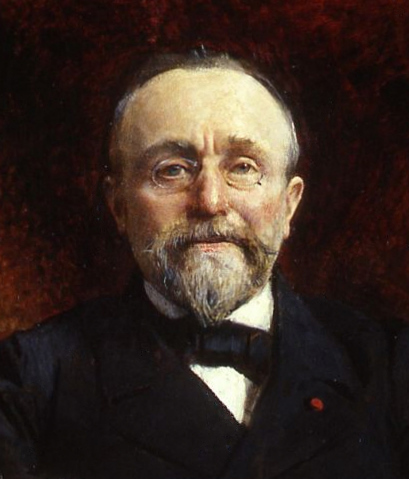
Louis Landouzy by Léon Bonnat

Louis Théophile Joseph Landouzy (27 March 1845 – 10 May 1917) was a French neurologist from Reims, and whose father and grandfather were also physicians.

He studied medicine in Reims and Paris, earning his doctorate in 1876. He spent much his career at the University of Paris, becoming a professor of therapy in 1893 and a dean of medicine in 1901.

His name is associated with the "Landouzy-Dejerine syndrome", a type of muscular dystrophy with atrophic changes to the facial muscles and scapulo-humeral region. It is named along with neurologist Joseph Jules Dejerine, who was a colleague and close friend. Landouzy was a witness at the wedding of Dejerine to Augusta Marie Klumpke (1859–1927) in 1888.

Landouzy's primary area of interest dealt with tuberculosis, and he was a major figure involving education of the public for its eradication. He was a member of several international committees in regards to tuberculosis.

He is credited with coining the word "camptodactyly" to describe a flexion deformity of the finger(s) at the proximal interphalangeal joint (1906). With neurologist Joseph Grasset (1849–1918), his name is associated with the "Landouzy-Grasset Law". This law states that in lesions concerning one hemisphere of the brain, a patient will turn his head to the side of affected muscles if there is spasticity, and to the side of the cerebral lesion if there is paralysis.

== Sources ==
- "Louis Landouzy". Who Named It. Archived from the original on March 1, 2002.
