= Yvonne Sorrel-Dejerine =

French neurologist (1891–1986)

Yvonne Sorrel-Dejerine (25 May 1891 in Paris – 26 July 1986) was a French neurologist.

== Life and work ==
Yvonne was the daughter of Jules Déjerine (1849–1917) and Augusta Déjerine-Klumpke (1859–1927), both neurologists. After her secondary education at Collège Sévigné, she obtained a degree in Natural Sciences from the Sorbonne, followed by the PCN (Certificate of physical, chemical and biological studies), enabling her to study medicine. Sorrel-Dejerine published her doctorate thesis on tuberculous paraplegias in 1925.

After completing her externship, including a semester spent in her father's neurology department at the Pitié-Salpêtrière Hospital, she passed the competitive examination for the internship at Paris hospitals in 1921.

On 13 April 1921, she married surgeon Étienne Sorrel, head of the department at the Assistance Public Hospital in Berck, France. Working as an intern in the Berck maritime hospital, Dr. Sorrel-Dejerine had the opportunity to observe numerous cases of vertebral bone tuberculosis of the child. In a publication from 1926, her work with certain spinal cord rehabilitations is described thusly:

"With regard to treatment, Madame Sorrel-Dejerine insists that complete fixation in a recumbent position is essential, and unhesitatingly condemns the "ambulatory" treatment with spinal jackets. Operative treatment is also condemned as unnecessary and ineffective, and indeed her experience in these 44 cases is so good as amply to justify the attitude which she adopts in this respect."

She was awarded the Lallemand Prize from the Academy of Sciences for her work titled "Contribution a l'etude des paraplegies pottiques" in 1926.

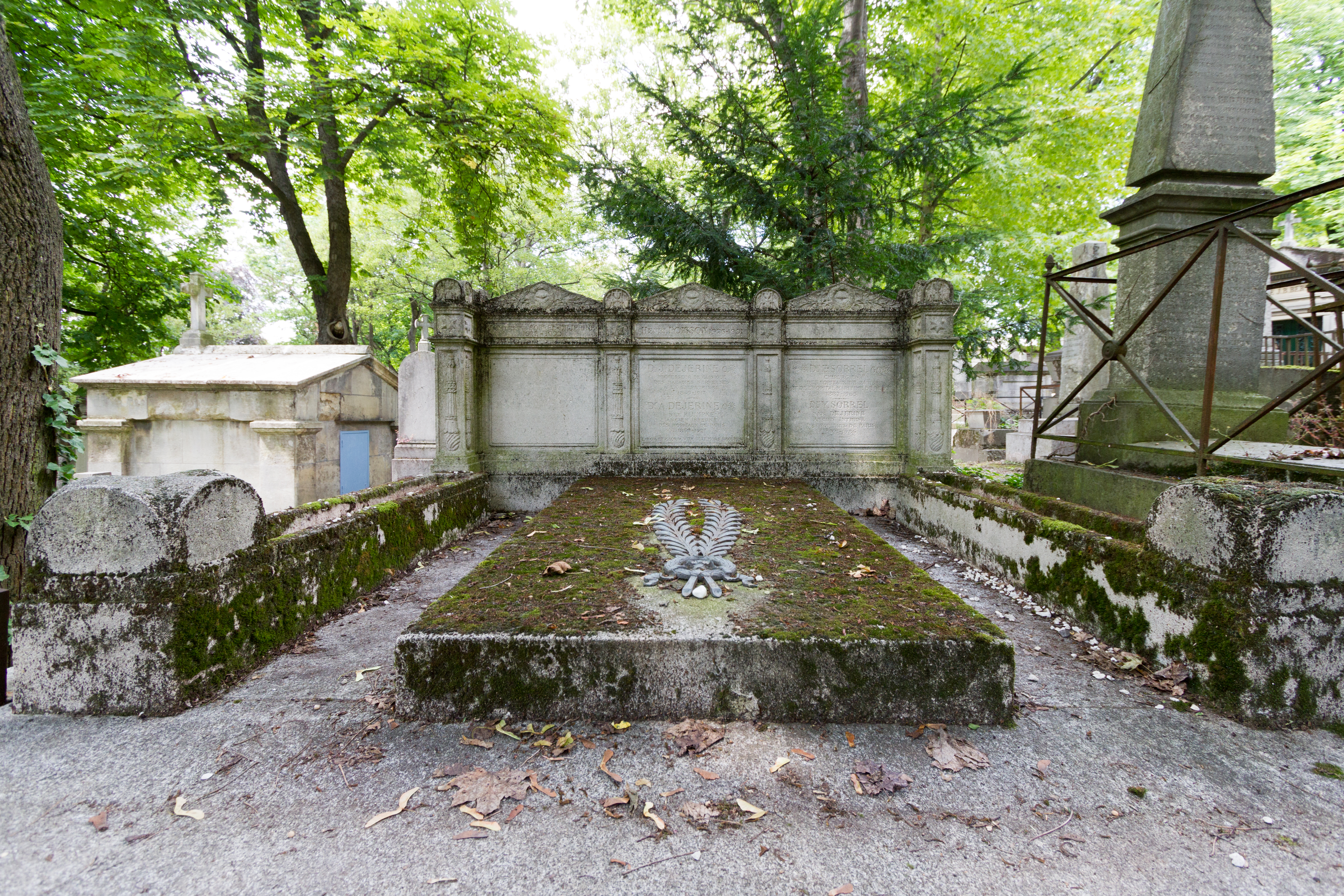
Burial site in Père Lachaise Cemetery of Jules Dejerine (1849–1917), neurologist; his wife Augusta Dejerine-Klumpke, (1859–1927), neurologist, first female internist at the Paris Hospitals; Étienne Sorrel (1882–1965), doctor of medicine, surgeon at the Paris Hospitals; his wife Yvonne Sorrel-Dejerine (1891–1986), doctor of medicine, vice-president of the Paris Neurology Society.

=== Final years ===
Yvonne Sorrel-Dejerine died at the age of 95, on 26 July 1986, at the Dejerine family chalet in Switzerland, which was originally owned by her parents and named Le Neurone at the Thalgut. It sat on the banks of the Aar river in the municipality of Gerzensee, not far from Wichtrach in the canton of Bern.

== Archives ==
Yvonne Sorrel-Dejerine and her mother Augusta Dejerine-Klumpke, created a fund to maintain Dejerine-Klumpke's collection and established The Dejerine Foundation in 1920, dedicated to the preservation of the Dejerine legacy, and fostering neurological research and education.

== Awards and honours ==
- Member of the Société Française de Chirurgie orthopédique et traumatologique (1925)
- Member of the Société Française de Neurologie (1926), President in 1952
- Member of the American Trudeau Society (1949), for tuberculosis control
- Honorary member of the American Academy of Neurology (1950)
- General Secretary of the Association of Women Physicians
- Medal of the City of Paris (1975)
