= Vulpian–Heidenhain–Sherrington phenomenon =

Term used for slow contraction of denervated skeletal muscle

Vulpian–Heidenhain–Sherrington phenomenon is a term given for slow contraction of denervated skeletal muscle by stimulating the autonomic cholinergic fibers innervating its blood vessels. It is named after French neurologist Alfred Vulpian (1826–87), German physiologist Rudolf Heidenhain (1834–1897) and English neurophysiologist Charles Scott Sherrington (1857–1952).
