= Joseph Jules Dejerine =

French neurologist (1849–1917)

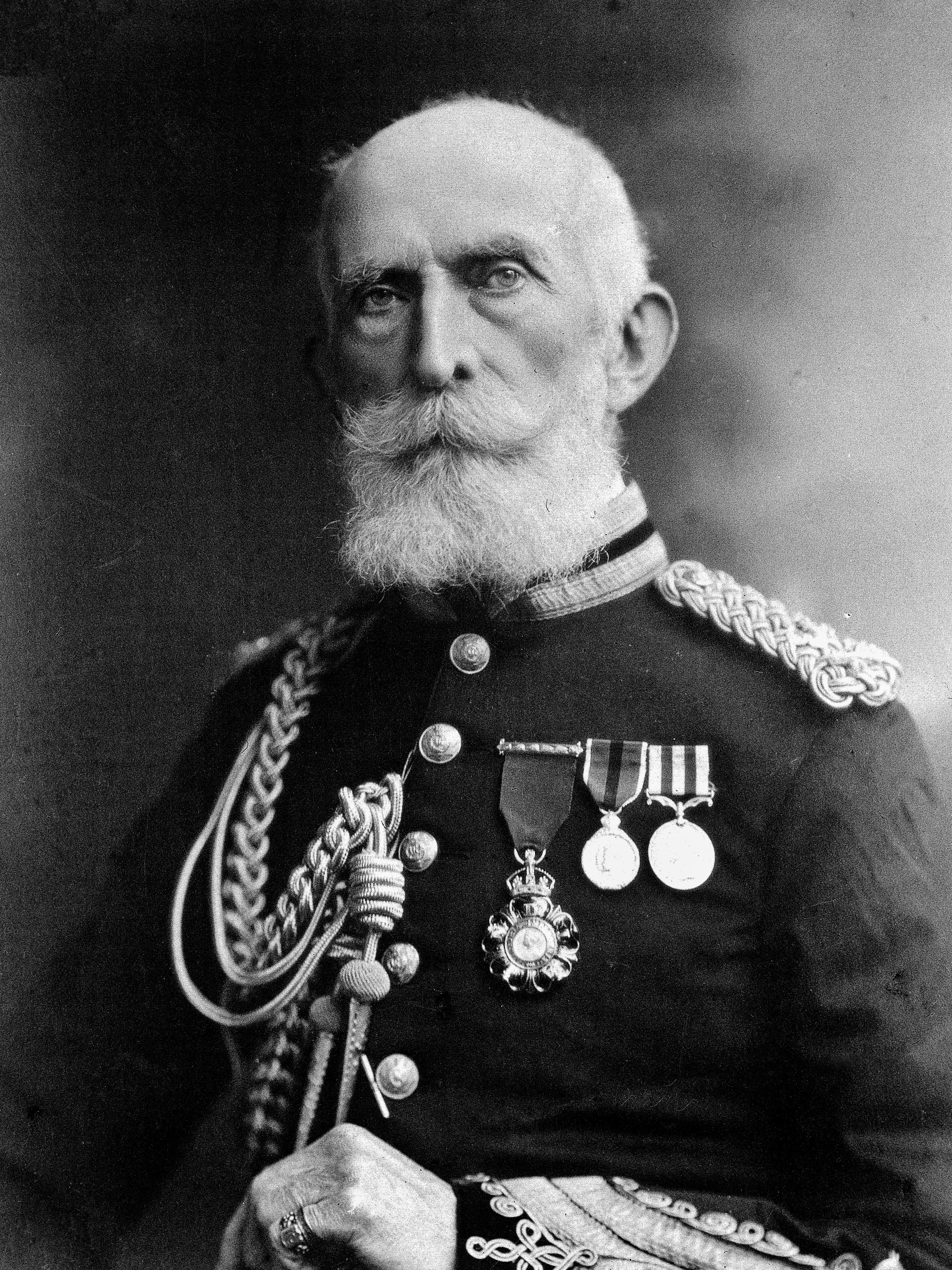
Joseph Jules Dejerine

Joseph Jules Dejerine (3 August 1849 – 26 February 1917) was a French neurologist.

== Early life and education ==
Dejerine was born to French parents in Geneva, Switzerland, where his father was a carriage proprietor. During the Franco-Prussian War (1870) Dejerine worked as a volunteer in a Geneva Hospital and in the spring of 1871 decided to pursue his medicine studies in Paris. In France, he was introduced to and subsequently became a pupil of Alfred Vulpian, a notable neurologist.

== Career ==
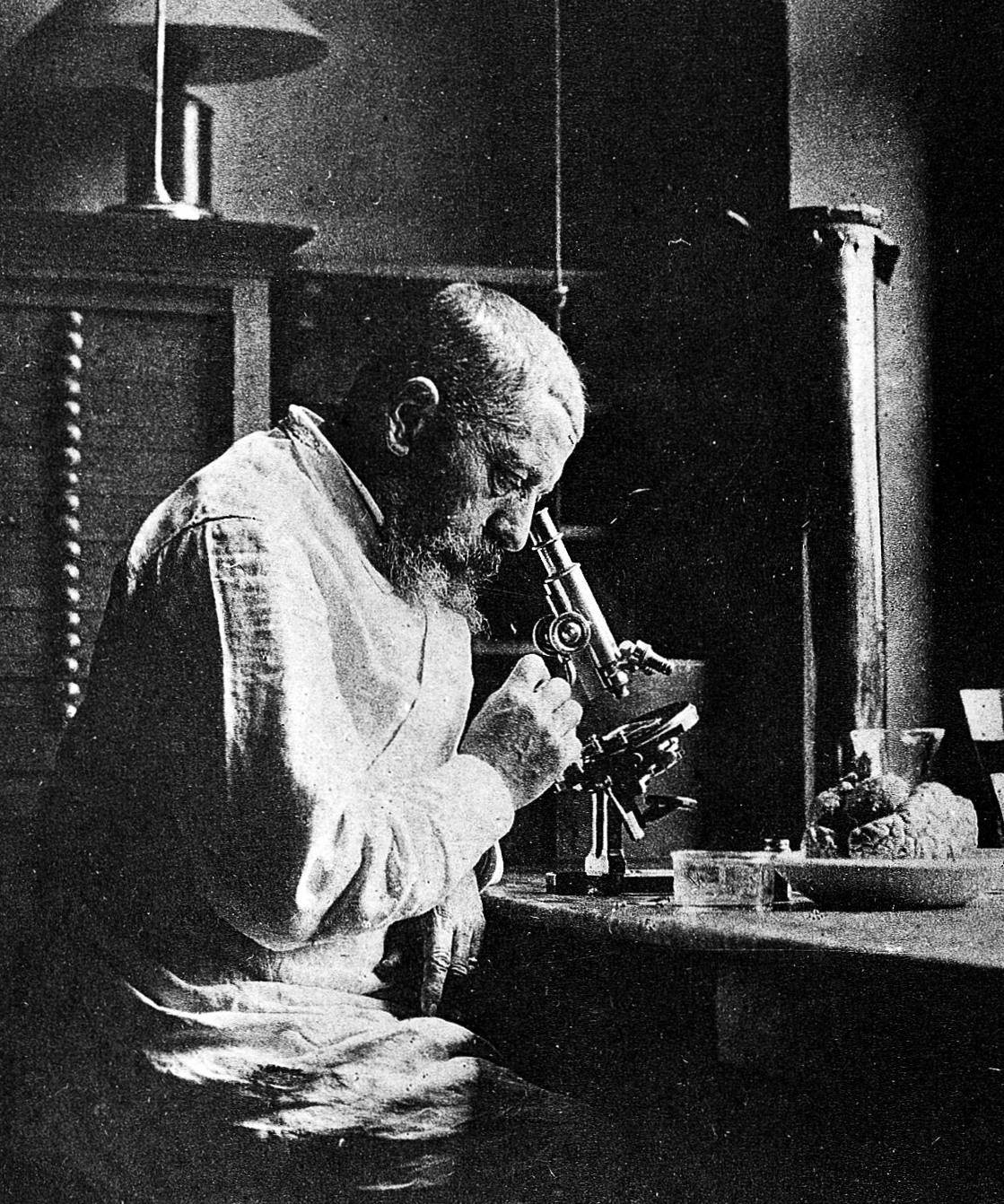
Dejerine, c. 1915

In 1877, Dejerine was appointed to the Hôpital Bicêtre, where he organized a pathological laboratory. He became professeur agrégé in 1886, and he found the opportunity to concentrate his efforts on neurology. He worked at the Hôpital Salpêtrière from 1895, became professor of the history of medicine in 1901 and received a senior appointment at the Salpêtrière in 1911 as professor of neurology at the University of Paris, School of Medicine.

== Personal life ==
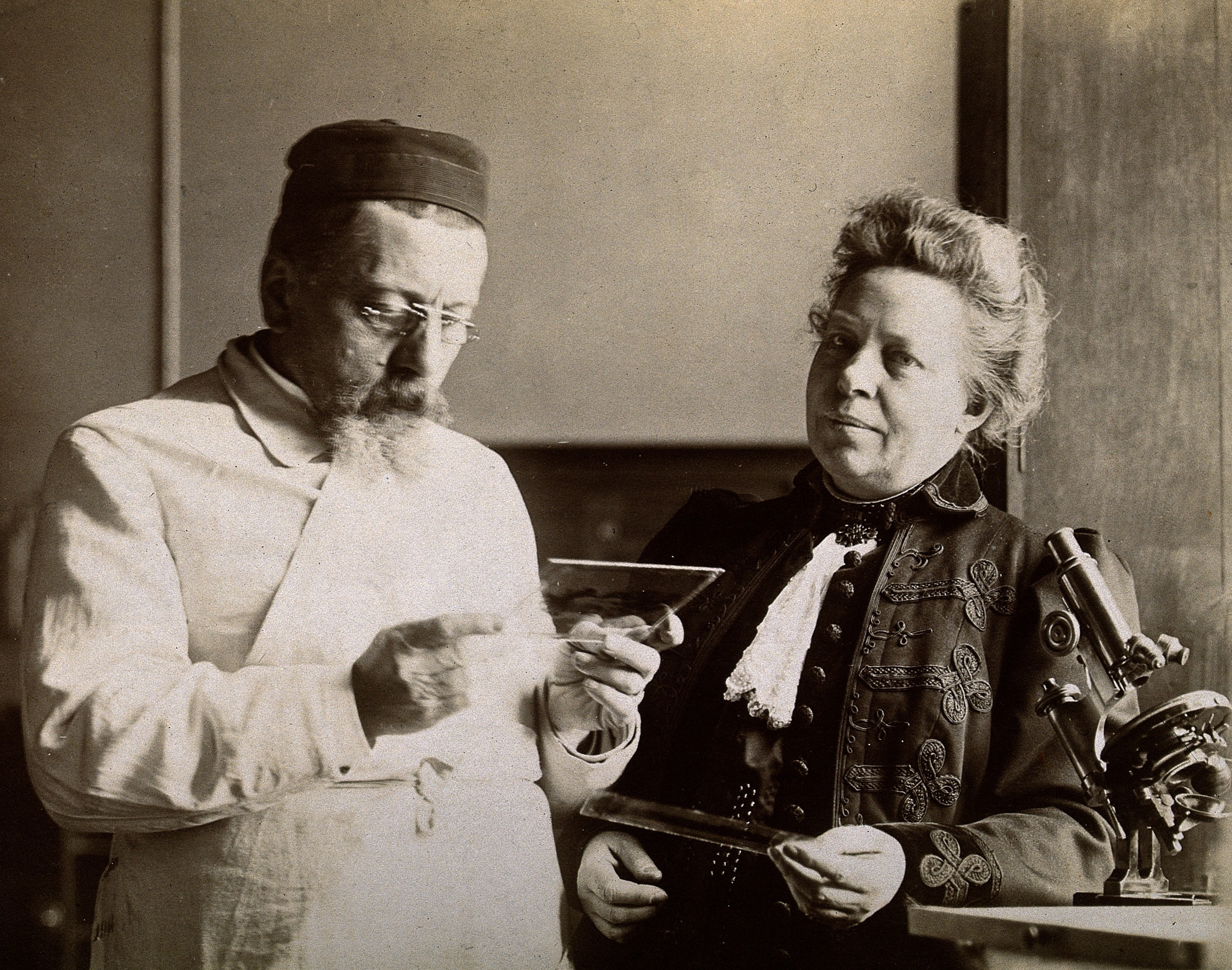
Dejerine and his wife, Augusta Déjerine-Klumpke

In 1888, Dejerine married Augusta Déjerine-Klumpke, his student, who had studied medicine in Paris; in 1887, she was the first woman named an interne des hôpitaux.

== Death ==
Dejerine became physically debilitated by the stress of work in a military hospital during the World War I. He died in 1917 of uremia at age 68.

== Legacy ==
The centenary of his birth was commemorated in 1949 at the fourth International Neurological Congress in Paris, when Dejerine's pupil, André Thomas, gave a discourse on his mentor's life and achievements.

Dejerine was one of the pioneers in the study of localisation of function in the brain, having first shown that pure alexia may occur as the result of lesions of the supramarginal and angular gyri. He also studied the pathology of thalamic syndrome.

Dejerine's numerous publications span a period of more than 40 years. Like many eminent neurologists of his era, Dejerine became interested in psychology in the later stages of his career and he is remembered as a proponent of the view that the personality of the psychotherapist is crucial in any interaction with the patient.

- He once said, "In man, emotion is almost everything and reason very little."

=== Associated eponyms ===
- Dejerine's "onion-peel sensory loss": Sensory loss starting from mouth and nose and extending concentrically outward observed in lesions of the trigeminal nucleus.
- Dejerine's cortical sensory syndrome: Loss of proprioception and stereognosis with retention of touch, pain, temperature and vibration seen in parietal lobe lesion.
- Dejerine-Mouzon syndrome: Another parietal lobe syndrome with severe impairment of the primary modalities of sensation (pain, thermal, tactile, and vibratory sense).
- Dejerine syndrome: Alternating hypoglossal hemiplegia syndrome seen in neurovascular bulbar lesions. In English-speaking countries, this alternating syndrome is better known as Jackson's syndrome after John Hughlings Jackson (1835 - 1911).
- Dejerine syndrome can also refer to pure alexia.
- Dejerine-Klumpke paralysis: Lower brachial plexus paralysis occurring during birth, particularly with breech deliveries; this is actually named after Augusta Dejerine-Klumpke.
- Dejerine-Roussy syndrome: Syndrome due to lesions of the posterior thalamus. Named along with French physician Gustave Roussy (1874–1948).
- Dejerine-Sottas disease: A slowly progressive hereditary form of hypertrophic neuropathy characterised by motor and sensory disturbance in the limbs commencing in childhood or adolescence. Named along with French neurologist Jules Sottas (1866–1945).
- Dejerine-Thomas olivopontocerebellar atrophy: A sporadically occurring form of chronic progressive ataxia.
- Landouzy-Dejerine syndrome: A hereditary form of slowly progressive muscular dystrophy involving primarily the musculature of the shoulders and face, with pattern of inheritance autosomal dominant. Named along with French physician Louis Théophile Joseph Landouzy (1845–1917).

== Bibliography ==
- Recherches sur les lésions du système nerveux dans la paralysie ascendante aiguë. Paris, 1879
- L'héredité dans les maladies du système nerveux. Paris, 1886
- Anatomie des centres nerveux, with Augusta Marie Dejerine-Klumpke. 2 volumes, Paris, 1895 and 1901
- Traité des maladies de la moëlle épinière, with André Thomas. Paris, 1902
- Sémiologie des affections du système nerveux, with Augusta Marie Dejerine-Klumpke. Paris, 1914
