= Dorothea Klumpke =

American astronomer (1861–1942)

Dorothea Klumpke Roberts
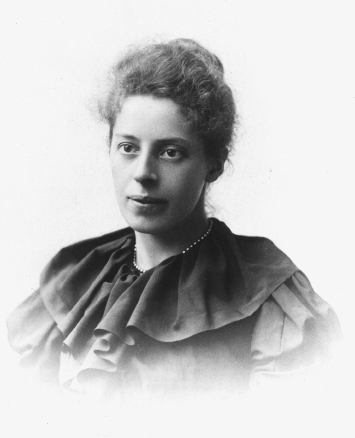
- Born: August 9, 1861; San Francisco, California, United States
- Died: October 5, 1942 (aged 81); San Francisco, California, United States
- Education: Sorbonne University
- Spouse: Isaac Roberts (m. 1901–1904)
- Relatives: Anna Elizabeth, Julia, Augusta (sisters)
- Awards: Officier d'Académie of the French Academy of Sciences; Chevalier de la Légion d'Honneur
- Scientific career
- Fields: Astronomy
- Institutions: Paris Observatory
- Thesis: Contribution à l'étude des anneaux de Saturne (1893)

Dorothea Klumpke Roberts (August 9, 1861 – October 5, 1942 ) was an American astronomer. In 1893, she became the first woman to earn a doctorate degree at the Sorbonne University. She joined the Paris Observatory where her work consisted of measuring star positions, processing astrophotographs, and studying stellar spectra and meteorites. She was later appointed director of the observatory's Bureau of Measurements, a position she held for ten years. She married the amateur astronomer Isaac Roberts in 1901 and left the observatory to help him photograph all 52 of William Herschel's "areas of nebulosity". Following his death, she compiled and published a catalogue of his work. In 1934, Klumpke was honored by the French president as a knight of the Legion of Honor.

== Early life and education ==
Dorothea Klumpke was born on August 9, 1861 in San Francisco to Dorothea Mathilda (née Tolle) and John Gerard Klumpke (1825–1917). Her father was a German immigrant who came to California in 1850 with the Gold Rush and later became a successful realtor in San Francisco. Her parents married in 1855, and had five daughters and two sons. Klumpke's sisters included Anna Elizabeth, painter and companion to the French animal painter Rosa Bonheur; Julia, a violinist and composer; Mathilda, an accomplished pianist and pupil of Antoine François Marmontel; and the neurologist Augusta, who, with her physician husband, Joseph Jules Dejerine, established a clinic and wrote numerous papers. The Klumpkes divorced when Dorothea was in her teens, and her mother took her and her siblings to live and study in Europe.

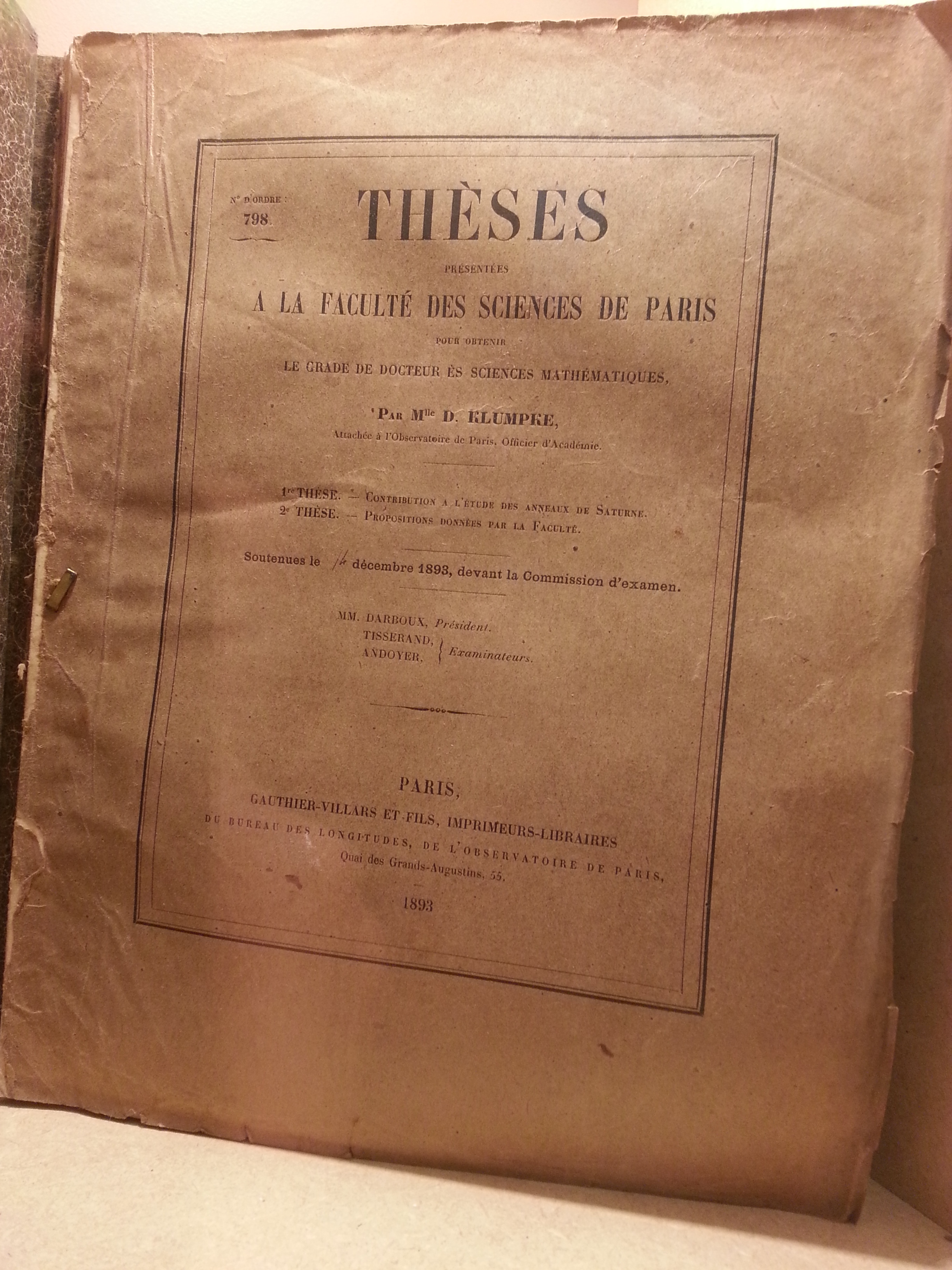
Theses submitted to the Faculty of Sciences of Paris for the degree of Doctor of Mathematical Sciences by Dorothea Klumpke

In 1877, Klumpke moved to Paris, France, while her four sisters attended schools in Germany and Switzerland. She studied at the University of Paris. She began by studying music, but later turned to astronomy. She earned her bachelor's degree in 1886 and her PhD in 1893, with her dissertation focusing on the rings of Saturn. In 1887, she began working at the Paris Observatory alongside Guillaume Bigourdan and Lipót Schulhof, and later astrophotographers Paul and Prosper Henry. Her work consisted of measuring star positions, processing astrophotographs, and studying stellar spectra and meteorites.

On December 14, 1893, she read her doctoral thesis, L'étude des Anneaux de Saturne to a large audience of academics at the Sorbonne, and was awarded the degree of Docteur ès Sciences; the first woman to do so. Her main subjects were mathematics and mathematical astronomy. The examining committee, composed of Jean Gaston Darboux, Félix Tisserand and Marie Henri Andoyer, were unanimous in their praise. By contrast, Harvard awarded its first doctorate in astronomy to Cecilia Payne-Gaposchkin in 1925.

== Career ==
In 1886, Sir David Gill proposed an atlas of the heavens. The idea received enthusiastic support, especially from the Director of the Paris Observatory, Admiral Amédée Mouchez, who suggested an international meeting in Paris. This led to the Carte du Ciel project, which required photographing the entire sky and showing stars as faint as the 14th magnitude. The Paris Observatory was to do a major portion of the sky as its contribution. It was also envisioned that a catalogue of all the stars to the 11th magnitude be drawn up.

In 1981, Klumpke was appointed the Director of the Bureau of Measurements (Bureau des Mesures) at the Paris Observatory, the only woman among 50 candidates for the post. She held the position for a decade. She supervised several other women scientists during this time.

In 1896, she sailed to Norway on the Norwegian vessel Norse King, to observe the solar eclipse of August 9, 1896. There, she became acquainted with Dr. Isaac Roberts, a 67-year-old Welsh widower, entrepreneur, and astronomer, who had become a pioneer in astrophotography. He had also attended the Paris Carte du Ciel Congress.

In 1899, astronomers had predicted a great meteor shower now known as the Leonids. The French chose Klumpke to be the one to ride in a balloon to observe the shower. The shower turned out to be a complete failure.

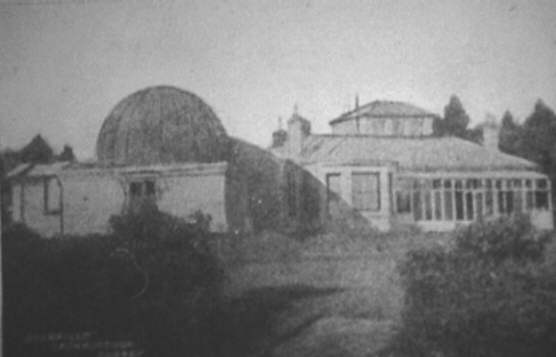
The Roberts's observatory at their home in Crowborough, Sussex taken from A Selection of Photographs of Stars, Star-clusters and Nebulae

In 1901, Dorothea Klumpke and Isaac Roberts were married and moved to his home Starfield in Crowborough, Sussex, England. Roberts left her job at the Paris Observatory to be with her husband, whom she assisted in a project to photograph all 52 of William Herschel's "areas of nebulosity." Their marriage lasted until Isaac's death in 1904. Roberts inherited all his astronomical effects and a considerable fortune. She commissioned him a gravestone for her husband which featured images of his astronomical work.

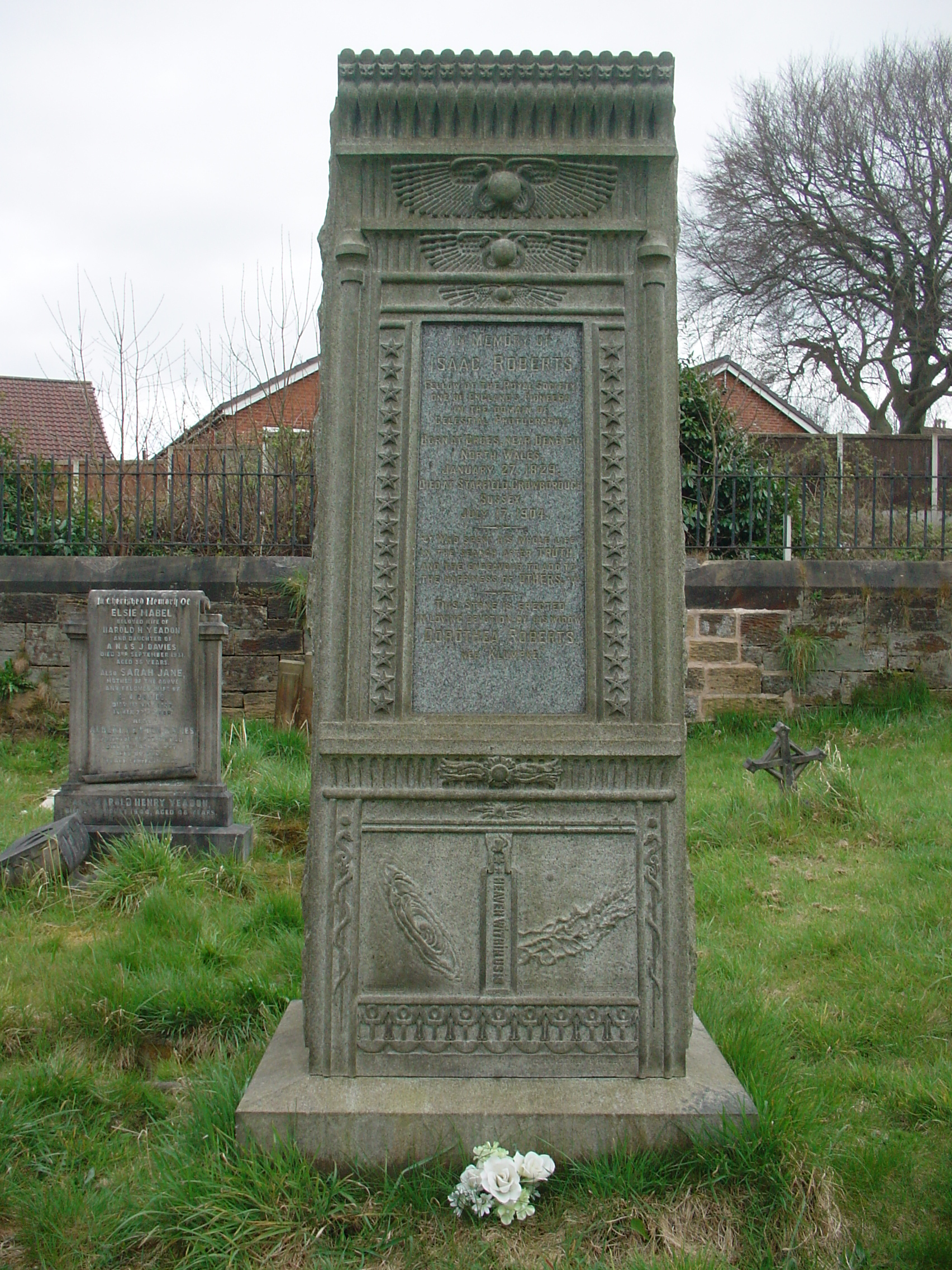
Tomb of Isaac Roberts in Flaybrick Hill Cemetery, Birkenhead, Merseyside

Dorothea Roberts remained at the Sussex home and completed her photography of the 52 areas, after which she went to stay with her mother and sister Anna Elizabeth at Château Rosa Bonheur, taking along the entire set of photographic plates. She returned to Paris Observatory and spent 25 years processing the plates and her husband’s notes, periodically publishing papers on the results. In 1929, she published a comprehensive catalogue of the survey The Isaac Roberts Atlas of 52 Regions, a Guide to William Herschel's Fields of Nebulosity.

Through a donation of Roberts in honor of her late husband, the Société astronomique de France (the French Astronomical Society) established the Klumpke-Roberts Award for the encouragement of the study of the wide and diffuse nebulae of William Herschel, the obscure objects of Edward Emerson Barnard, or the cosmic clouds of Johann Georg Hagen. This biennial prize was first given in 1931 and is still awarded today.

Shortly after being knighted in the Legion of Honour in 1934, she and her sister Anna Elizabeth moved to San Francisco where she spent the rest of her days. She made endowments to the Paris Observatory, the Astronomical Society of the Pacific, and the University of California to be granted to aspiring astronomers.

Dorothea Klumpke Roberts died on October 5, 1942, having been in poor health for a number of years.

== Honours and awards ==
She was the first recipient of the "Prix de Dames" from the Société astronomique de France in 1889, and in 1893 was honored as an Officier d'Académe of the French Academy of Sciences. This was the first time a woman had been so honored.

She was awarded the Hèléne-Paul Helbronner prize (named after Paul Helbronner and his wife) in 1932 from the French Academy of Sciences for her 1929 book, The Isaac Roberts Atlas of 52 Regions, a Guide to William Herschel's Fields of Nebulosity.

On February 22, 1934, she was elected a Chevalière de la Légion d'Honneur with the French President presenting the Cross.

Asteroids 339 Dorothea and 1040 Klumpkea were named in her honour, as is the Klumpke-Roberts Award of the Astronomical Society of the Pacific.

In 2026, Dorothea Klumpke and her sister Augusta were announced as part of the 72 historical women in STEM whose names were proposed to be added to the 72 men already celebrated on the Eiffel Tower. The plan was conceived by a student and tour guide named Bernard Rigaud and it was announced by the Mayor of Paris, Anne Hidalgo following the recommendations of a committee led by Isabelle Vauglin of Femmes et Sciences and Jean-François Martins, representing the operating company which runs the Eiffel Tower.

== Views about Mars ==
Klumpke reported a strange signal from Mars to a newspaper:

The body of Mars is not very luminous, and the eye has to be trained. Imagination must not be permitted to carry the eye away. The astronomers at Arizona Observatory are very advanced, and imagination may have played a part, though Mars should be the first planet with which we shall be able to communicate. Mars will be the first to give us true knowledge of life beyond the earth, as it was the first to lead Keppler to the truth about the solar system. The projections are astronomical phenomena, not signals from the inhabitants. Mars is doubtless inhabited by a superior race, and I see probability in Kant's theory that we may be transmitted to another planet for another life.

— D. Klumpke, The Kalispell bee (Kalispell, Mont.), January 17, 1901,

== Publications ==
- Bureau of Measurements of the Paris Observatory
- Contribution à l'étude des anneaux de Saturne
- Les catalogues stellaires
- Eléments définitifs de la comète 1885 III
- Notes du voyage relatif à l'éclipse totale de soleil (9 août 1896)
- La femme dans l´astronomie
- Adieux de Mlle Klumpke: membre du consel de la Société astronomique de France
- Nouvelles mesures de la distance de la Terre au Soleil
- La Nébuleuse spirale Messier 51 Canum Venaticorum
- The H.V. 16 Andromedæ and the stars and nebulous knots in its vicinity
- Notes on the nebula H.I.159 Cassiopeiæ
- On suspected faint nebulosities in the outer regions of M. 57 Lyrae
- The nebula H.IV. 69 Tauri, N.G.C. 1514, and the fainter nebulæ, N.G.C. 821–2655–2782–2787–2830–2859–2880
- The region of H I 79 Ursae majoris
- The Nebula H.V. 25 CETI
- The nebula H II. 78 Leonis
- Woman's work in Astronomy
- Observations d'étoiles variables à longues périodes
- Isaac Robert's Atlas of 52 regions, a guide to Herschel's fields
- Sir William Herschel's 52 extensive diffused nebulosities

== See also ==
- Timeline of women in science
