= Blanche Edwards-Pilliet =

French physician (1858–1941)

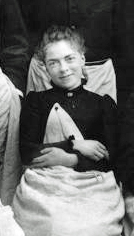
- Blanche Edwards-Pilliet, 1888
- Born: 1858
- Died: 1941 (aged 82–83)
- Scientific career
- Fields: Physician

Blanche Edwards-Pilliet (1858–1941) was a French physician, medical teacher, and leading social reformer for women. She, along with Augusta Déjerine-Klumpke, was one of the first women to intern at a hospital in Paris.

== Early life ==
Edwards-Pilliet was home-schooled by her well-educated British father, Doctor George Hugh Edwards. She grew up speaking both French and English and learning mathematics, science, and the classics. After taking the baccalauréat-ès-lettres in 1877 and the baccalauréat-ès-sciences in 1878, she was able to enroll in the faculty of medicine in Paris at the age of 19.

== Career and later life ==
In 1885, when Edwards-Pilliet applied to be a hospital intern, over 90 doctors and interns signed a petition against it because she was a woman. However, the Paris municipal council allowed her case to be heard. On 31 July French lawyer Eugène Poubelle signed her case, allowing her to work in Parisian hospitals on the condition that she did not use their intern title to enter the final exams to become a doctor, which she did. Edwards' victory also enabled Augusta Klumpke and Alice Sollier to join the course and they signed the register one after the other.

Edwards-Pilliet's specialty was surgery. Despite fierce competition, especially since she was a woman, her prize-winning dissertation helped her establish her first consulting room in 1889, where she worked for the next 50 years. In 1892, she married, and she would go on to have three children. She also taught school medicine, despite the low pay. In fact, she was the only woman of her time offered a medical teaching post by the Assistance Publique (Public Hospital System).

For 40 years she was a professor at the School for the Training of Male and Female Nurses in the Pitié-Salpêtrière Hospital and Bicêtre Hospital.

She died in 1941 at the age of 82.

== Social Advocacy ==
An outspoken feminist, Edwards-Pilliet spent much of her time advocating for social reform, principally for women and children. In 1901, Edwards-Pilliet founded The Ligue des Mères de Famille, one of the first nongovernmental organizations (NGOs) from which many of France's social organizations later developed. She was also a member of the Parti radical, which advocated for women's suffrage, and dined on Christmas Day 1912 at Paris' Restaurant Mollard (designed by Édouard Niermans), with exiled British suffragette leader Christabel Pankhurst, and fellow guests Jessie Murray Clark, Dorothy Hapgood and Irene Dallas and sister Hilda; according to The Suffragette newspaper, the evening ended with the singing of protest song "The March of the Women". In 1930, she was elected vice-president of one of the Parti radical's Paris sections.

She also became Chevalier de la Légion d'honneur (National Order of the Legion of Honour) in 1924.
