= Internat des hôpitaux de Paris =

French training route for medical doctors moving into specialisms, ran 1802 - 2004.

L'internat des hôpitaux de Paris (Paris Hospitals’ Internship Programme) was a French professional training route for early career medical doctors moving into medical specialisms. The programme ran in Paris between 1802 and 2004. Admission to the internship was by competitive examination. In 2004, the internship entrance examination was replaced by a national ranking examination.

== History ==
The Paris Hospitals’ Internship Programme was established on 10 February 1802 (4 Ventôse, Year X in the French Republican calendar which was in use until 1805).

It was set up on the instruction of Napoleon to organise medical education in the French Republic, part of the grande école framework of higher education in France. It focused on hospital-based training, independent of the theoretical examinations that students sat at university.

The first competitive examination took place on 13 September 1802 (26 Fructidor, Year X), with sixty-four candidates sitting the examination. Twenty-four students passed the examination and were appointed to an internship programme which lasted four years at the time.

Until 1885, women were barred from becoming an intern and therefore having the opportunity to work as a doctor in a hospital. This bar was by medical opposition rather than a specific rule or law. Blanche Edwards-Pilliet challenged this stance, appealing to the Paris Municipal Council where her cause was backed by Prefect Eugene Poubelle. She was successful in being allowed to register on the programme to take the intern examination. This was in the face of a petition signed by 90 medical interns and doctors opposing her entry, and her effigy being burned in the Bal Bullier, a student haunt which respectable women did not attend. She signed up for the examination preparatory course at the same time as Augusta Klumpke and Alice Sollier. In 1886 Klumpke became the first woman to pass the intern examination. Sollier was the first Black French woman to become a doctor. Russian-French Marie Nageotte-Wilbouchewitch was the second woman intern, passing the exam two years later.

Until 1952, when the system was reformed, interns lived and worked together at the hospital, with the on-call room a central part of their lives. The intern system of training came to a close in 2004, when it was replaced by a national ranking system.

== See also ==
- Medical education in France
