= Quai Louis-Blériot =

Coordinates: 48.8447°N 2.2721°E

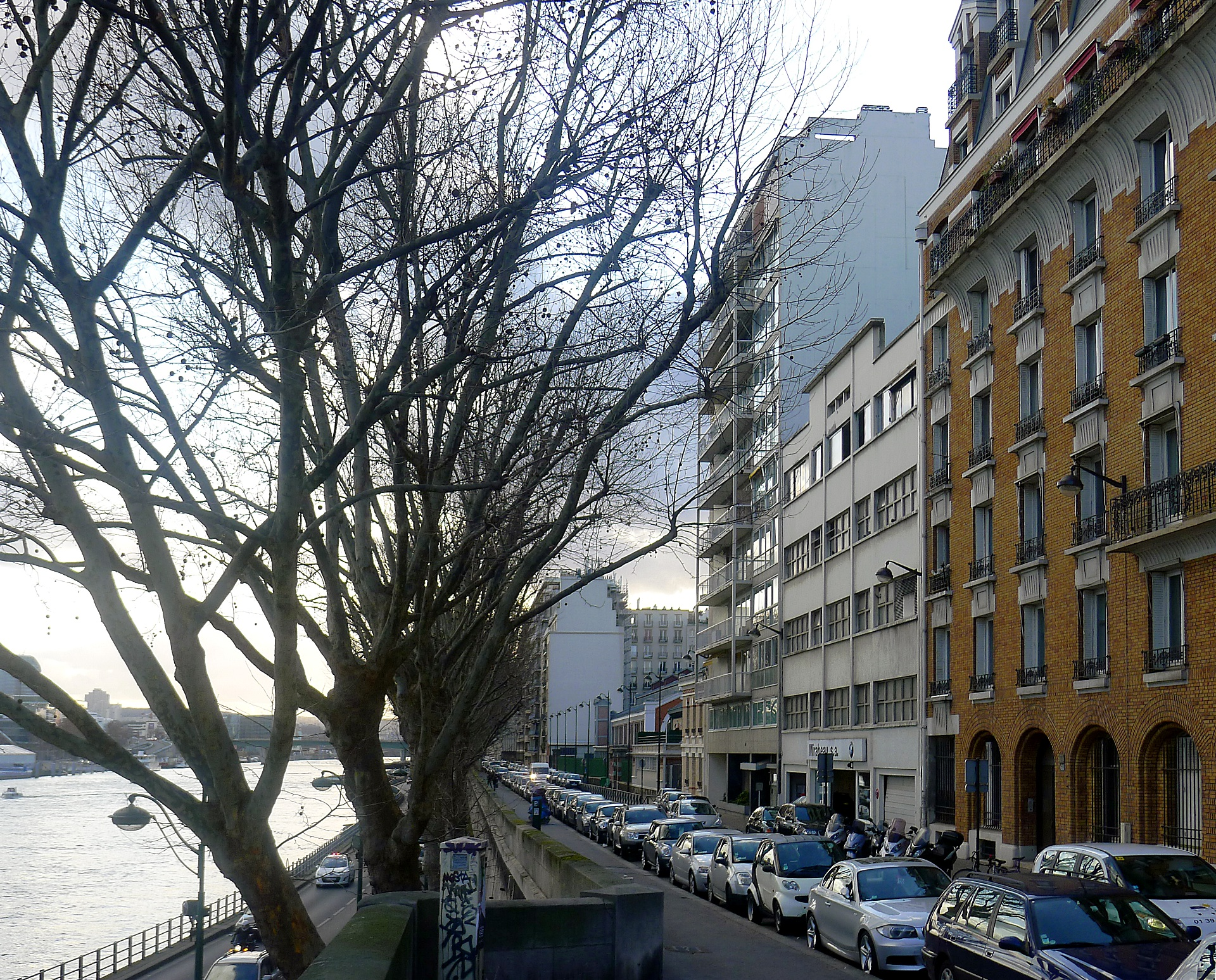
Quai Louis-Blériot in 2012.

The Quai Louis-Blériot is a quay alongside the Seine in the 16th arrondissement of Paris, France. It was known as the Quai d'Auteuil until it was renamed in honour of French aviator Louis Blériot in 1937.
