= Gabrielle Réval =

French author (1869–1938)

Gabrielle Reval
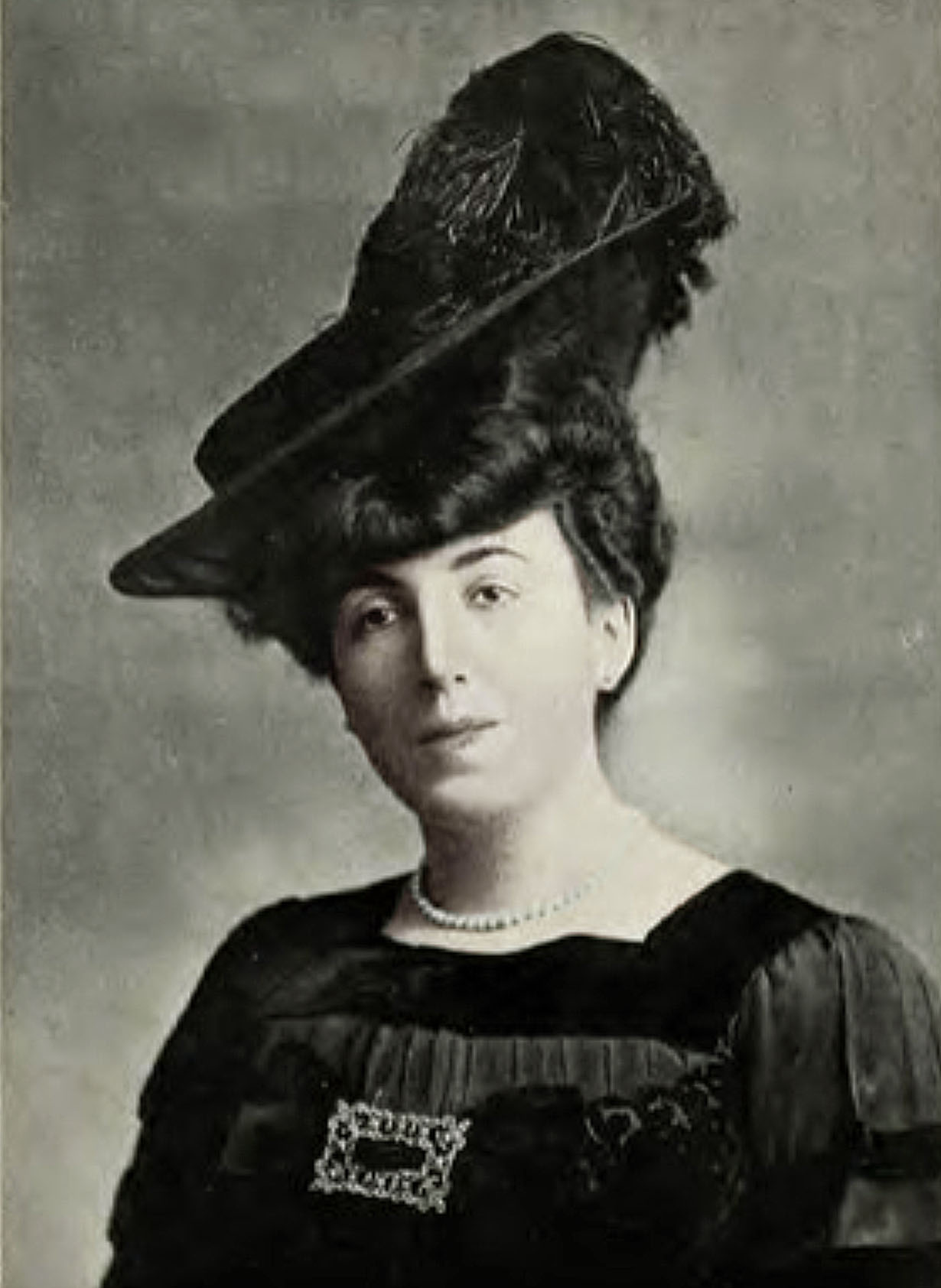
- Born: Gabrielle Élise Victoire Logerot; 20 December 1869; Viterbo, Italy
- Died: 15 October 1938 (aged 68); Lyon, France
- Resting place: Cap-d'Ail, France
- Occupation: writer
- Writing career
- Pen name: Gabrielle Reval
- Language: French
- Genres: novels; essays
- Notable awards: Knight, Legion of Honour; Prix d'Académie Française

Gabrielle Réval (also G. Réval) was the pen name of Gabrielle Élise Victoire Logerot (20 December 1869 – 15 October 1938), a French novelist and essayist.

== Biography ==
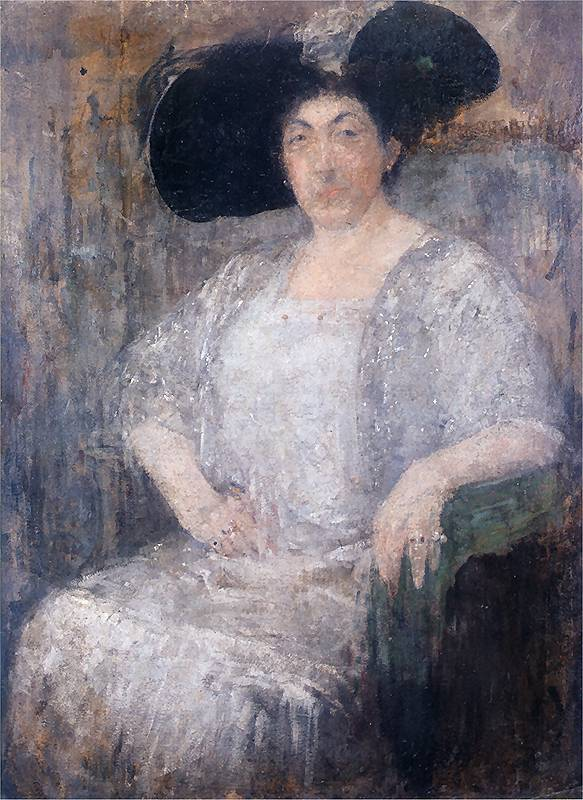
Réval's portrait by Olga Boznańska, 1912

Gabrielle Réval was born as Gabrielle Élise Victoire Logerot on 20 December 1869, in Viterbo. She was a student at the École normale supérieure de jeunes filles (ENSJF) in Sèvres, receiving her teaching diploma in 1890.

After successfully passing the agrégation in 1893, she taught at the girls' high school in Niort.

Choosing the pen name "Réval", in several of her novels, she wrote about girls in their schools and their place in society, for example, Lycéennes (1902) and La Bachelière (1910). She was noticed from her first book, Les Sévriennes (1900), in which she describes her experiences in Sèvres.

In 1904, when the issue of girls' primary and secondary education was gaining attention, she published L’Avenir de nos filles, a work listing women's professions. She underscored the precariousness for women to become authors: "Only a rich woman can, to some extent, reconcile her duties as a mother with those as a writer".

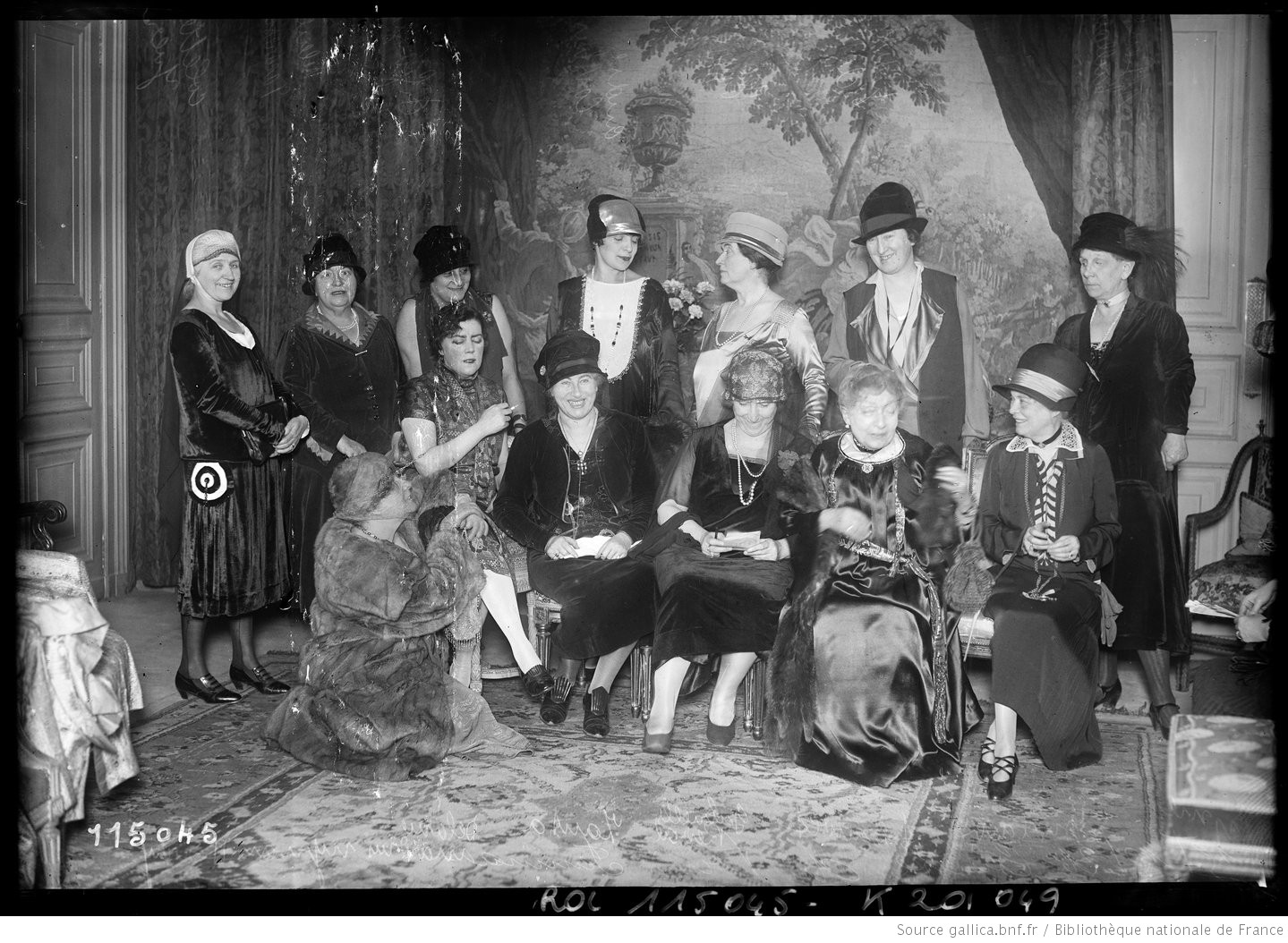
Prix Femina committee, 1926

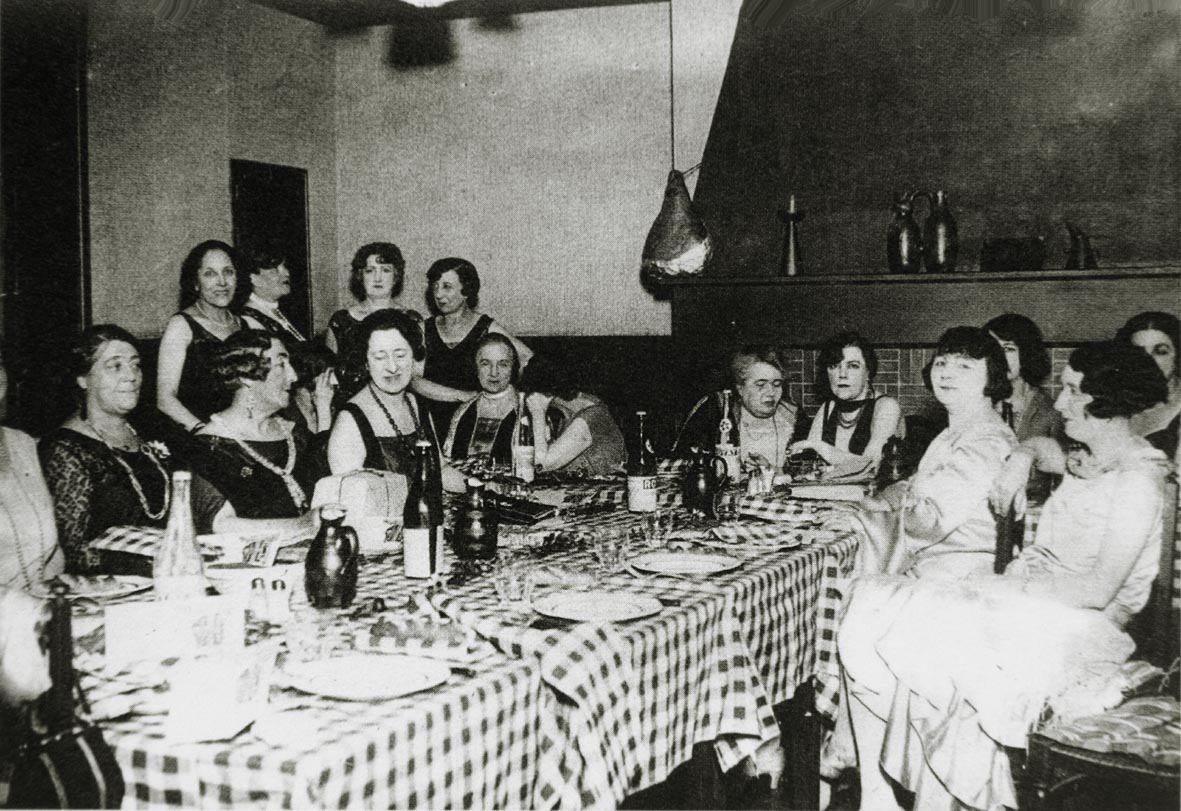
Les Belles Perdrix

In November that year, she co-founded "le prix Vie heureuse" (Happy Life award), which later became the Prix Femina. With 21 other women who contributed to the journal La Vie heureuse, she sought to develop an alternative to the Prix Goncourt, considered misogynistic.

From its inception until her death, she was an active member of the "Club des Belles Perdrix", the first French women writers' gastronomic club, which she co-founded at the restaurant Chez les Vikings, on 18 January 1928, together with some 20 others.

In 1938, she received the Prix d'Académie from the Académie Française for her life's work. She died on 15 October 1938, in Lyon, and is buried in Cap-d'Ail, on the French Riviera where she stayed regularly and often wrote about.

== Awards and honors ==
- Knight, Legion of Honour, 27 February 1927
- Prix d'Académie, Académie Française, 1938

== Selected works ==
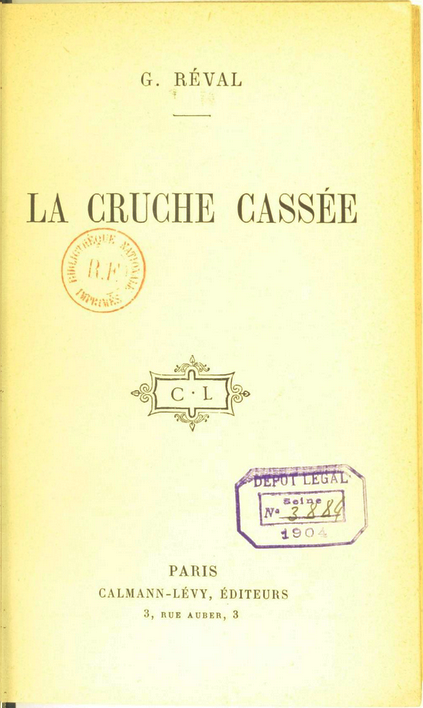
La Cruche Cassée, 1904

- Les Sévriennes, 1900
- Un lycée de jeunes filles, 1901
- Lycéennes, 1902
- La Cruche Cassée, 1904
- La Bachelière, 1910
- L'Avenir de nos filles, 1904
- L'Infante à la rose, 1920
- La fontaine des amours, 1923
- La Tour du feu, 1928
- La Côte d'Azur, 1934
