= Julia Klumpke =

American concert violinist and composer (1870 - 1962)

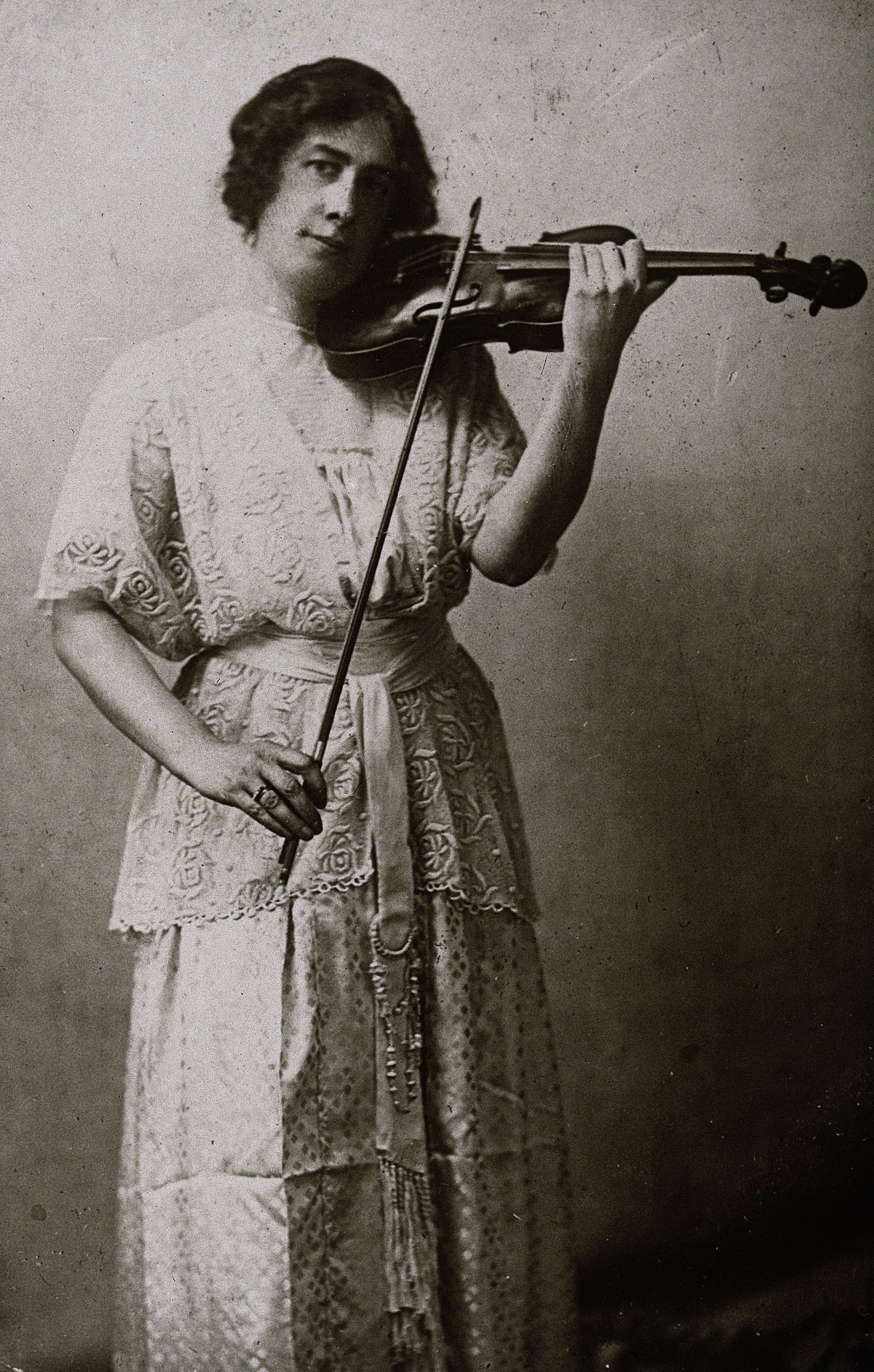
Julia Klumpke playing the violin.

Julia Klumpke, often spelled Julia Klumpkey (August 13, 1870 — August 23, 1961), was an American concert violinist and composer.

== Family and education ==
Julia Klumpke was born in San Francisco, California, the daughter of wealthy realtor John Gerald Klumpke and Dorothea Mattilda Tolle. She was one of eight children, and among her siblings were the astronomer Dorothea Klumpke-Roberts, the painter Anna Elizabeth Klumpke, and the neurologist Augusta Déjerine-Klumpke. Although reviews and other publications in her own day nearly always used the original spelling of her surname, the spelling is now often Americanized to Klumpkey.

Klumpke studied for one year at the New England Conservatory in Boston, Massachusetts, working with Emil Mahr and Herman Hartmann (violin) and with Percy Goetschius (composition). She graduated in 1895 with a degree in violin performance. She got further training abroad in the 1920s, studying violin with Eugène Ysaÿe, Leopold Auer, William Henley, and Maurice Hewitt and viola with Henri Benoit. She took lessons in composition from Nadia Boulanger and Annette Dieudonné in Paris.

== Music career ==
Klumpke gave one of her earliest recitals in Honolulu, Hawaii, in 1908. Beginning sometime between 1906 and 1910, Klumpke taught violin at Converse College, a woman's college in Spartanburg, South Carolina, and directed the Spartanburg Symphony Orchestra; these positions lasted with interruptions through 1922. During World War I, she left for a time to do war work in Europe, assisting her sister Anna, who had converted her home outside Paris into a hospital for wounded soldiers.

In 1928, she went on a world tour. In the mid-1930s, Klumpke returned live in San Francisco, where she was a member of several musical associations, including the Women Musicians Club and the Women's City Club (both of San Francisco), the California Composers Society, and the Music Teacher's Association of California.

Klumpke composed over four dozen pieces of music, mainly chamber music, songs, and choral music. She composed a dramatic tone poem, The Twin Guardians of the Golden Gate, for the 1939 Golden Gate International Exposition.

Klumpke died in San Francisco and is buried there in the Neptune Society's Columbarium with her father and two of her sisters. In her will, she left scholarships to both the San Francisco Symphony (for an outstanding string player) and Converse College. Her personal papers and musical manuscripts are held in the Julia Klumpkey Collection at the New England Conservatory.

== Works ==
Chamber works

- Quatre pièces (Four Pieces, 1932; for viola and piano)
- Second Suite for Viola and Piano (1935)
- Lullaby for Viola and Piano (1937)
- Suite for Viola and Piano: San Francisco Bay (1951)
- Sonata no. 3 for violin and cello
- Suite for small orchestra
- First trio for violin, clarinet, and piano
- Second trio for violin, clarinet, and piano
- Trio for piano, violin, and cello
- Miniature string trio
- Andante for strings
- Valse fantaisiste (Whimsical Waltz)

Choral compositions

- "Wait on the Lord"
- "The Lord Is My Shepherd: Anthem for Mixed Quartet and Organ"
- "He Shall Give His Angels Charge Over Thee (Psalm 91)"

Compositions for solo voice

- "Candle Lighting Song"
- "In Flanders Field"
- "Songs for Children"

Other compositions

- The Twin Guardians of the Golden Gate (1939)
