= Paul Sollier =

French doctor and psychologist

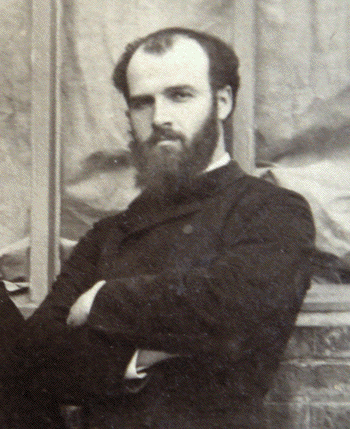
- Sollier in 1886
- Born: 31 August 1861; Bléré, Indre-et-Loire, France
- Died: 8 June 1933 (aged 71)
- Occupations: Medical doctor and psychologist

Paul Auguste Sollier (French pronunciation: [pɔl oɡyst sɔlje]; 31 August 1861 – 8 June 1933) was a French medical doctor and psychologist.

== Life and career ==
Sollier was born in Bléré, Indre-et-Loire, France.

Paul Sollier (1861–1933) at the time was considered the most gifted pupil of French neurologist Jean-Martin Charcot, together with Joseph Babinski. Because of his interest in psychology, unique at the time for a neurologist, but also his opposition to the leading figure in psychiatry Pierre Janet, Sollier was never accepted by his contemporary neurologists and psychiatrists. He could not follow an academic career and was never elected to the Académie de Médecine, despite several applications.

His scientific and clinical interests encompassed classical neurological syndromes but also hysteria, memory, emotions and intellectual disability, where he was the precursor of the development of the intellectual ratio. Already in the 1890s, he developed cognitive behavioral therapies, which he applied to his most famous patient, French novelist Marcel Proust. Proust largely inspired himself from Sollier's The Problem of Memory (1900) for his emphasis on involuntary memory in his 1913–1927 novel In Search of Lost Time. Sollier can be considered one of the first neuropsychologists.

== Personal life ==
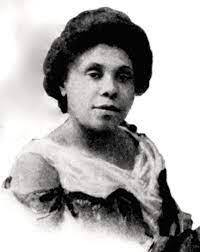
Dr. Alice Sollier

Sollier married Alice Mathieu-Dubois, a fellow medical student, on 21 January 1886. She was the first Black French woman to qualify as a medical doctor. The couple had two children: René Victor, born on 3 November 1886 and died three days later, and Suzanne, born on 8 November 1887, fifteen days after her mother defended her doctoral thesis.

== Works ==
- Sens musculaire, 1887.
- Du role de l'hérédité dans l'alcoolisme, 1888.
- Psychologie de l'idiot et de l'imbécile, 1890.
- Guide pratique des maladies mentales, 1893.
- Genèse et nature de l'hystérie, 1897.
- L'Hystérie et son traitement, 1901.
- Le Mécanisme des émotions. Leçons faites à l'Université nouvelle de Bruxelles, 1903.
- Les phénomènes d'autoscopie, 1903.
