= Alice Sollier =

French medical doctor (1861-1942)

Alice Maille
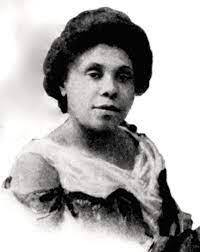
- Born: Alice Sollier; 3 April 1861; Compiègne, France
- Died: 29 January 1942 (aged 80); Paris, France
- Other name: Alice Mathieu-Dubois
- Known for: First French black woman to qualify as medical doctor
- Spouse: Paul Sollier

Alice Sollier (Note: French pronunciation: [alis sɔlje].) (née Maille, (Note: French pronunciation: [maj].) later Alice Mathieu-Dubois; (Note: French pronunciation: [matjødybwa].) 3 April 1861 – 29 January 1942) was a French doctor. She was the first black woman to earn a bachelor's degree in France and in 1887 became the first black French woman to qualify as a medical doctor. She was the first French female physician to become the director of a private healthcare facility.

== Early life and education ==
La dentition chez les enfants idiots, Mme Sollier in L'Art dentaire, May 1888

Alice Maille was born on 3 April 1861 in Compiègne to Flore-Hortense Maille and Mathieu Victoire, known as Dubois. Her mother was white, and her father was black. Her father had been enslaved in the colony of French Guiana but freed in 1834. He was a dentist by the time of Alice's birth. Her parents married on 8 May 1867, some years after Alice's birth, and she took the surname Mathieu-Dubois, based on her father's first name and part of his surname. Her mother died six months after the wedding, after which her father then took sole responsibility for her education.

Alice Mathieu-Dubois earned her Bachelor of Science degree in Paris in 1879, followed by a Bachelor of Arts degree in rhetoric in 1880 and philosophy in 1881. In 1880, the newspaper Le Gaulois reported that "Miss Mathieu-Dubois, who had already obtained her bachelor's degree in science the previous year, successfully passed exams that, to our knowledge, had never before been taken by a black woman". Another newspaper, Le Pays, noted in 1881 that only two young women had taken and passed the second part of the baccalaureate in arts (philosophy), earning a "fairly good" grade and the congratulations of the jury. One of them was "a young black woman, already a bachelor of science, Mlle Mathieu-Dubois, who had begun her medical studies with a view to obtaining a doctorate in medicine".

Mathieu-Dubois enrolled at the University of Paris Faculty of Medicine. Women had only been allowed to enroll at the Faculty of Medicine since 1869 when Madeleine Brès had successfully made her case to be admitted. In Paris, she rented a room from the father of her friend Blanche Edwards, herself the first woman to pass the l'internat de médecine exam in France. Mathieu-Dubois was an extern in Paris hospitals from 1883. She was ranked 72nd out of 254 in the exam. Her future husband ranked 32nd. Two other women passed the externship exam alongside her.

Mathieu-Dubois married Paul Sollier, a fellow medical student, on 21 January 1886 and adopted his surname. The couple had two children: René Victor, born on 3 November 1886 and died three days later, and Suzanne, born on 8 November 1887, fifteen days after her mother defended her doctoral thesis.

Sollier earned her doctorate in 1887 with a thesis entitled L'état de la dentition chez les enfants idiots et arriérés: contribution à l'étude des dégénérescences dans l'espèce humaine, which was illustrated with 32 figures. After leaning towards dentistry like her father, she eventually turned her attention to nervous disorders.

The press reported on her thesis defence: "The female doctor is no longer a curiosity. What is rarer is a black female doctor. One such doctor, Mrs. Sollier, has just successfully defended her thesis in medicine" and stated "despite her colour, she is French by birth", some using more racist terms. Le Petit Journal described her as "a tall, beautiful person with slightly brownish skin, large black eyes, invariably dressed in a blue dress with a masculine cut, without any frills" and stated that she was well-known on the Left Bank in Paris because of her summer walks in the Jardin du Luxembourg with a book in her hand.

Sollier registered for the internship competition at the same time as Blanche Edwards but did not take the exams, possibly because she was discouraged by the demonstrations organised by many students against the presence of women on the day of the competition, as well as by racist remarks from fellow students and the press. Le Figaro, in an article on the few female doctors in Paris, referred to her alongside her contemporaries Blanche Edwards and Augusta Déjerine-Klumpke, not naming her but referring to "this little Creole girl whom all the students call Bamboula".

== Career ==
From 1889 to 1897, Sollier and her husband ran the Villa Montsouris clinic on Rue de la Santé in Paris. In doing so, she became the first woman to run a private healthcare facility dedicated to nervous disorders.

In 1896, her husband founded a limited partnership, Dr Paul Sollier et Cie, known as the Établissement d'hydrothérapie médicale de Boulogne-sur-Seine, of which he was the sole managing director and a major shareholder. Alice Sollier's 'technical collaboration' was included in the list of contributions. The company's articles of association stipulated that Alice Sollier would become manager if Paul Sollier resigned or died. Marcel Proust was a patient at the clinic and featured elements of the treatment in his novel, In Search of Lost Time. From April 1897 to June 1921, Alice Sollier co-managed the Boulogne-sur-Seine sanatorium with her husband, which specialised in the treatment of nervous system disorders and drug addiction (particularly morphine).

In 1904, Sollier was interviewed by Gabrielle Réval for the daily newspaper L'Écho de Paris and for Réval's book, L'Avenir de nos filles (The Future of Our Daughters), about her role in the medical and practical management of the sanatorium, the place of young women in medical studies, and medical careers for women.

From June 1921 or 1922 onwards, Sollier practised as a doctor at the Saint-Cloud neurological clinic. She co-directed it with Dr Morat, formerly an assistant doctor at the Boulogne sanatorium. She also practised at the Malmaison sanatorium in Rueil-Malmaison until 1935.

== Later life ==
Sollier's husband died on 8 June 1933. Léon Daudet, who had known him when he was also studying medicine, paid tribute to him in an article published in the far-right daily newspaper L'Action française and dedicated to “docteur” Alice Sollier, describing her as Paul Sollier's "admirable wife and collaborator".

Sollier remained in Saint-Cloud until her house and clinic were requisitioned by the Germans during the Occupation of World War II. She lived with her daughter at the Sainte-Anne Hospital, where her daughter's husband worked, then on Rue d'Alésia, Paris, where she died on 29 January 1942.

== Awards ==
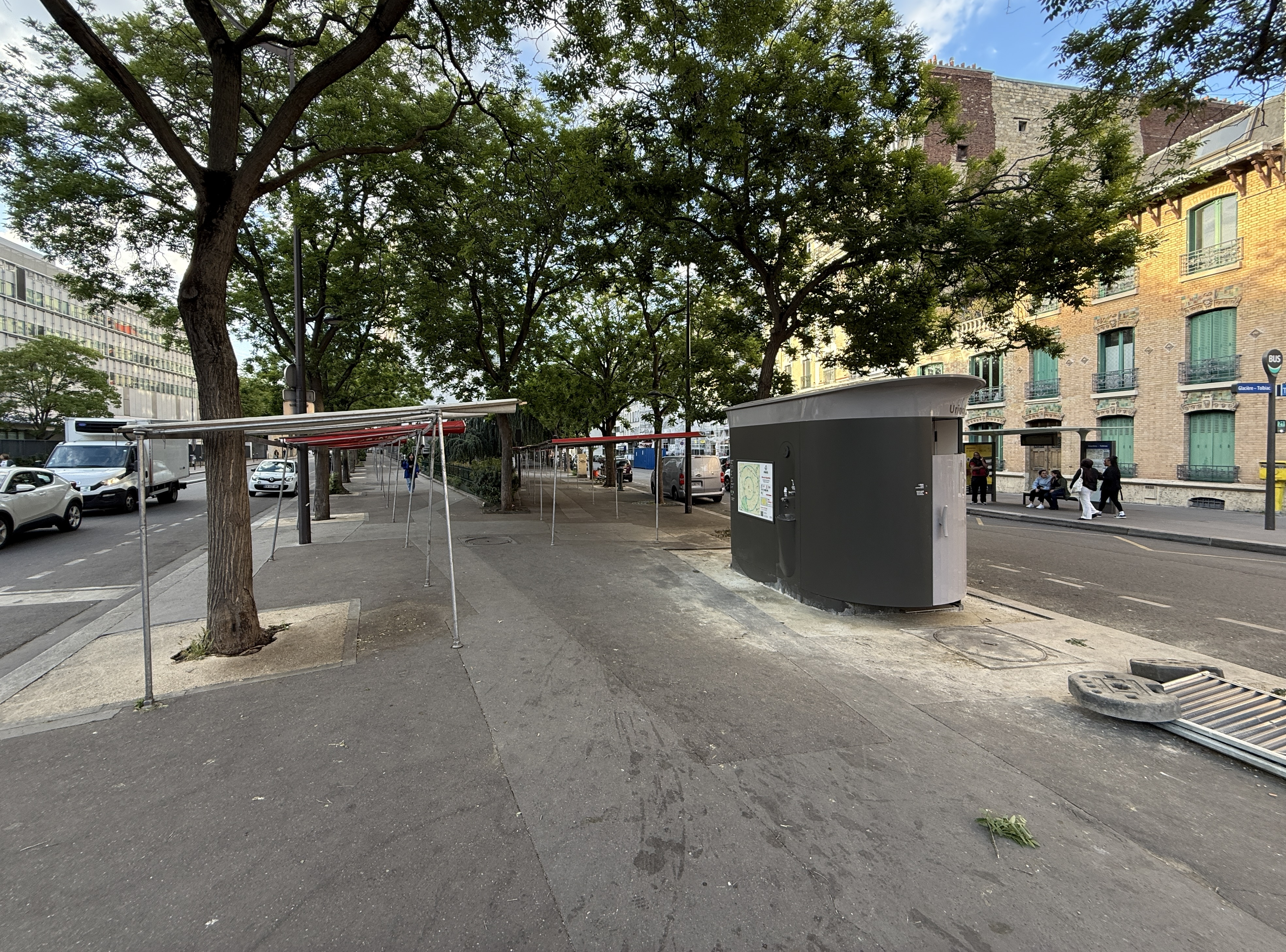
Place Alice Mathieu Dubois - Paris XIII (FR75)

In 1925, Alice Sollier, née Alice Dubois, was awarded the croix de chevalier of the Legion of Honour, with the citation:

En l'absence du docteur Sollier, mobilisé dès le 2 août 1914, a assumé la direction pendant toute la durée de la guerre du Sanatorium de Boulogne sur Seine que dirigeait ce praticien. Mme Sollier avec un rare dévouement a notamment assuré l'évacuation fin août 1914 de tous les malades sur la zone de l'intérieur. Elle les a de nouveau réunis dans l'établissement après la Bataille de la Marne (1914). (In the absence of Dr. Sollier, who was called up on 2 August 1914, she took over the management of the Boulogne-sur-Seine Sanatorium, which she ran for the duration of the war. With rare dedication, Mrs. Sollier ensured the evacuation of all patients from the interior at the end of August 1914. She reunited them in the establishment after the Battle of the Marne).

Sollier's patron in the order was Countess Anna de Noailles, who was treated twice at the Boulogne sanatorium and in 1924 at the Saint-Cloud clinic.

== Legacy ==
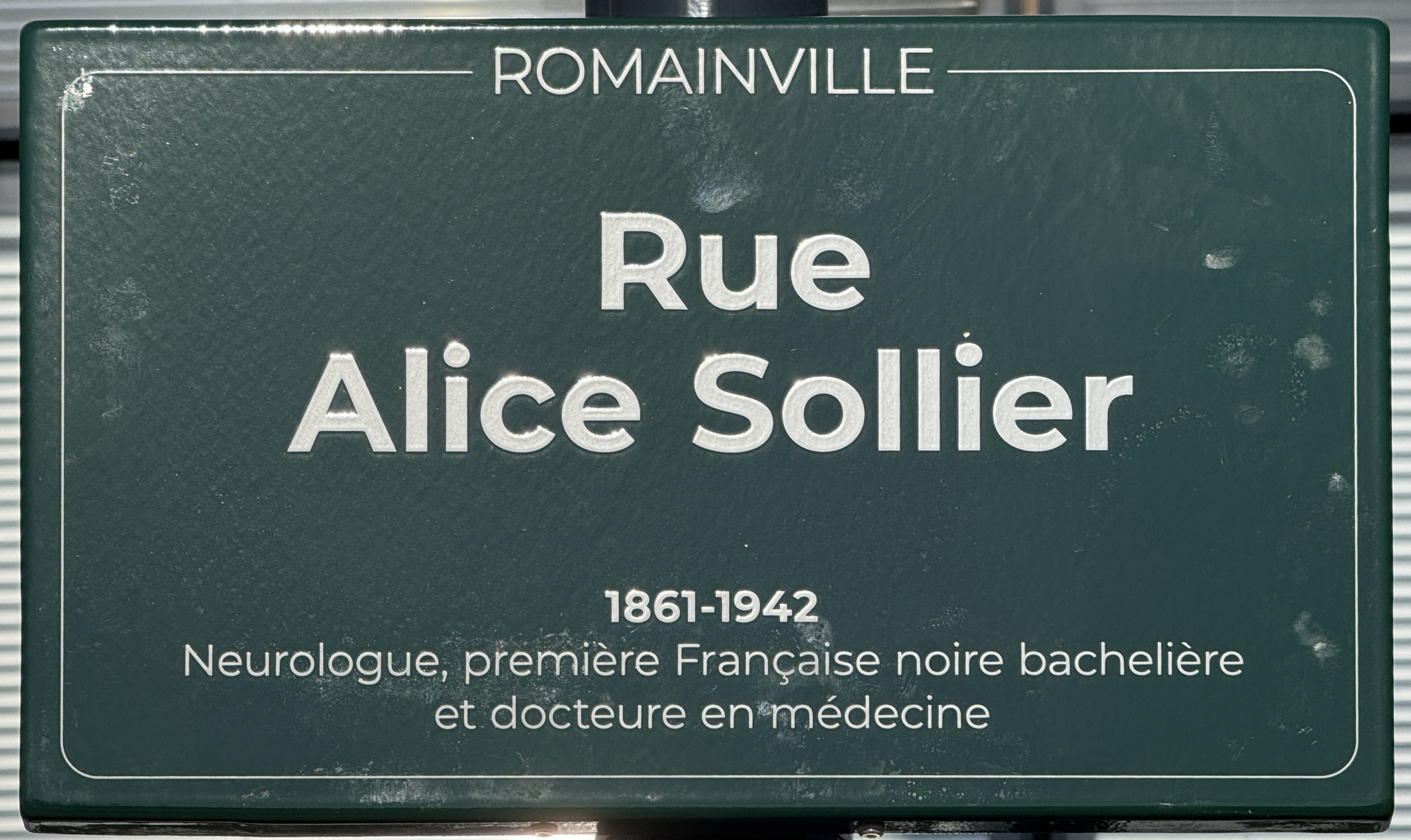
Rue Alice Sollier street sign in Romainville

Following proposals to name a street for her in Crépy-en-Valois, on 20 December 2024, the conseil municipal de Compiègne approved the creation of a street bearing Alice Sollier's maiden name in the Musicians' Quarter, which was inaugurated in 2025.

A square in the 13th arrondissement of Paris was named Place Alice-Mathieu-Dubois in June 2025.

In 2026, Sollier was announced as one of 72 historical women in STEM whose names have been proposed to be added to the 72 men already celebrated on the Eiffel Tower. The plan was announced by the Mayor of Paris, Anne Hidalgo, following the recommendations of a committee led by Isabelle Vauglin of Femmes et Sciences and Jean-François Martins, representing the operating company which runs the Eiffel Tower.

== Bibliography ==
- Pierrette Caire Dieu, «Le docteur Alice Mathieu-Dubois épouse Sollier (1861-1942). Un destin d'exception», Carnets d'histoire de la médecine, vol. 2020-4, p. 1-19.
- Josette Dall'Ava-Santucci, «Au XIXe siècle, les femmes à l'assaut de la médecine», La Revue du praticien, 2005, 55.
- Le Maléfan, Pascal. «La psychothérapie naissante au sanatorium du Dr Sollier (1861-1933). À propos de Cam. S., délirante spirite», Bulletin de psychologie, vol. 516, no. 6, 2011, pp. 559–571.
