= Alfred Vulpian =

French physician and neurologist

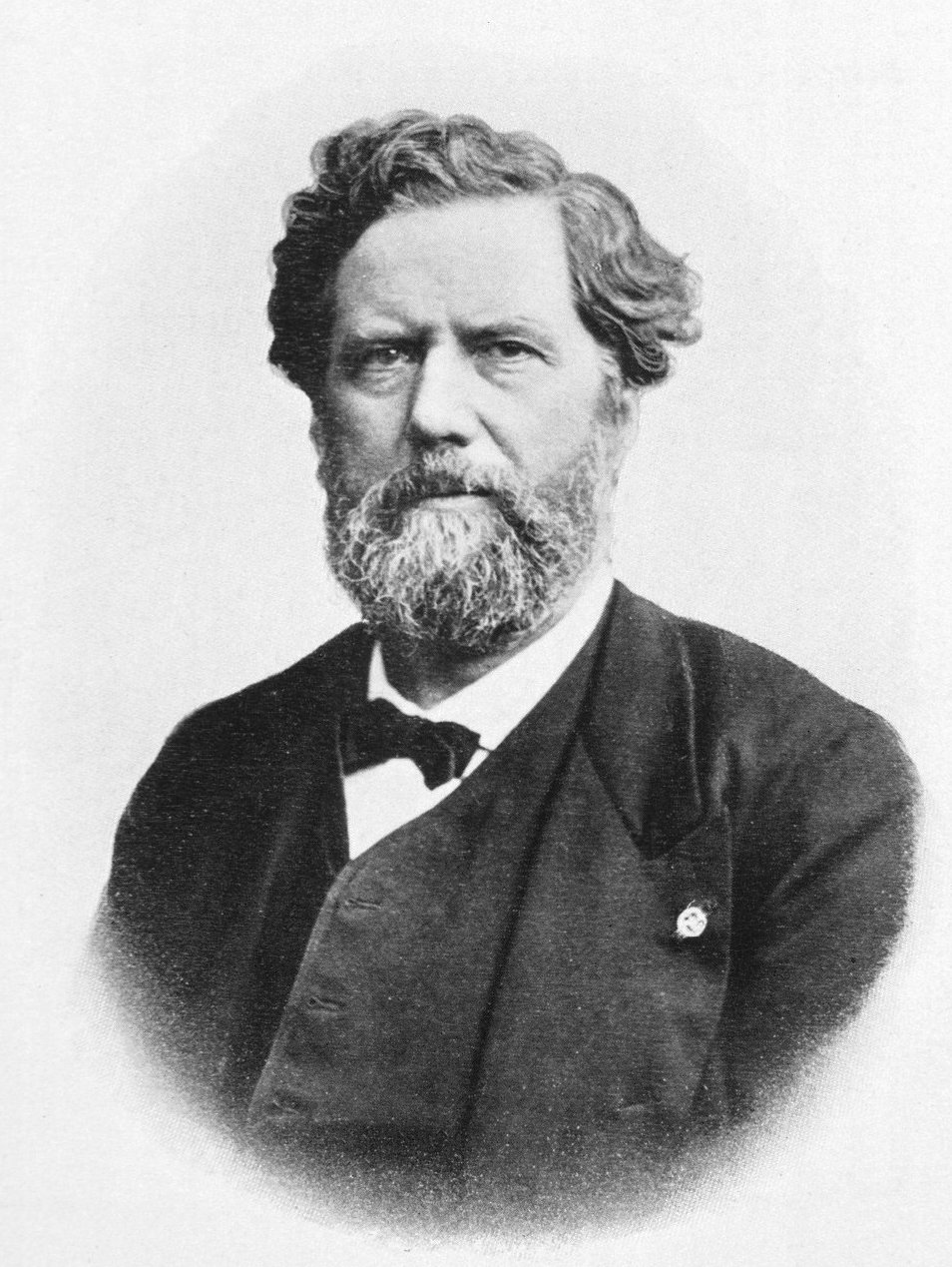
Alfred Vulpian

Edmé Félix Alfred Vulpian (5 January 1826 – 18 May 1887) was a French medical doctor and neurologist. He was the co-discoverer of Vulpian-Bernhardt spinal muscular atrophy and the Vulpian-Heidenhain-Sherrington phenomenon.

Vulpian was born in Paris, France, in 1826. Among other noted discoveries and experiments, Vulpian discovered adrenaline in the adrenal medulla. He was the first to use the term "fibrillation" to describe a chaotic irregular rhythm of the heart.

== Vulpian's monument in Paris ==
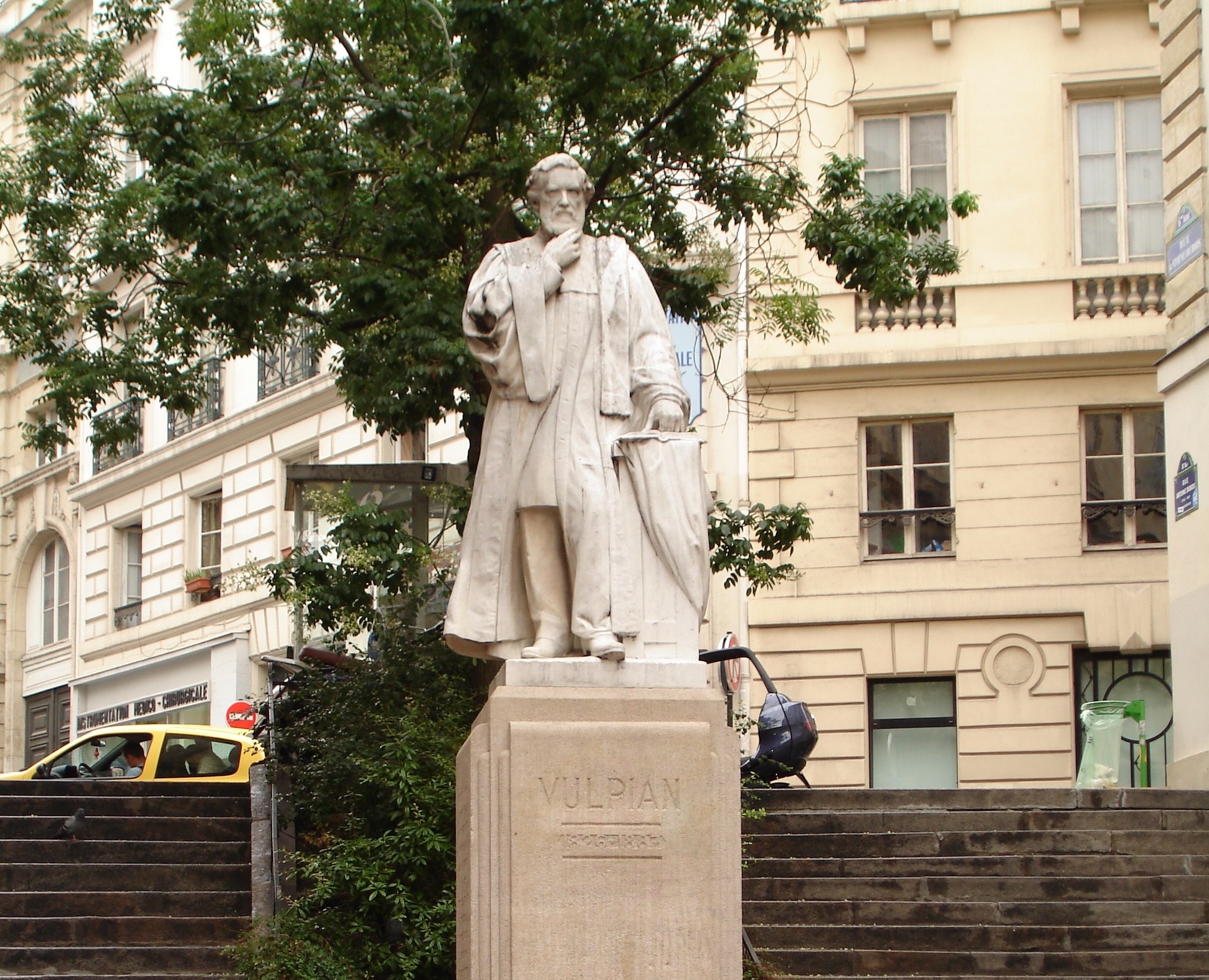
Vulpian's monument in Rue Antoine Dubois, Paris

A large marble statue has been erected to Vulpian, just at the end of Rue Antoine Dubois, a short distance from the Faculty of Medicine in which he once taught. In the basement, there is the following inscription: vulpian.

The statue features in La Vérité (film), situated outside the hotel where the main character, Dominique (Bridgitte Bardot), lives for much of the film.

== Bibliography ==
- Essai sur l'origine réelle de plusieurs nerfs crâniens. Doctoral thesis, Paris, 1853.
- Note sur quelques réactions propres à la substance des capsules surrénales. Comptes Rendus de l'Académie des Sciences, Paris, 1856, 43: 663–665.
- Des pneumonies secondaires. Thèse d'agrégation, Paris, 1860.
- Leçons sur la physiologie générale et comparée du système nerveux, faites en 1864 au Muséum d'histoire naturelle. Paris, Gerner-Baillière, 1866.
- Leçons sur l'appareil vaso-moteur (physiologie et pathologie) faites à la Faculté de Médecine de Paris en 1873. Rédigées par H. C. Carville. Paris, Gerner-Baillière, 2 volumes, 1874–1875.
- Leçons sur la pathologie expérimentale de l'appareil digestif.
- Leçons sur l'action physiologique des poisons et médicaments, faites à la Faculté de médecine de Paris en 1875. Journal de l'École de Médecine.
- Maladies du système nerveux; leçons professées à la Faculté de Médecine. 2 volumes, Paris, Doin, 1879 and 1886.

== See also ==
- Joseph Jules Dejerine
