= Klumpke paralysis =

Klumpke's paralysis
- Other names: Klumpke's palsy, Dejerine–Klumpke palsy
- Brachial plexus. Klumpke paralysis primarily affects C8 and T1.
- Specialty: Neurology

Klumpke's paralysis is a variety of partial palsy of the lower roots of the brachial plexus. The brachial plexus is a network of spinal nerves that originates in the back of the neck, extends through the axilla (armpit), and gives rise to nerves to the upper limb. The paralytic condition is named after Augusta Déjerine-Klumpke.

== Signs and symptoms ==
Symptoms can range from minor to severe and can be obvious or subtle. The right arm and hand are more likely to be affected than the left. Symptoms include atrophy of the arm or hand, claw hand, constant crying (due to pain), intrinsic minus hand deformity, paralysis of intrinsic hand muscles, and C8/T1 Dermatome distribution numbness. Involvement of T1 may result in Horner's syndrome, with ptosis, and miosis. Weakness or lack of ability to use specific muscles of the shoulder or arm. It can be contrasted to Erb-Duchenne's palsy, which affects C5 and C6.

== Cause ==
Klumpke's paralysis is a form of paralysis involving the muscles of the forearm and hand, resulting from a brachial plexus injury in which the eighth cervical (C8) and first thoracic (T1) nerves are injured either before or after they have joined to form the lower trunk. The subsequent paralysis affects, principally, the intrinsic muscles of the hand (notably the interossei, thenar and hypothenar muscles) and the flexors of the wrist and fingers (notably flexor carpi ulnaris and ulnar half of the flexor digitorum profundus). The classic presentation of Klumpke's palsy is the "claw hand" where the forearm is supinated, the wrist extended and the fingers flexed. If Horner syndrome is present, there is miosis (constriction of the pupils) in the affected eye.

The injury can result from difficulties in childbirth. The most common aetiological mechanism is caused by a traumatic vaginal delivery. The risk is greater when the mother is small or when the infant is of large weight. Risk of injury to the lower brachial plexus results from traction on an abducted arm, as with an infant being pulled from the birth canal by an extended arm above the head or with someone catching themselves by a branch as they fall from a tree. Lower brachial plexus injuries should be distinguished from upper brachial plexus injuries, which can also result from birth trauma but give a different syndrome of weakness known as Erb's palsy. Other trauma, such as motorcycle accidents, that have similar spinal cord injuries to C8 and T1, also show the same symptoms of Klumpke's paralysis.

== Diagnosis ==
Electromyography and nerve conduction velocity testing can help to diagnose the location and severity of the lesion. Otherwise, the diagnosis is one made clinically after a thorough neurologic exam.

== Treatment ==
Treatment effectiveness varies depending on the initial severity of the injury. Physiotherapy is used to increase strength of muscle and improve muscle functions. Electrical modalities such as electric nerve stimulation can also be used.

Occupational therapy to provide exercises and coping mechanisms to improve the patient's ability to perform activities of daily living. Goals of therapy are to improve tactile sensation, proprioception, and range of motion.

Acute treatment of a severe injury will involve repositioning and splinting or casting of the extremity.

== Epidemiology ==
Klumpke Palsy is listed as a 'rare disease' by the Office of Rare Diseases (ORD) of the National Institutes of Health (NIH). This means that Klumpke palsy, or a subtype of Klumpke palsy, affects fewer than 200,000 people in the US population.

== See also ==
- Dystocia
- Erb's palsy
