= Augusta Dejerine-Klumpke =

American-born French neurologist (1859–1927)

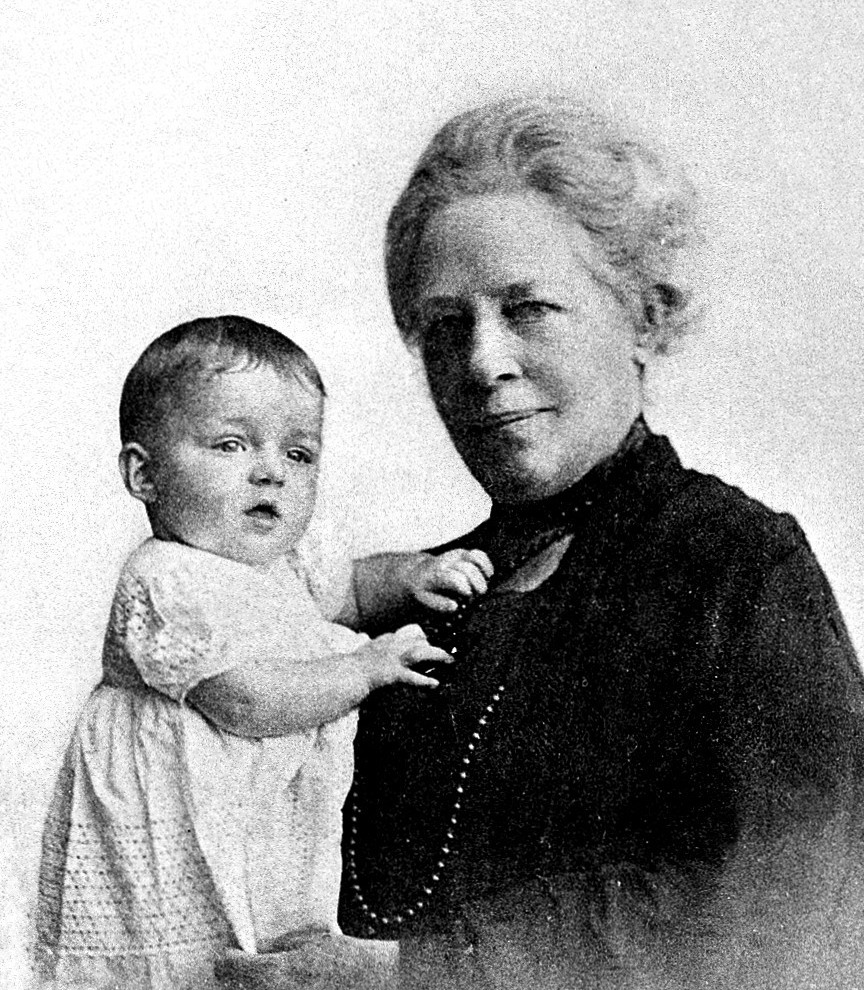
- Klumpke and her daughter Yvonne Sorrel-Dejerine
- Born: Augusta Klumpke; 15 October 1859; San Francisco, California, U.S.
- Died: 5 November 1927 (aged 68); Paris, France
- Education: Paris Medical Faculty
- Known for: Klumpke paralysis
- Spouse: Joseph Jules Dejerine
- Children: Yvonne Sorrel-Dejerine
- Relatives: Dorothea, Julia, Anne Elizabeth (sisters)
- Awards: Officier de la Légion d'honneur; Chevalier de la Légion d'honneur
- Scientific career
- Fields: Neuroanatomy
- Thesis: Des polynévrites en général et des paralysies et atrophies saturnines en particulier. Etude clinique et anatomo-pathologique (1889)

Signature
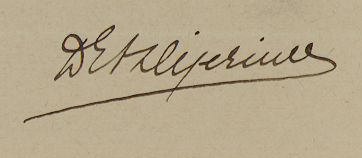

Augusta Dejerine-Klumpke (15 October 1859 – 5 November 1927) was an American-born French medical doctor known for her work in neuroanatomy. She was the first female medical intern to work in a hospital in Paris. She was a recipient of the Officier de la Légion d'honneur and Chevalier de la Légion d'honneur.

Dejerine-Klumpke discovered Klumpke paralysis, which is named after her.

== Early life and education ==
Augusta Klumpke was born in San Francisco, California, the daughter of Dorothea Mathilda Tolle, of New York, and John Gerard Klumpke, a businessman. Her older sister, Anna Elizabeth Klumpke, had an infection in her leg that left her with a disability. Their mother took the family to Europe for eighteen months to find physicians for Anna, leaving their father behind in San Francisco.

Klumpke says her parents grew apart in her mother's absence, and a 1906 newspaper article implies that John Klumpke had an extramarital affair that ended their marriage. After her divorce, Tolle took her children to Bad Cannstatt, Germany, and then Lausanne, Switzerland. Klumpke says that her mother suggested that she study medicine, and moved their family to Paris in October 1877 to facilitate this.

Three of Klumpke's sisters were very successful in their fields: Anna Elizabeth Klumpke as a portrait artist; Dorothea Klumpke as an astronomer, and the first woman with a degree in mathematics from the Sorbonne; and Julia Klumpke as a violinist, noted for studying with Eugène Ysaÿe. A fifth sister, Mathilda Klumpke, studied piano, but died of diphtheria at the age of 30. Their brother, John William Klumpke, became an engineer.

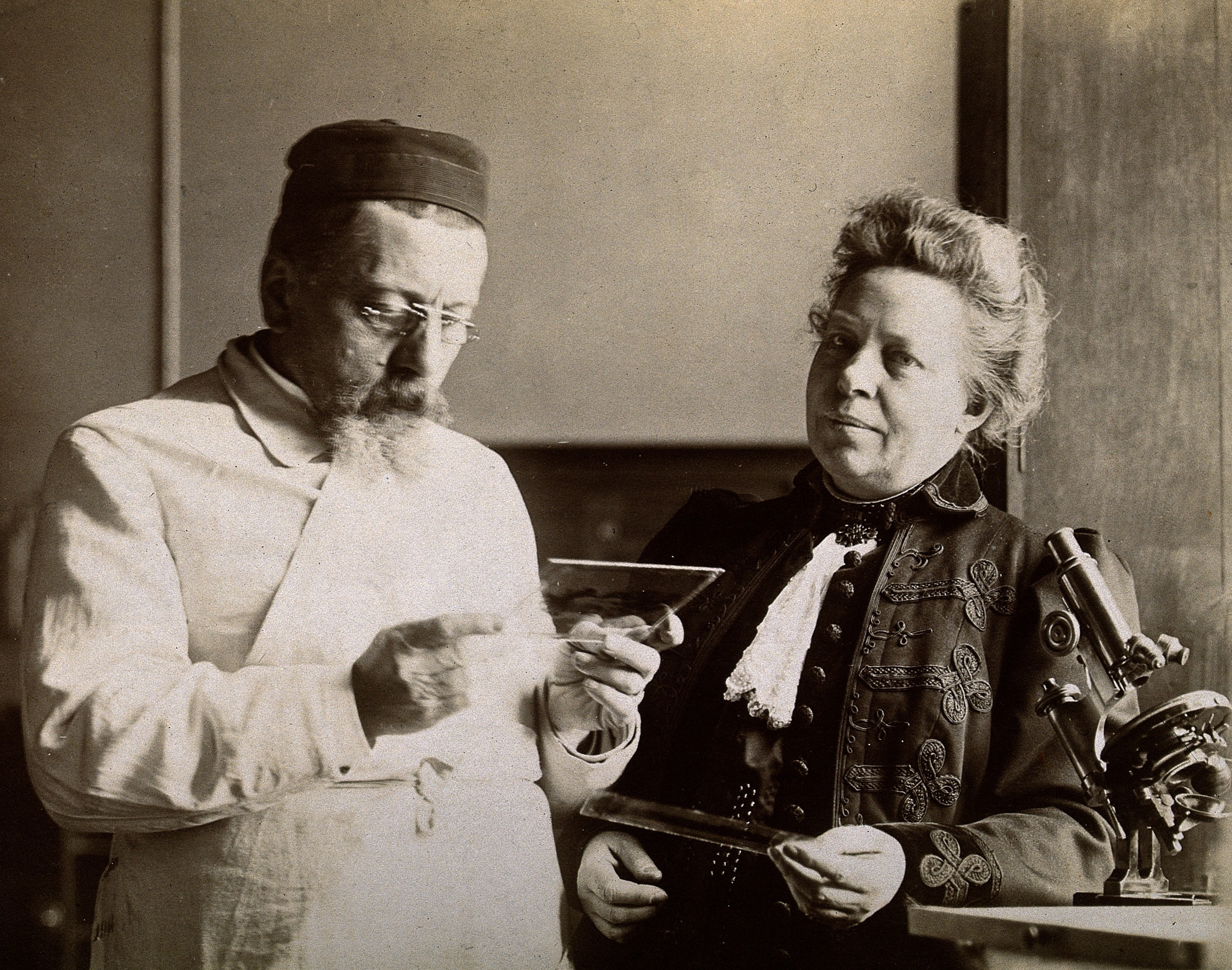
Jules and Augusta Dejerine

Klumpke trained at the Faculty of Medicine in Paris, while taking science classes at the Sorbonne and working at the laboratories of the Museum of Natural History. She then studied anatomy and dissection, receiving a prize for her skills. She started applying for hospital externships, for further study, but was repeatedly rejected due to her gender. In 1880, she started an internship at the Charité Hospital in Paris. The head of the clinic was Joseph Jules Dejerine, a scientist ten years her senior whom she would later marry. She then went to Saint-Louis Hospital in Paris to study obstetrics and pediatrics. In 1885, Blanche Edwards-Pillet petitioned before the Paris municipal council, and finally the rules were changed, allowing women to compete for externships. Edwards-Pillet, Klumpke and Alice Sollier became the first women externs in Paris hospitals.

== Career ==
During her externship, Klumpke attended neurology courses with Jean-Martin Charcot and began to study the anatomy of the brachial plexus under her mentor, Alfred Vulpian. In 1883, she saw a child with a brachial plexus palsy, but unusual miosis of the eye on that side of the body. She based her medical thesis on the study and description of this phenomenon, now called Klumpke paralysis. Because of the petitions of Blanche Edwards-Pillet, she was able to publish this thesis in 1885, and in 1886 she won the Godard Prize of the Academy of Medicine.

Her doctoral thesis, Des polynévrites en général et des paralysies et atrophies saturnines en particulier. Etude clinique et anatomo-pathologique (About polyneuritis in general, and Saturnian palsies and atrophies in particular: Clinical and anatomopathological study), was accepted in 1889, and won the silver medal at the Paris Faculty of Medicine and the 1890 Lallemand Prize of the Academy of Sciences.

In 1888, Klumpke married Joseph Jules Dejerine. Together, they worked to determine and describe the anatomy of the central and peripheral nervous systems, along with the neuropathology of injury. While Dejerine-Klumpke, as she was now known, was listed as a collaborator on Dejerine's seminal two-volume textbook of neuroanatomy Anatomie des Centres Nerveux, and his second textbook Sémiologie des affections du système nerveux, his student André Thomas wrote that she was involved in every aspect, including in conception and synthesis of the data. She was also an author or co-author on more than 56 papers between the years of 1885–1926.

=== Eviction from Salpêtrière Hospital ===
Like Klumpke, Joseph Jules Dejerine was a student of Alfred Vulpian. Competing neurologists studied under Jean-Martin Charcot, including Pierre Marie. In 1892, Dejerine challenged Marie to a duel over their publications on the etiology of sensory ataxia. No shots were fired, but the men remained rivals for life.

Charcot died in 1893, and his position as chair of neurology at Pitié-Salpêtrière Hospital was given to Fulgence Raymond. After Raymond's death in 1910, Klumpke became chair.

When Dejerine died in 1917, Marie became chair. He gave Dejerine-Klumpke 15 days to clear out her husband's documents and leave. She instead transferred all of Dejerine's materials from the neurology department to the pathology department, and started the Dejerine Foundation with their daughter Yvonne Sorrel-Dejerine to preserve Dejerine's work.

Dejerine-Klumpke then worked as a medical officer in the Hôtel National des Invalides, where she earned the French Medal of Honor, and was promoted to Officer of the Legion of Honour.

== Personal life ==
The Dejerines had a daughter, Yvonne Sorrel-Dejerine (1891–1986), who became a neurologist, and married a surgeon, Etienne-Pierre Sorrel. She helped preserve her father's work through the Dejerine Foundation.

== Death ==
Klumpke died of breast cancer in 1927, and is buried beside her brother, John William Klumpke, her husband Joseph Jules Dejerine and her mother Dorothea Tolle in Pere Lachaise Cemetery in Paris.

== Honours, societies and awards ==
- The French Biology Society (the first elected female member)
- The French Neurology Society (the first elected female member and the first female president in 1914)
- 1886 Godard Prize of the Academy of Medicine
- 1890 Lallemand Prize of the Academy of Sciences
- Officer of the Legion of Honour
- Knight of the Legion of Honour

In 2026, Augusta Dejerine-Klumpke and her sister Dorothea were announced as part of the 72 historical women in STEM whose names have been proposed to be added to the 72 men already celebrated on the Eiffel Tower. The plan was announced by the Mayor of Paris, Anne Hidalgo following the recommendations of a committee led by Isabelle Vauglin of Femmes et Sciences and Jean-François Martins, representing the operating company which runs the Eiffel Tower.

== In popular culture ==
Klumpke and her sisters - especially the astronomer Dorothea Klumpke - were featured in society articles in newspapers of the early 1900s as members of a "gifted family" and "the most remarkable group of sisters in the world".

Passion Neurologie: Jules et Augusta Dejerine, a book by Michel Fardeau, focuses on the love affair between Augusta Klumpke and Jules Dejerine.

As one of the earliest female neurologists, Klumpke is featured in two neurologically themed educational card games, The Plexus and Endowed Chairs: Neurology.

== Selected works ==
- Des polynévrites en général et des paralysies et atrophies saturnines en particulier: étude clinique et anatomo-pathologique
- Anatomie des Centres Nerveux (with Joseph Jules Dejerine)
- Sémiologie des affections du système nerveux (with Joseph Jules Dejerine)
