= Salon of 1849 =

1849 art exhibition in Paris

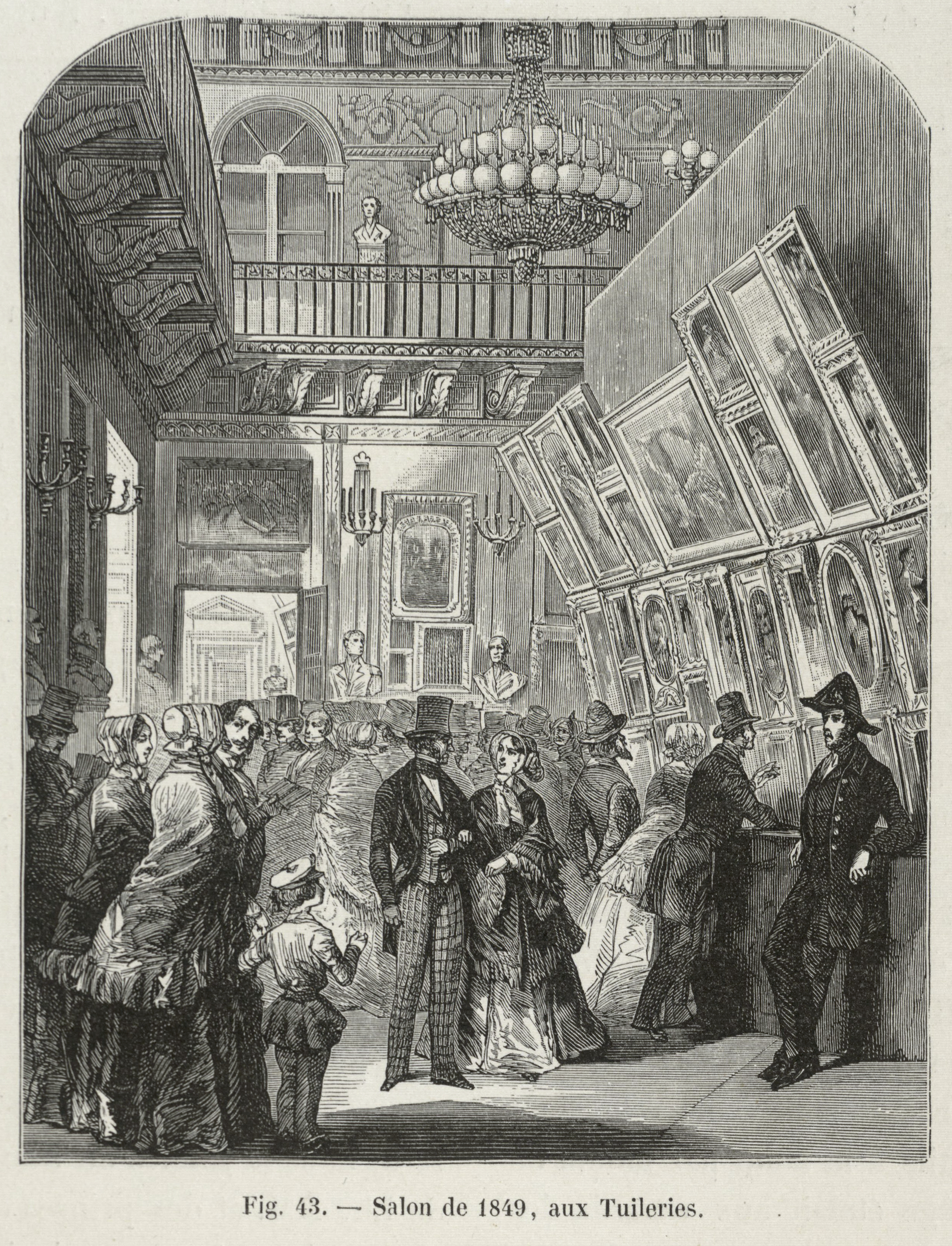
The Salon of 1849 portrayed in a lithograph by Theodor Josef Hubert Hoffbauer

The Salon of 1849 was an art exhibition held in Paris. It was the first to be located at the Tuileries Palace, rather than the traditional venue of the Salon at the Louvre. It was staged during the French Republic which had been established following the Revolution of 1848. The Tuileries were a historic royal residence, and had before the revolution belonged to the now deposed Louis Philippe I.

The rules of submission were made more open to artists. A major beneficiary of this was the realist painter Gustave Courbet whose After Dinner at Ornans won a gold medal. Under the July Monarchy Salon juries had rejected all but three of his twenty two submissions. The young Pierre-Charles Comte exhibited a history painting The Coronation of Inês de Castro in 1361 featuring the fourteenth century Portuguese queen Inês de Castro. Rosa Bonheur displayed a rural scene Ploughing in the Nivernais. Another realist painter François Bonvin submitted three paintings.

The landscape artist Théodore Rousseau submitted his first work since one of his entries had been refused at the Salon of 1836. Adolphe Pierre Leleux produced a work featuring stonebreakers, a year before Courbet's more famous The Stone Breakers. In sculpture James Pradier exhibited the Neoclassical statue Chloris Caressed by Zephyrus. The romantic painter Eugène Delacroix exhibited four paintings. These included a second version of his Women of Algiers in their Apartment along with Othello and Desdemona along with two neo-Baroque still lifes Basket of Flowers and Basket of Flowers and Fruit.

== Gallery ==
=== Paintings ===
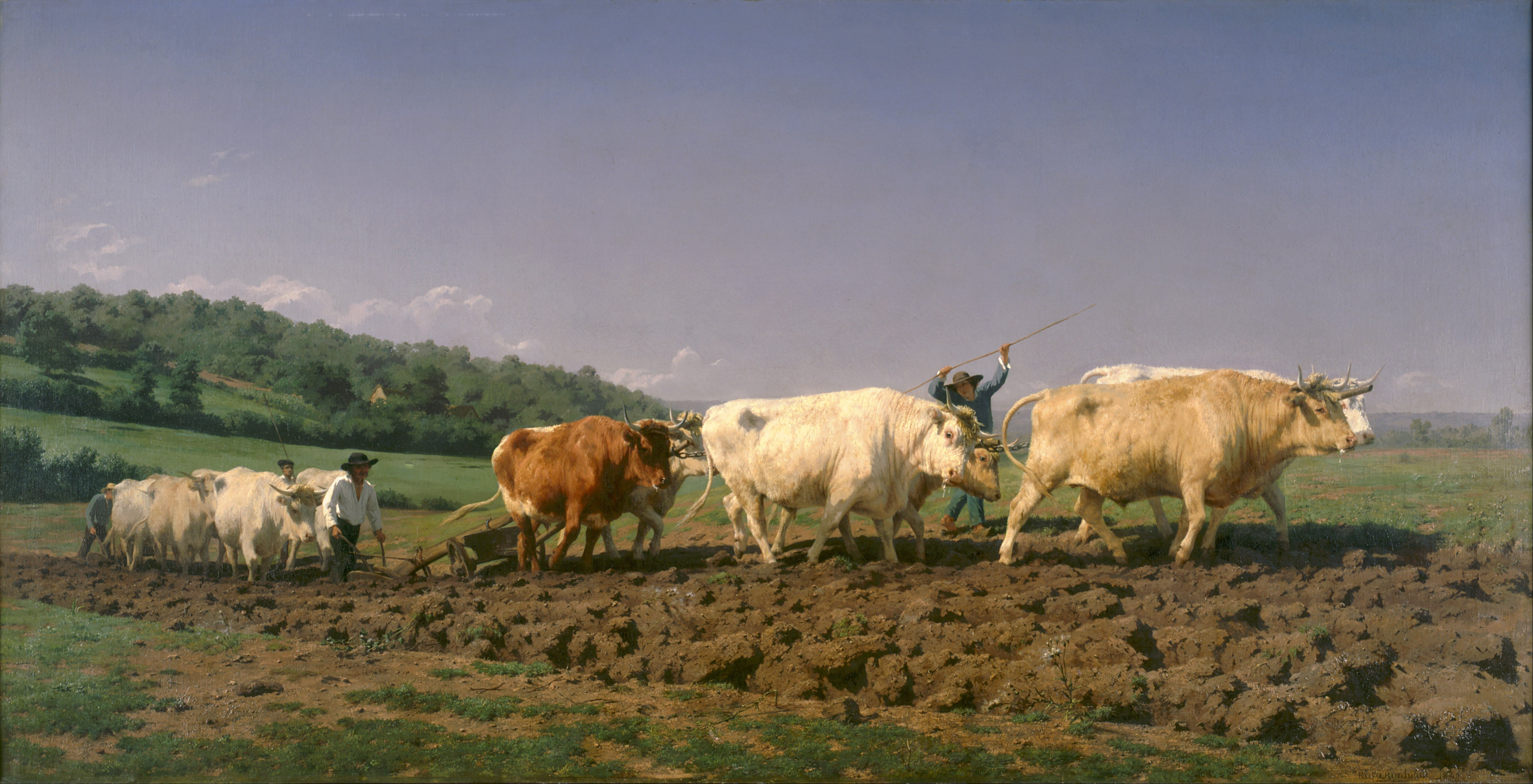
Ploughing in the Nivernais by Rosa Bonheur

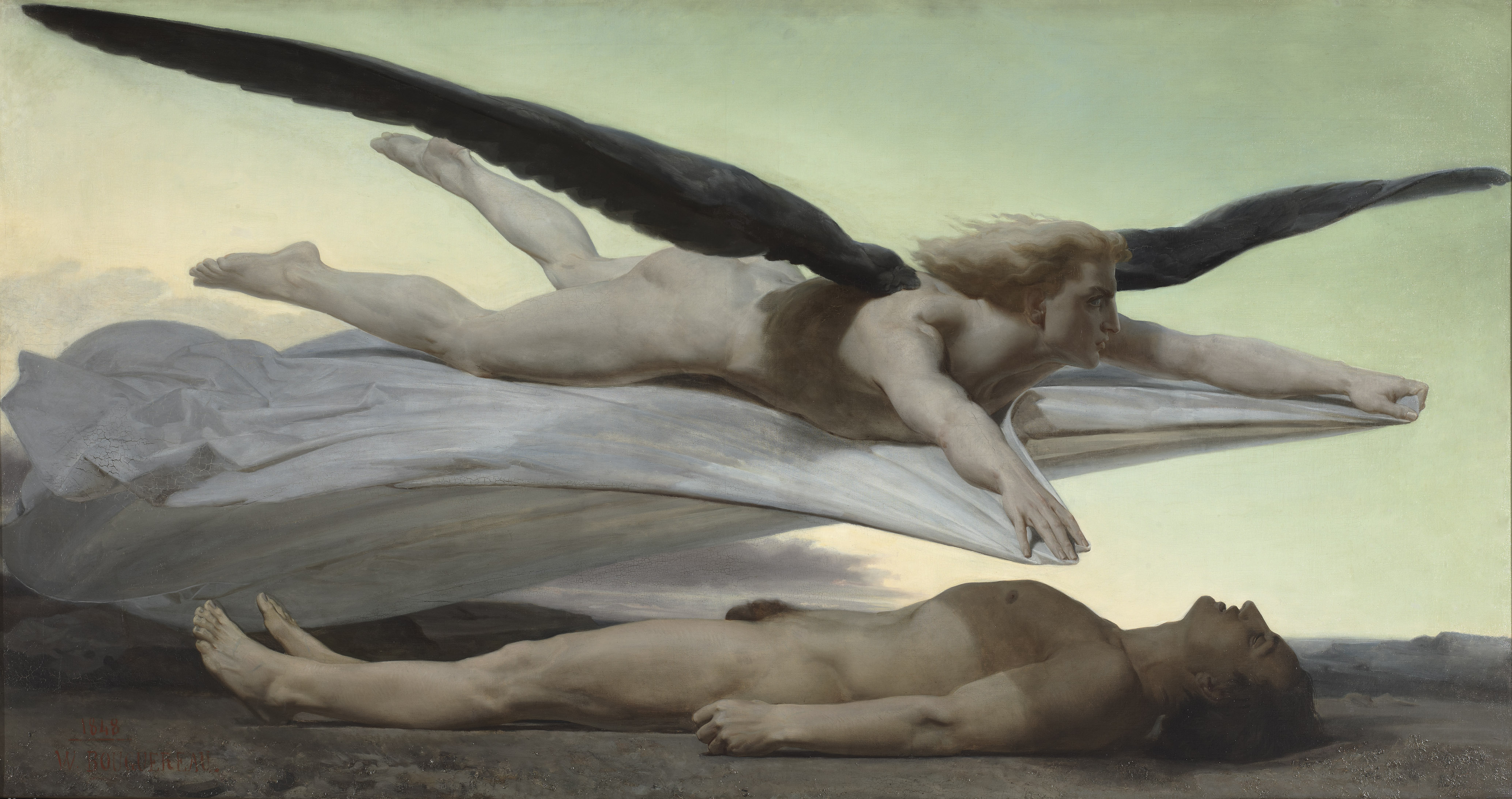
Equality Before Death by William-Adolphe Bouguereau

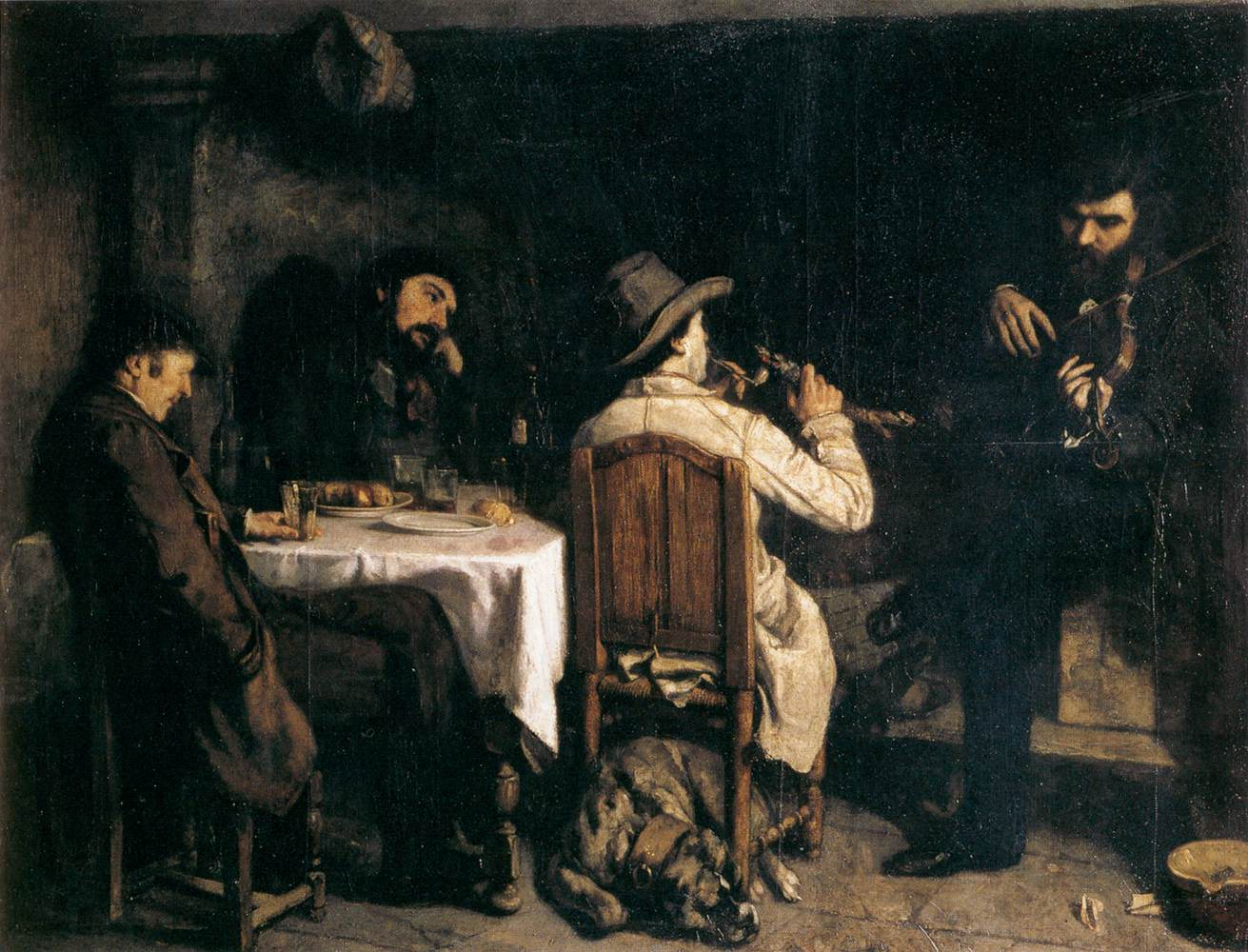
After Dinner at Ornans by Gustave Courbet

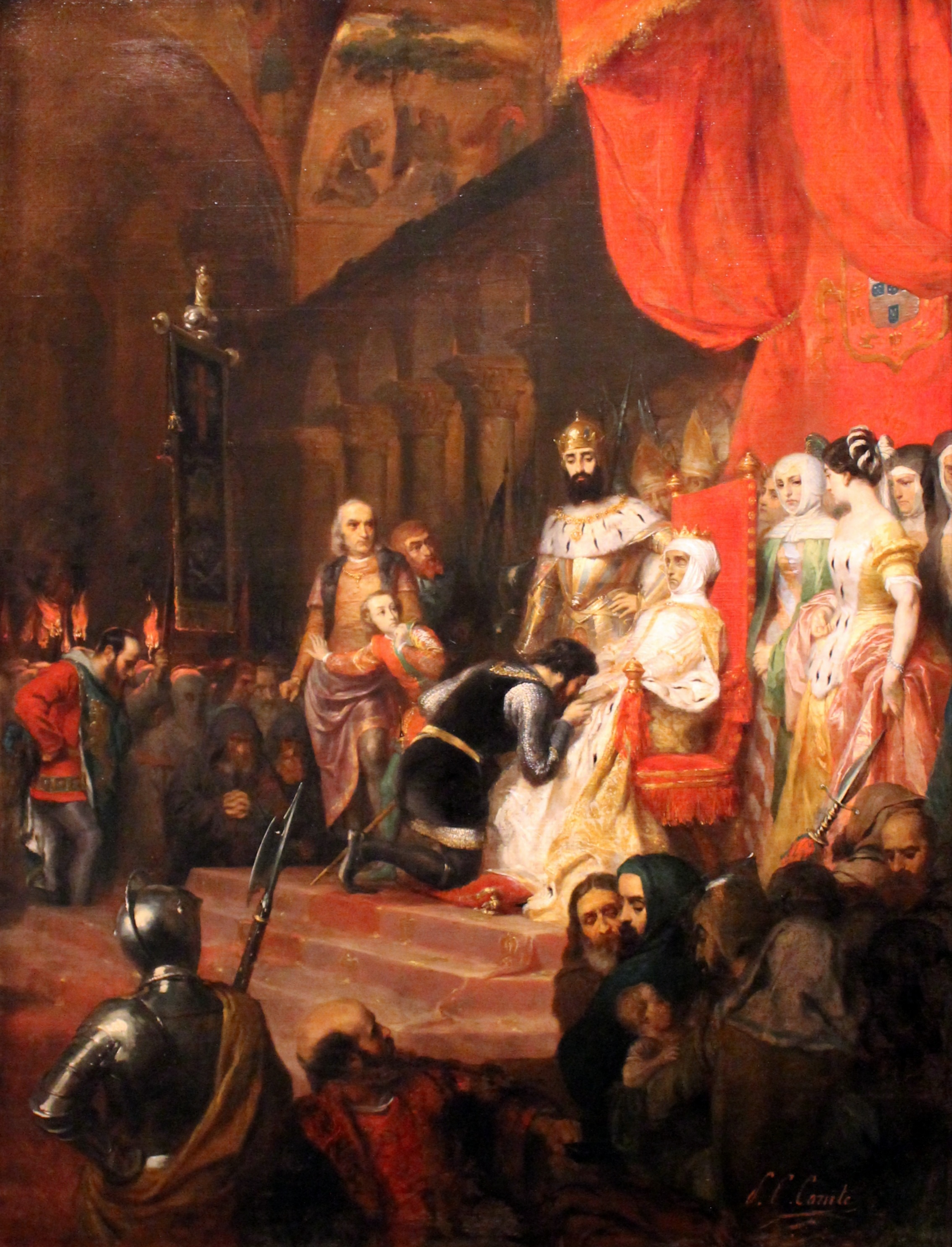
The Coronation of Inês de Castro in 1361 by Pierre-Charles Comte

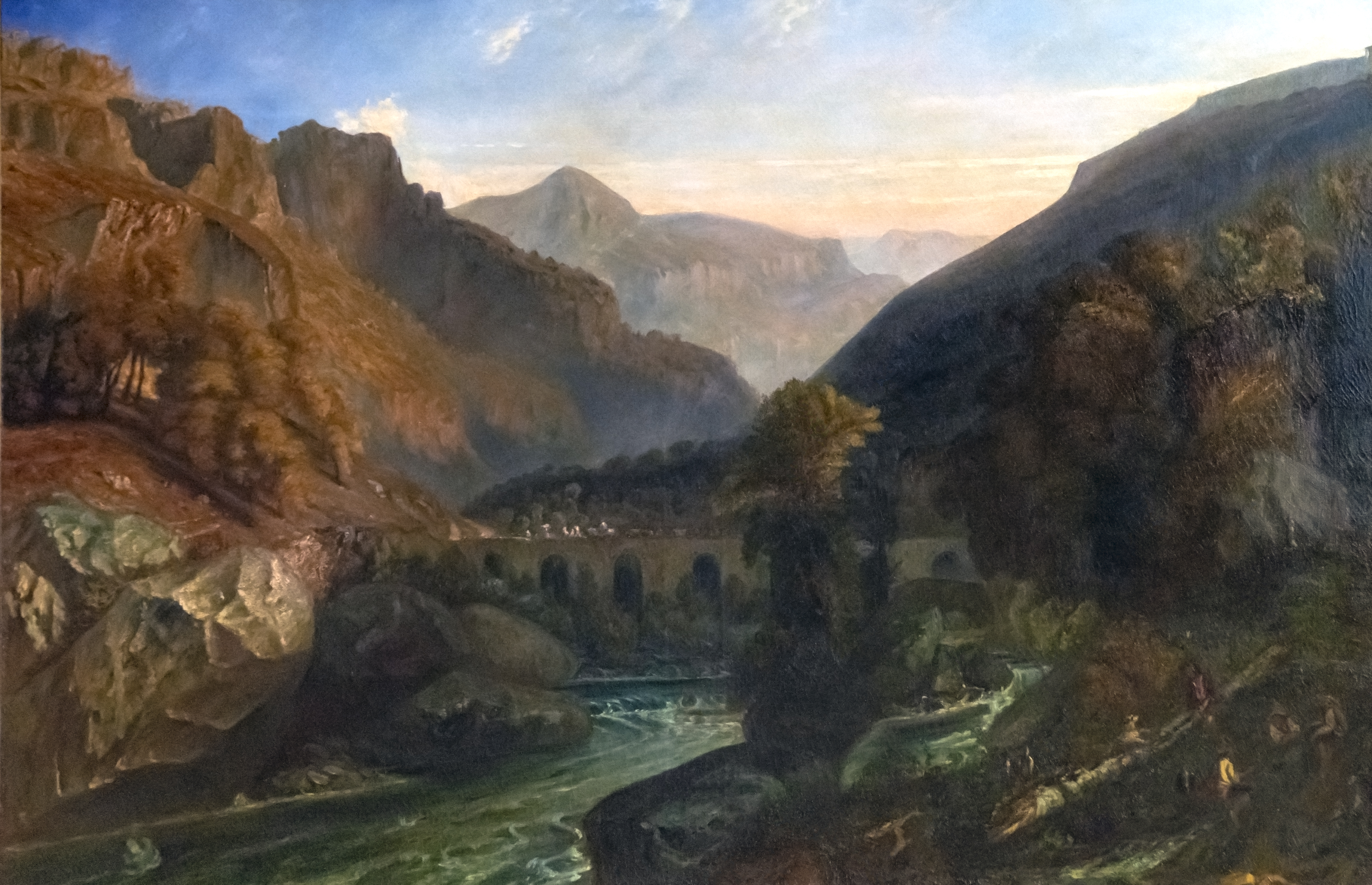
A View of Tende by Paul Huet

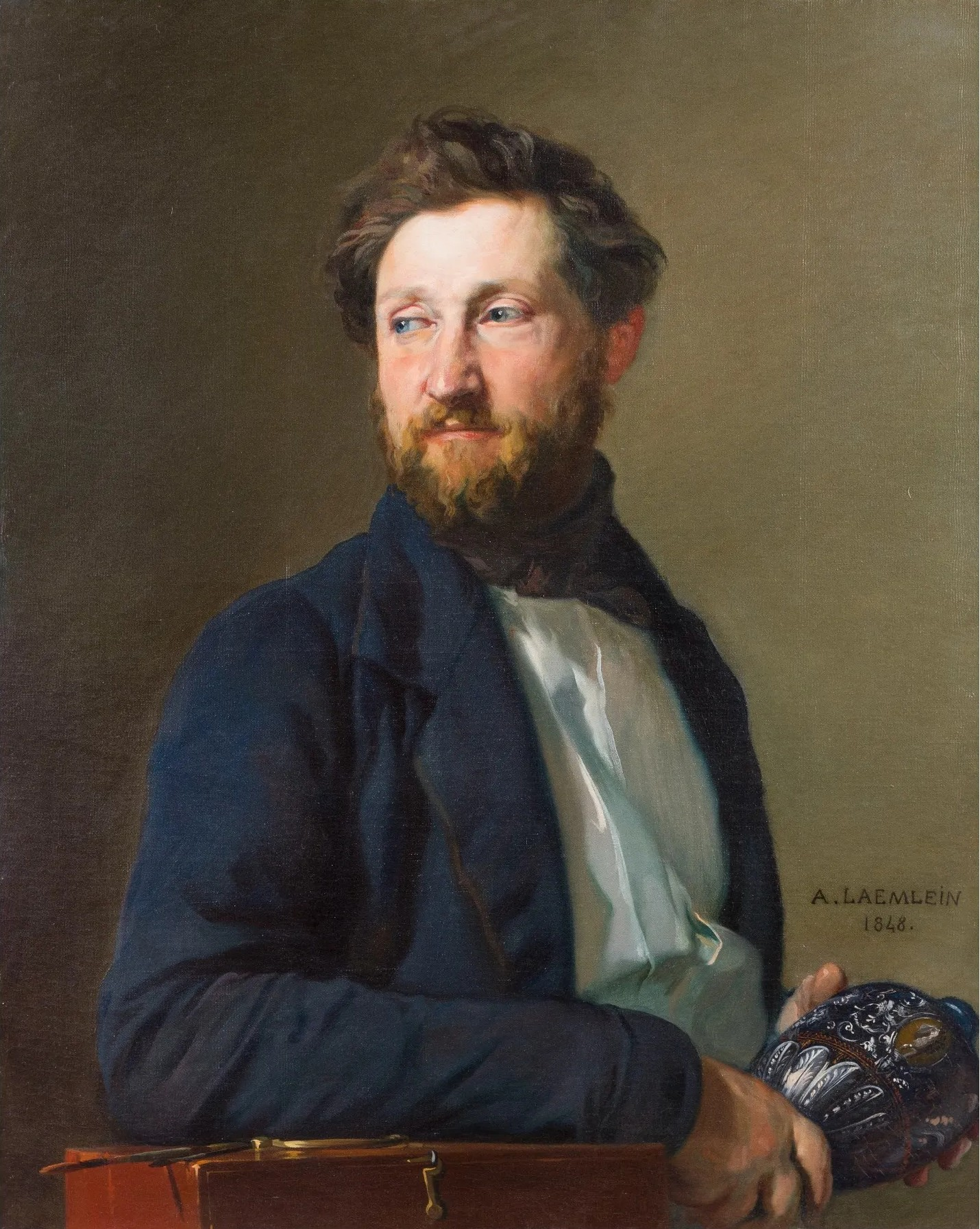
Portrait of Jacob Meyer-Heine by Alexandre Laemlein

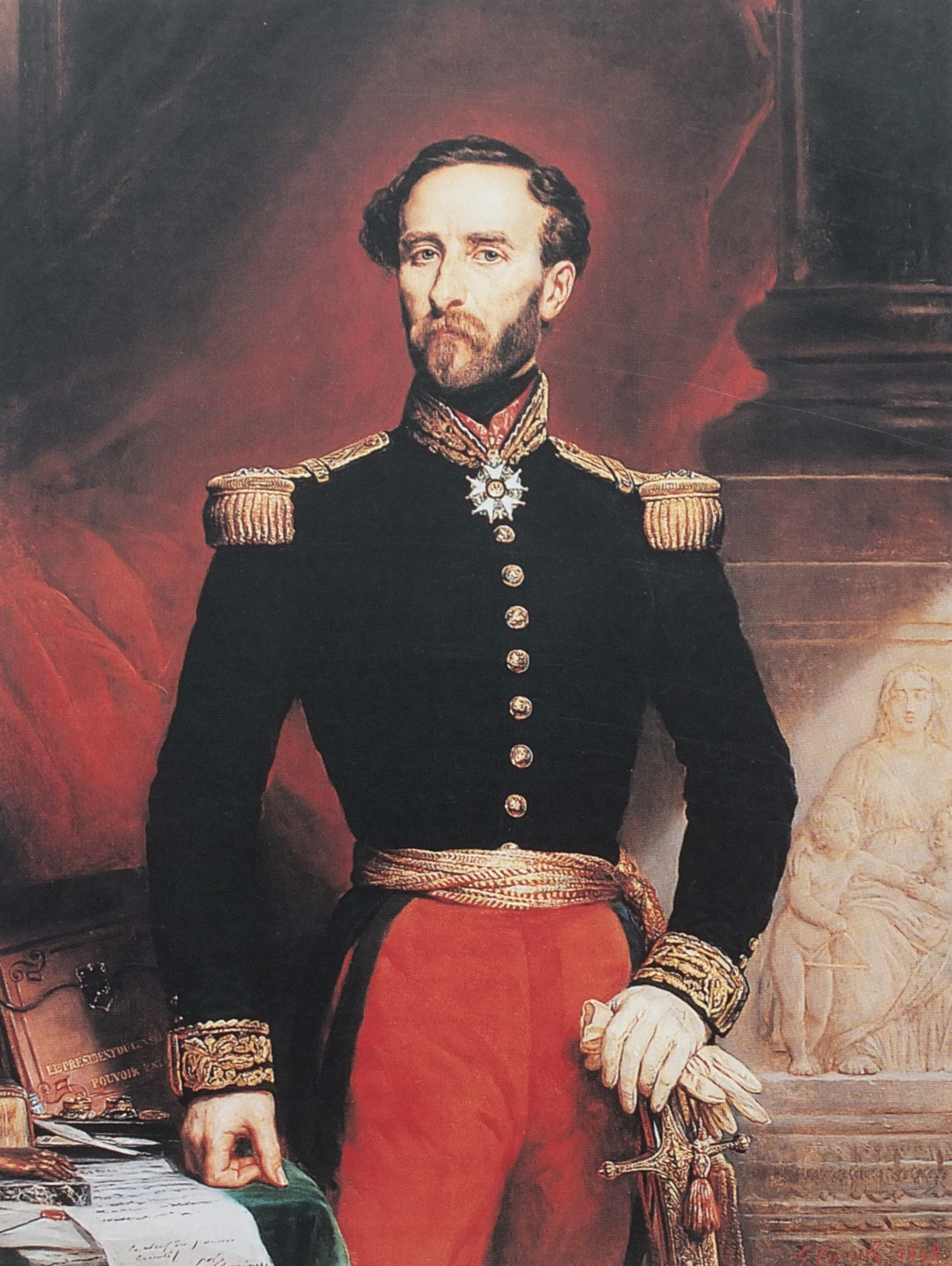
Portrait of Louis-Eugène Cavaignac by François-Gabriel Lépaulle

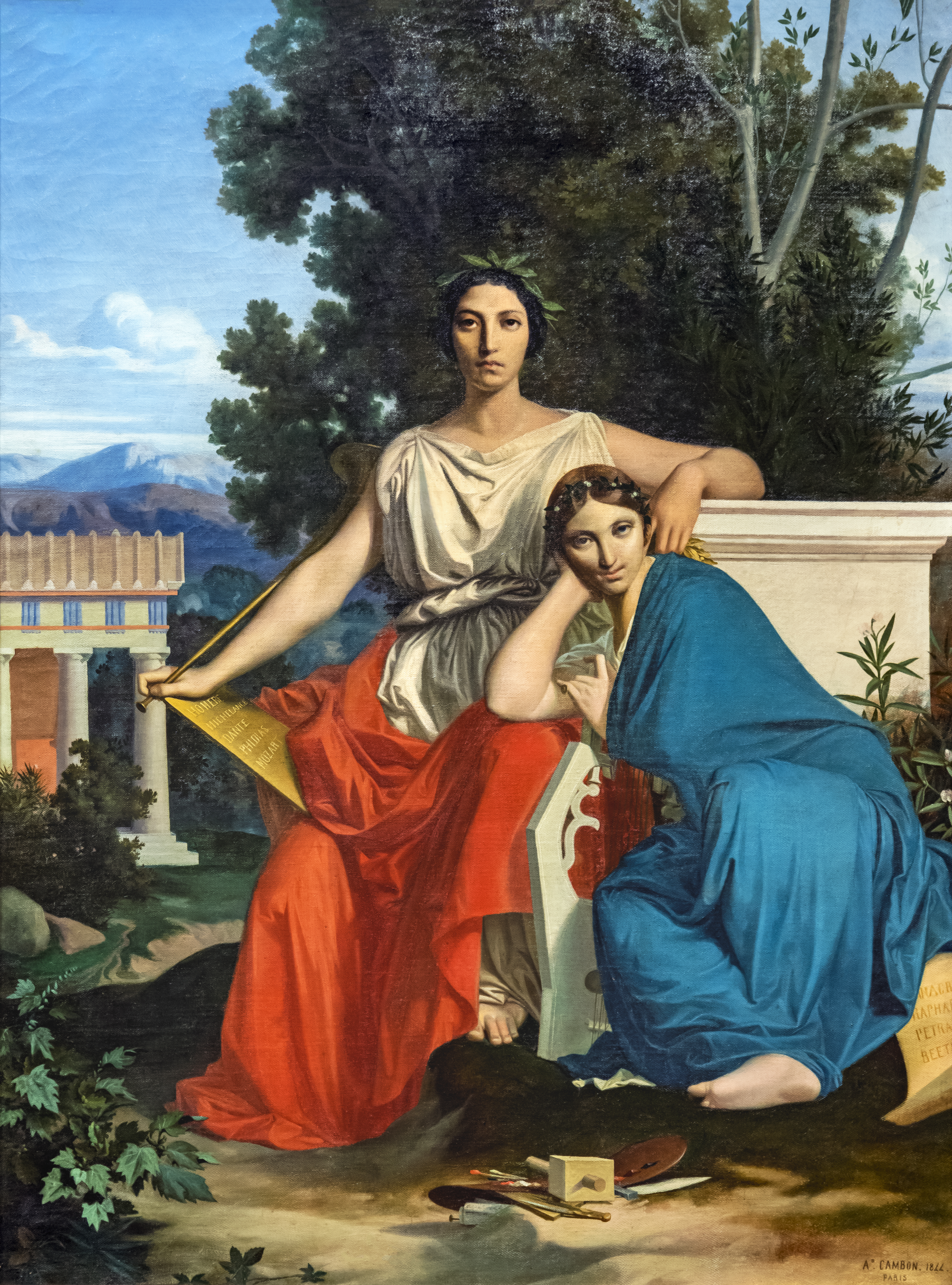
Poetry of Glory and Poetry of Love by Armand Cambon

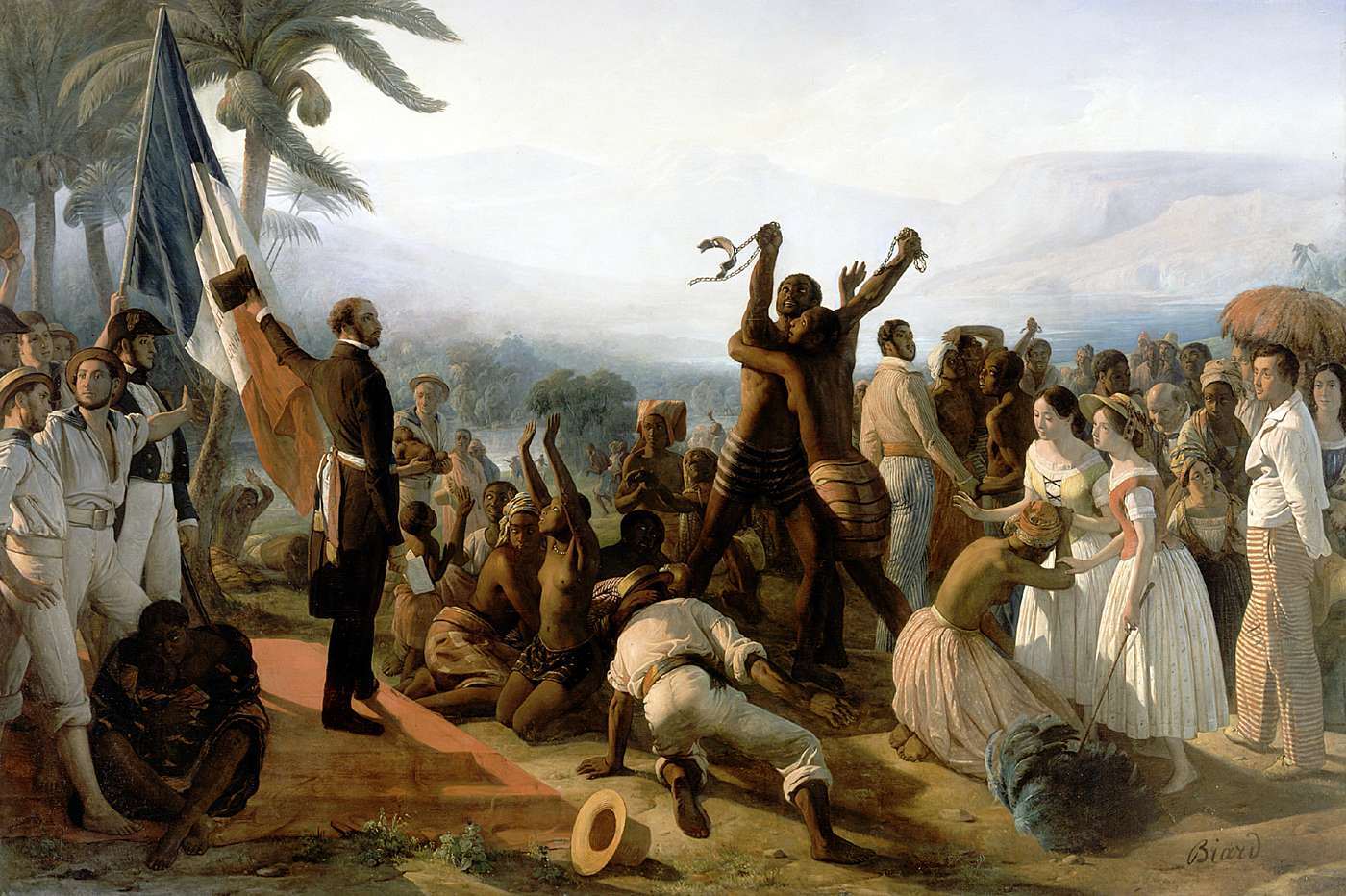
Proclamation of the Abolition of Slavery in the French Colonies, 27 April 1848 by François-Auguste Biard

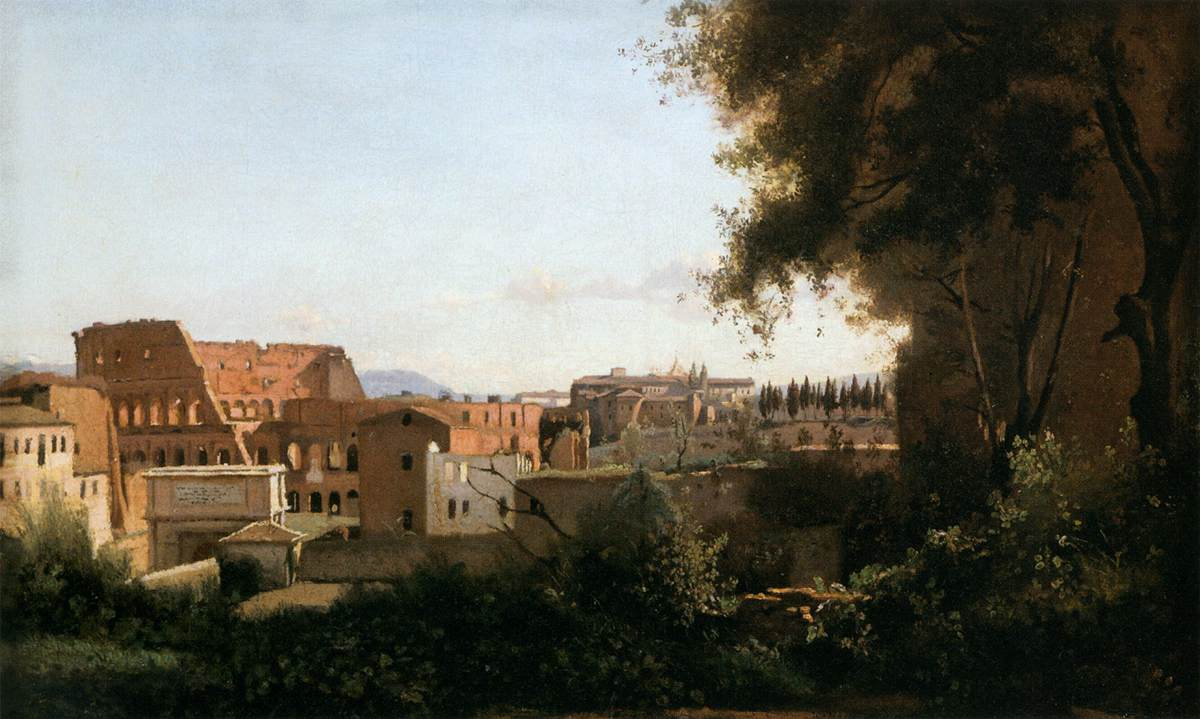
The Coliseum Seen from the Farnese Gardens by Jean-Baptiste-Camille Corot

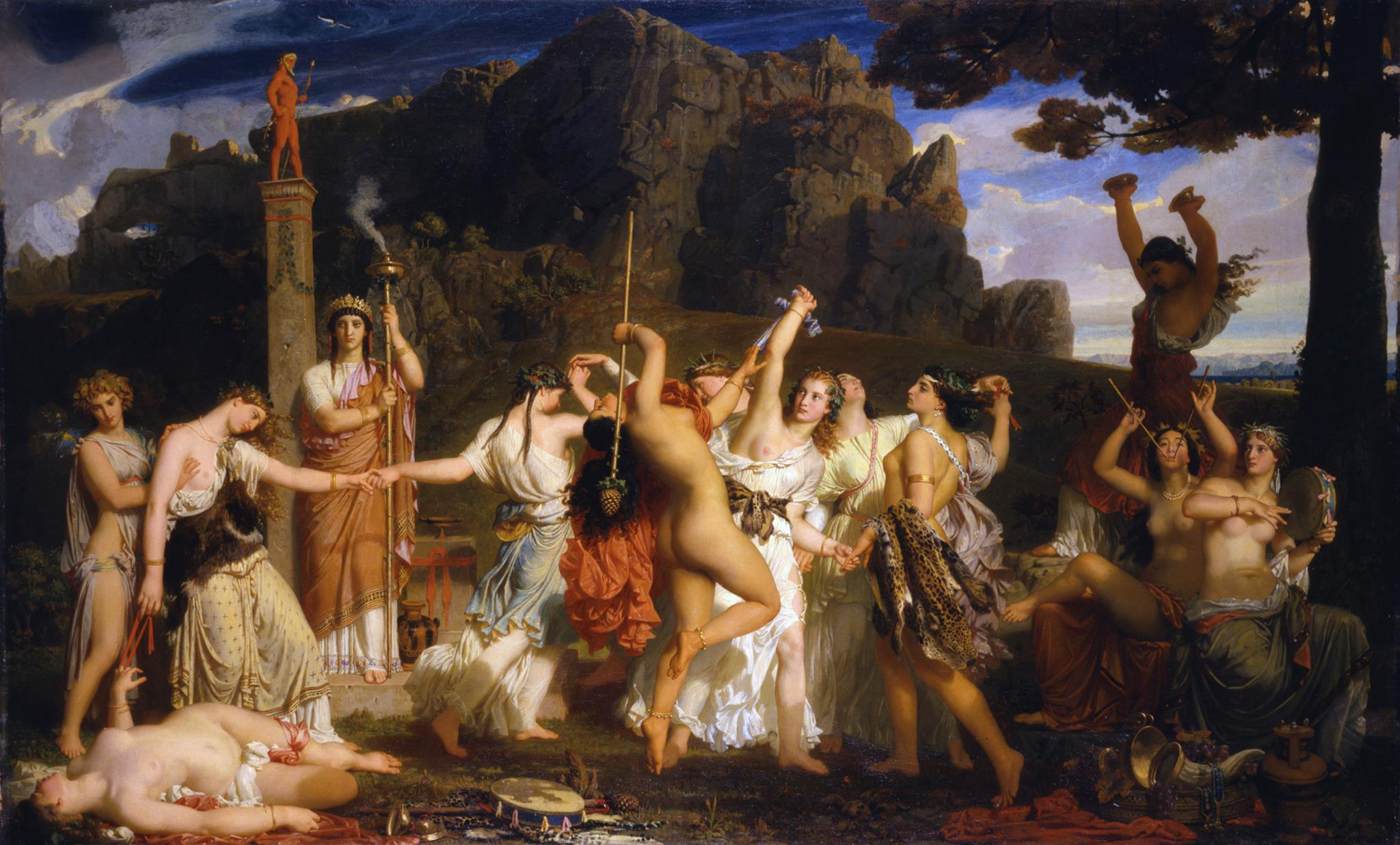
The Dance of the Bacchantes by Charles Gleyre

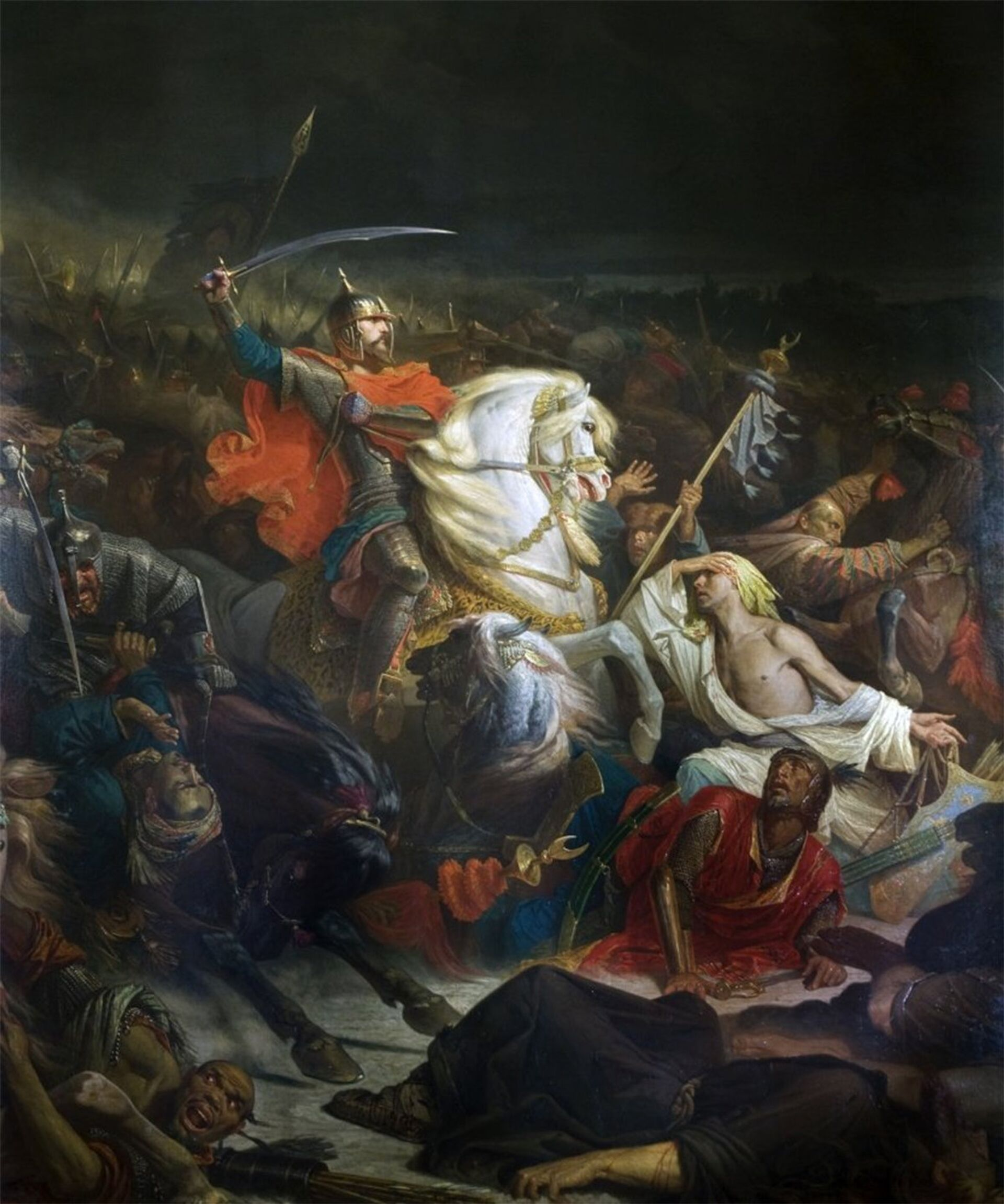
Dmitry Donskoy at the Battle of Kulikovo by Adolphe Yvon

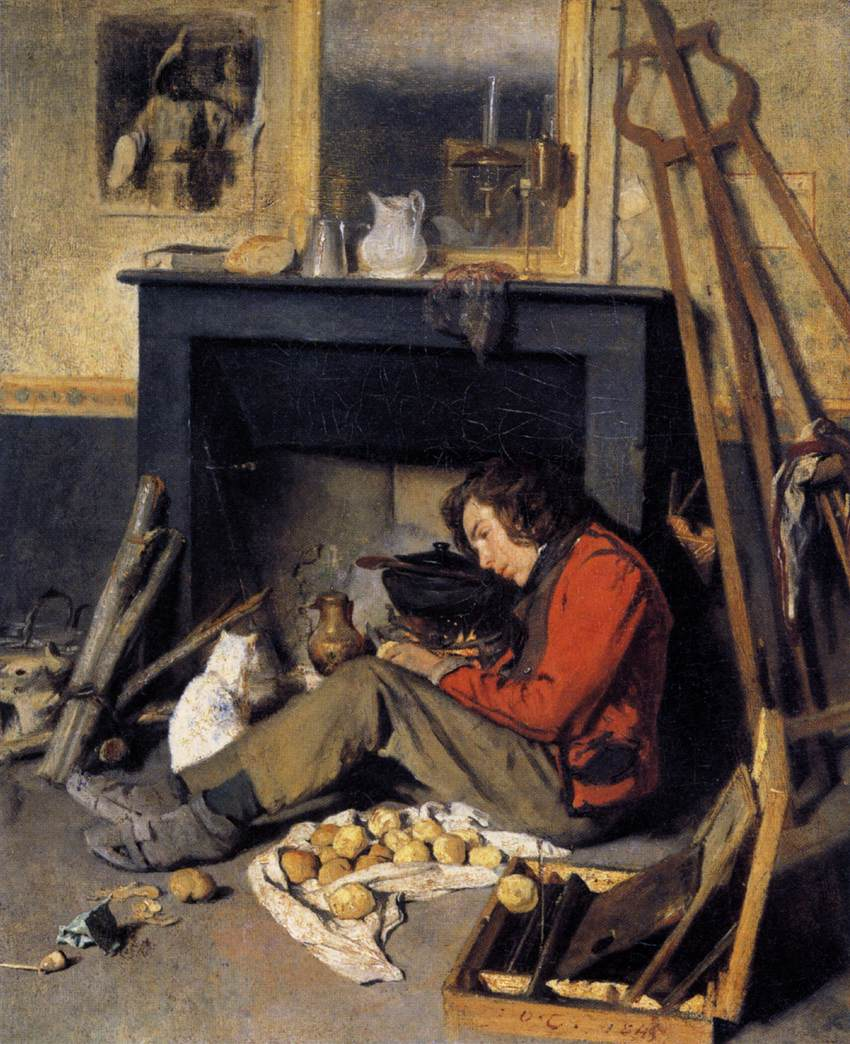
Studio Interior by Octave Tassaert

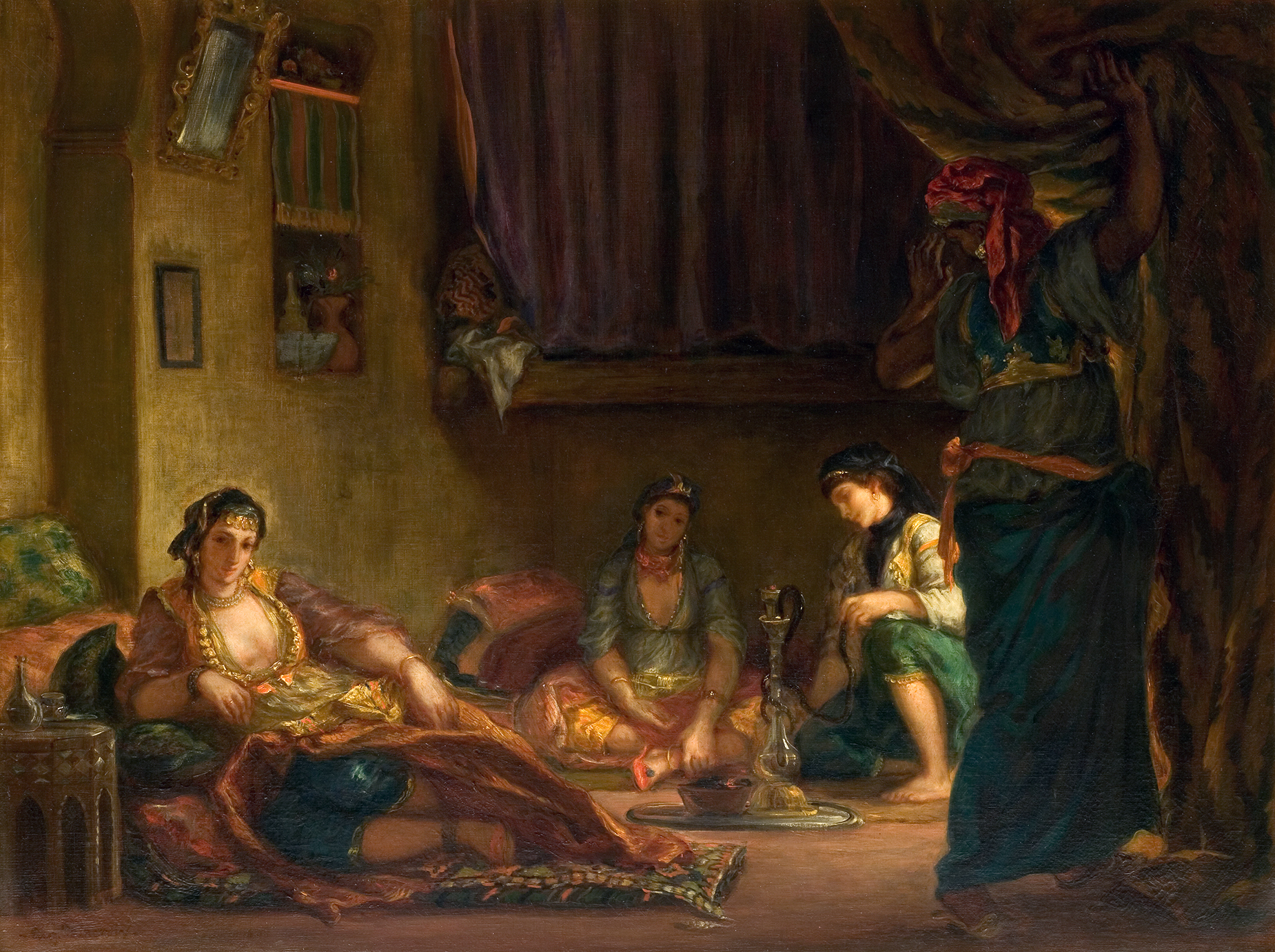
Women of Algiers in their Apartment by Eugène Delacroix

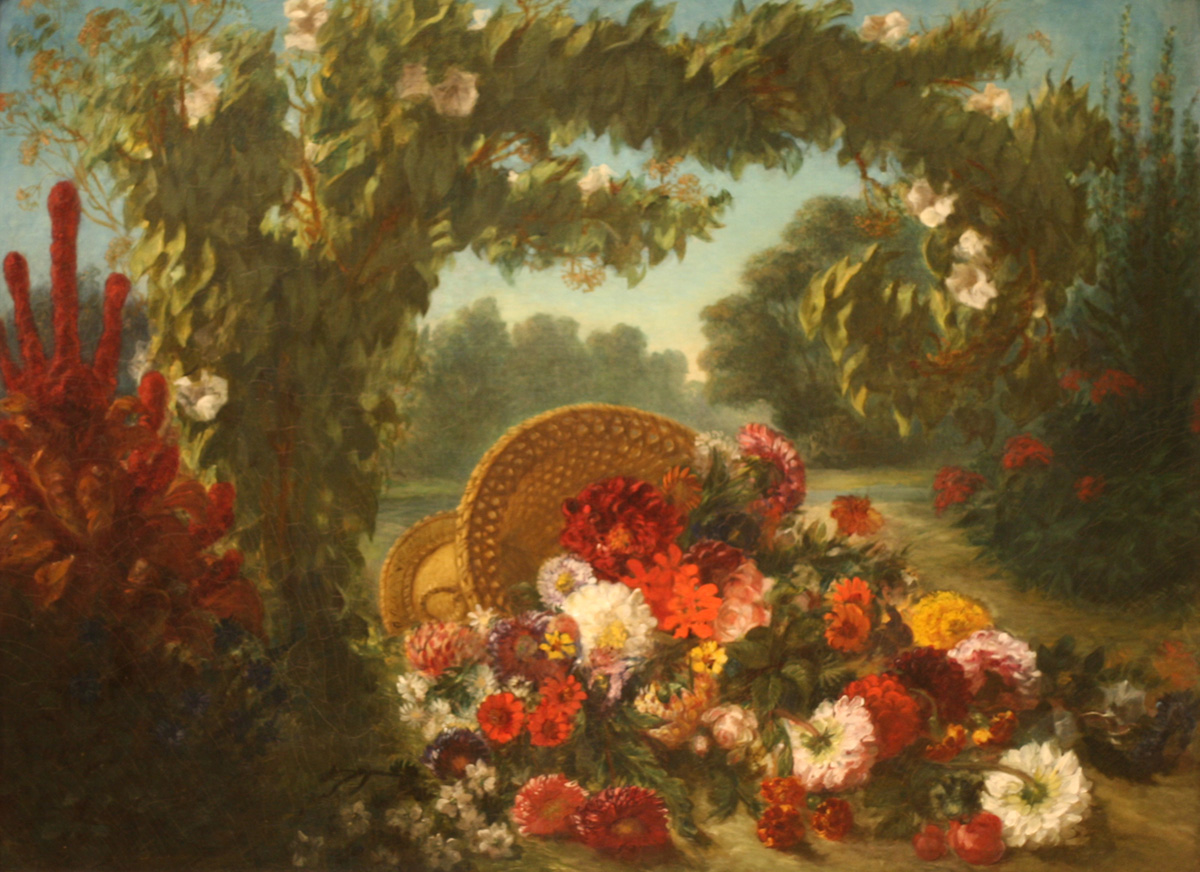
Basket of Flowers by Eugène Delacroix

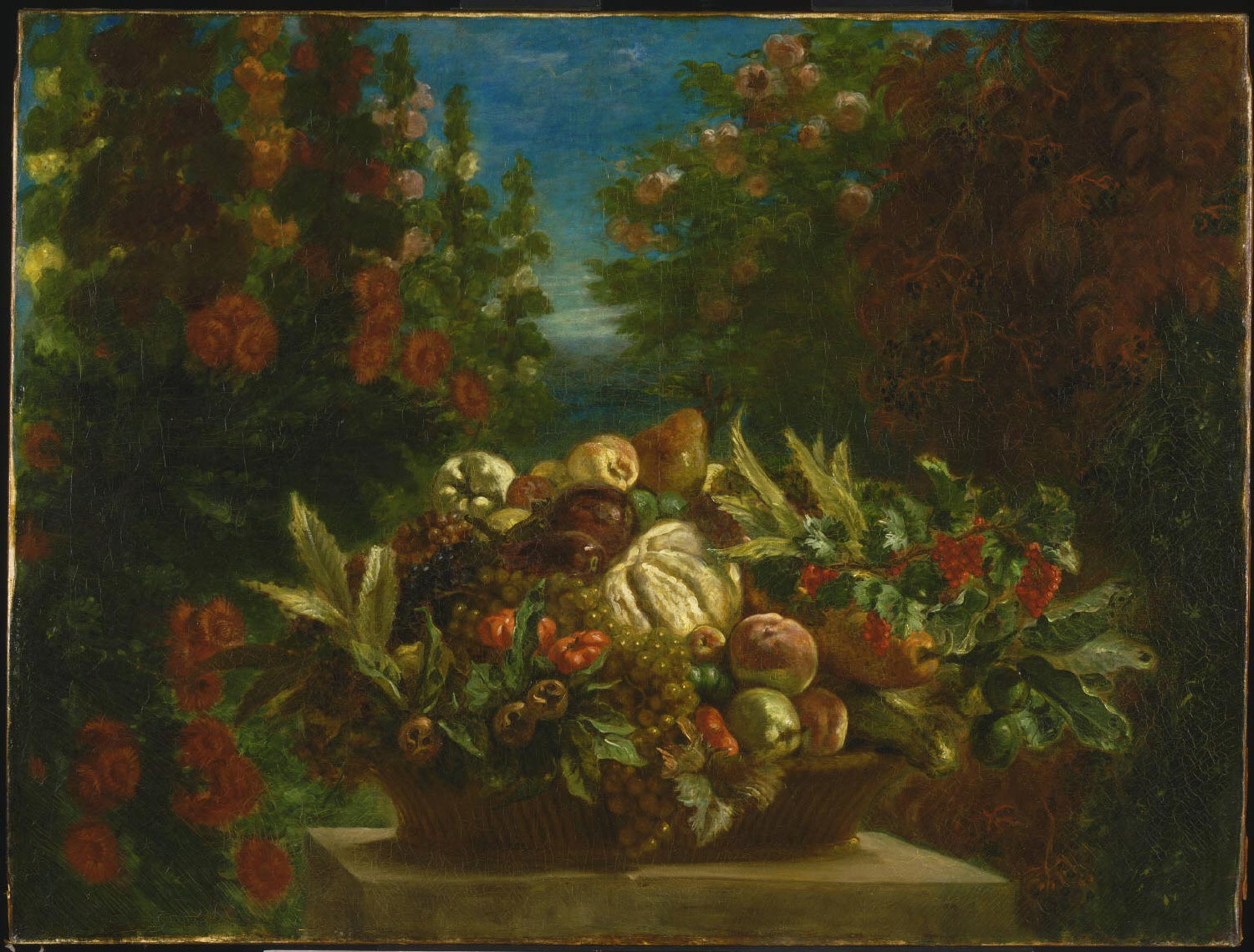
Basket of Flowers and Fruit by Eugène Delacroix

=== Sculptures ===
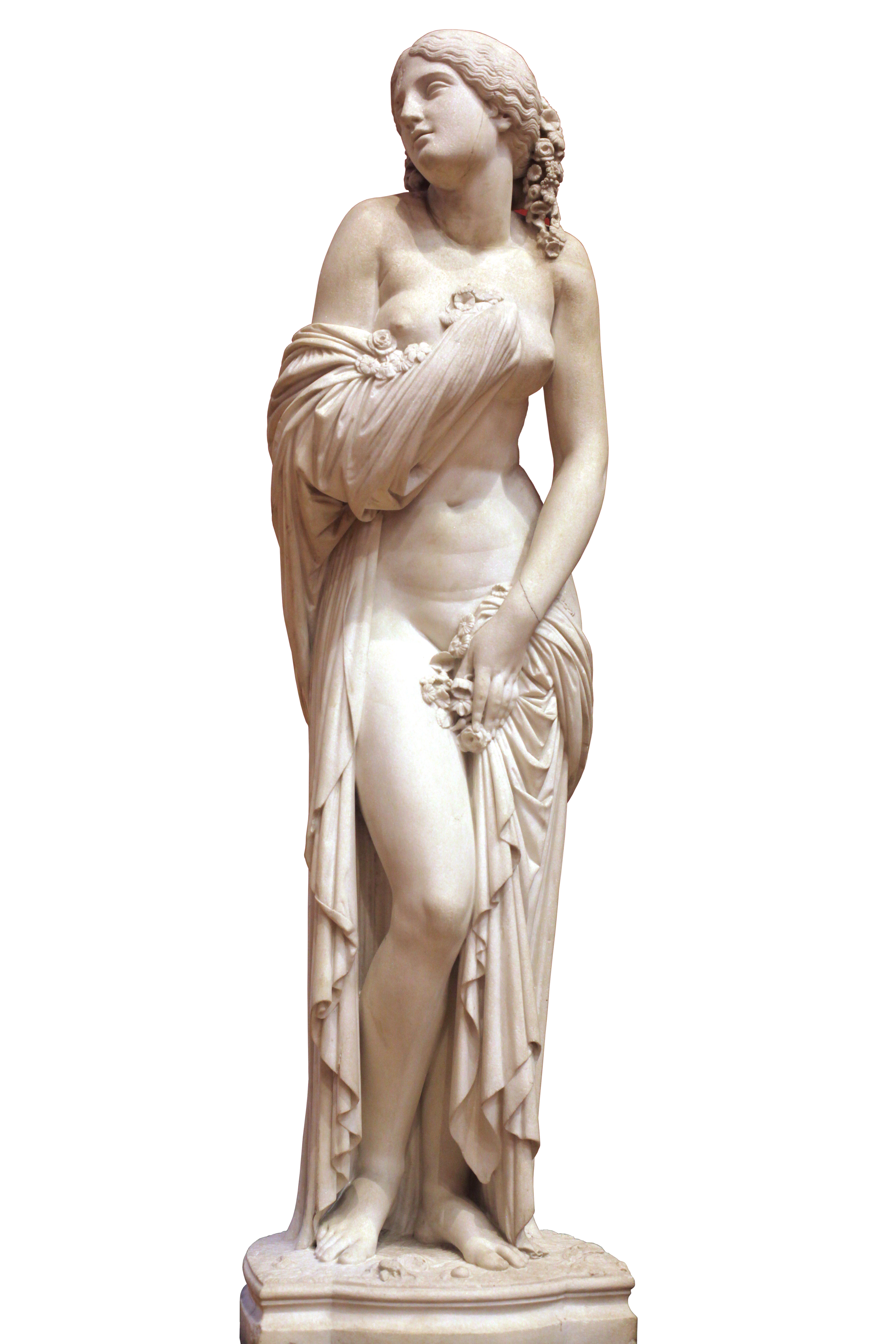
Chloris Caressed by Zephyrus by James Pradier

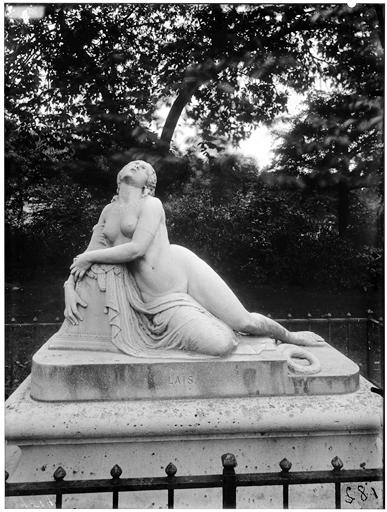
The Death of Laïs by Roland Mathieu-Meusnier

== See also ==
- Category:Artworks exhibited at the Salon of 1849

== Bibliography ==
- Allard, Sébastien & Fabre, Côme. Delacroix. Metropolitan Museum of Art, 2018.
- Bermingham, Ann. Landscape and Ideology: The English Rustic Tradition, 1740-1860. University of California Press, 1986.
- Brooke-Hitching, Edward. The Madman's Gallery: The Strangest Paintings, Sculptures and Other Curiosities from the History of Art. Chronicle Books, 2023.
- Finke, Ulrich (ed.) French 19th Century Painting and Literature. Manchester University Press, 1972.
- Gildea, Robert. Children of the Revolution: The French, 1799-1914. Harvard University Press, 2008.
- Jackson, Penelope. The Art of Copying Art. Springer Nature, 2022.
- Norman, Geraldine. Nineteenth-century Painters and Painting: A Dictionary. University of California Press, 1977.
- Smee, Sebastian. Paris in Ruins: The Siege, the Commune and the Birth of Impressionism. Simon and Schuster, 2024.
