= Ploughing in the Nivernais =

Painting by Rosa Bonheur

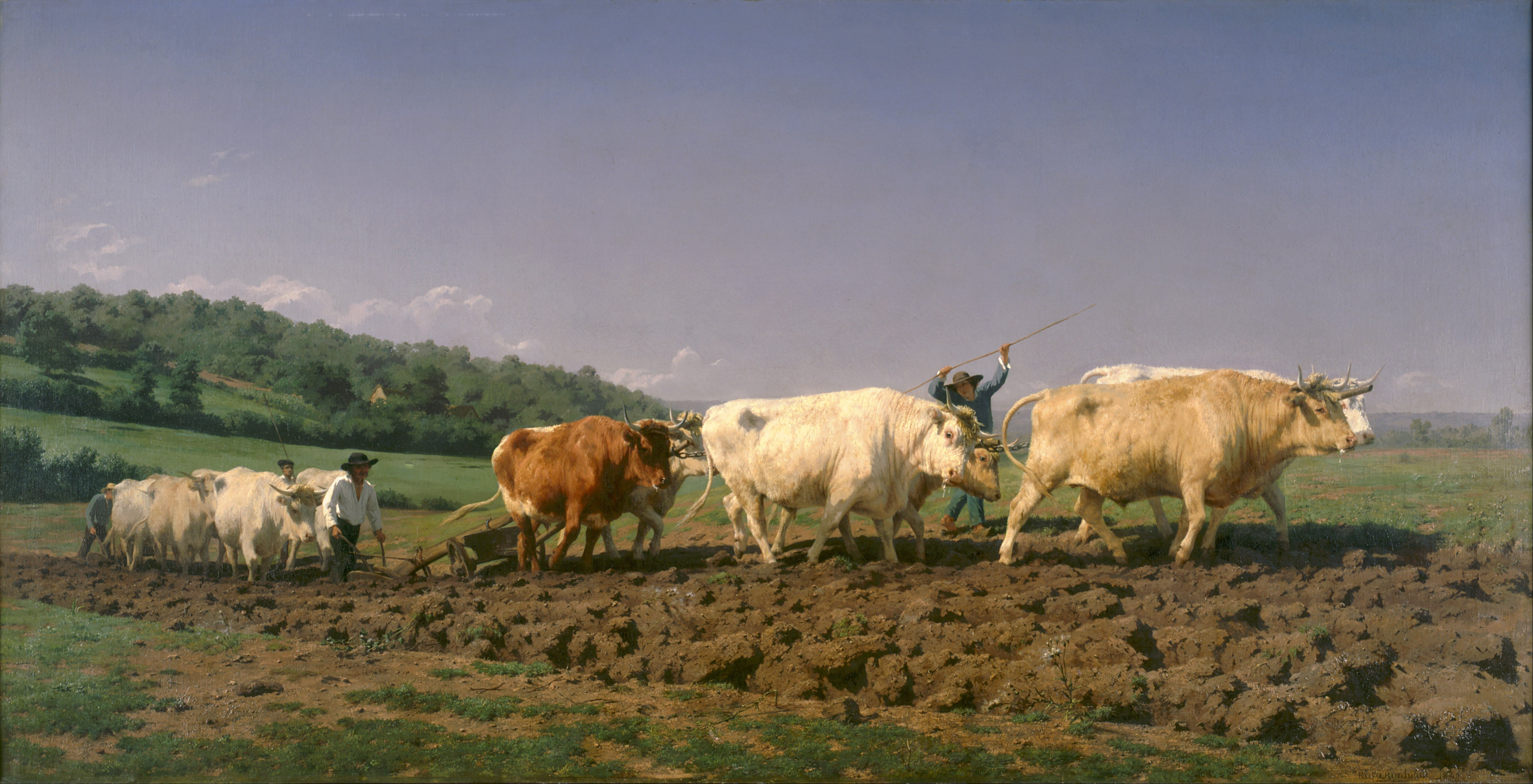
- Artist: Rosa Bonheur
- Year: 1849
- Medium: Oil on canvas
- Dimensions: 133 cm × 260 cm (52 in × 100 in)
- Location: Musée d'Orsay, Paris

Ploughing in the Nivernais (French: Labourage nivernais), also known as Oxen ploughing in Nevers or Plowing in Nivernais, is an 1849 painting by French artist Rosa Bonheur. It depicts two teams of oxen ploughing the land, and expresses deep commitment to the land; it may have been inspired by the opening scene of George Sand's 1846 novel La Mare au Diable. Commissioned by the government and winner of a First Medal at the Salon of 1849, today it is held in the Musée d'Orsay in Paris.

== Depiction ==
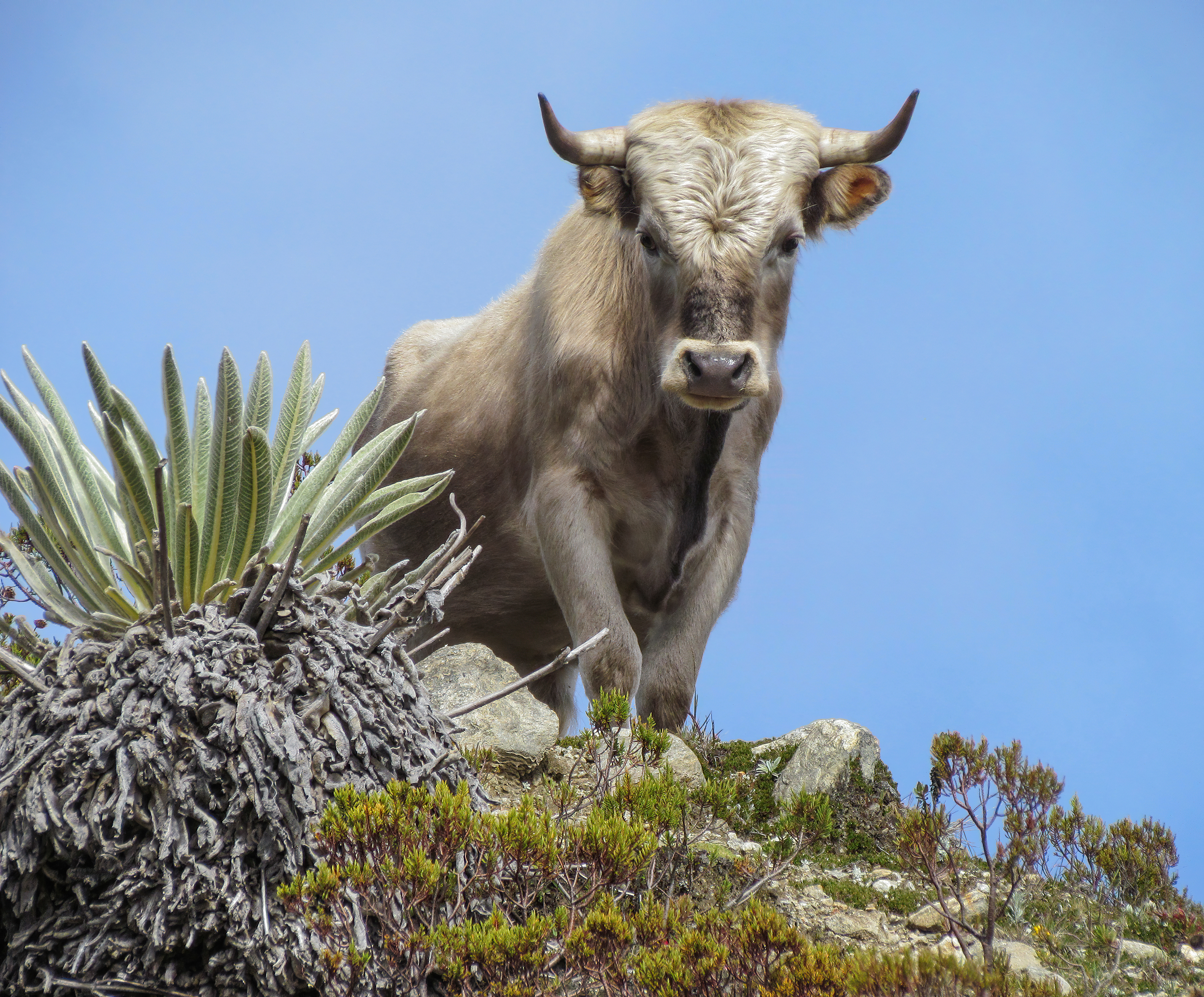
Charolais bull

The Nivernais, the area around Nevers, was known for its Charolais cattle, which were to play an important role in the agricultural revolution that took place in the area in the nineteenth century. Rosa Bonheur gained a reputation painting animals, and Ploughing in the Nivernais features twelve Charolais oxen, in two groups of six. On a sunny autumn day they plough the land; this is the sombrage, the first stage of soil preparation in the fall, which opens up the soil to aeration during the winter. Humans play a minor role in the painting—the farmer is almost completely hidden behind his animals. The freshly-ploughed land is prominent in the foreground, and the landscape behind is basking in sunlight. The painting's clarity and light resembles that of the Dutch paintings (esp. by Paulus Potter) which Bonheur had studied as part of her education.

According to Albert Boime, the painting should be seen as a glorification of peasant life and its ancient traditions; he places it in the context of the revolutionary year 1848, when cities were the scene of chaos and strife.

== History ==
Rosa Bonheur made the painting by commission of the French government for 3000 francs; it was shown in the Salon in 1849, where it won her a First Medal. N. D'Anvers repeats an apparently well-known story, that it was inspired by the opening scene of George Sand's novel La Mare au Diable (1846), which features oxen ploughing a landscape with the author's commentary, "a noble subject for a painter". The comparison with Sand is amplified in an article in the July 1899 edition of The Literary Digest, which referred to the painting as a "pictorial translation of the novel". Initially intended for the museum in Lyon, it was instead exhibited in the Musée du Luxembourg in Paris and was a featured exhibit at the 1889 World Fair. The painting was moved to the Louvre and afterward to the Musée d'Orsay. She made a number of copies, one of which is in the John and Mable Ringling Museum of Art.

== Reception and legacy ==
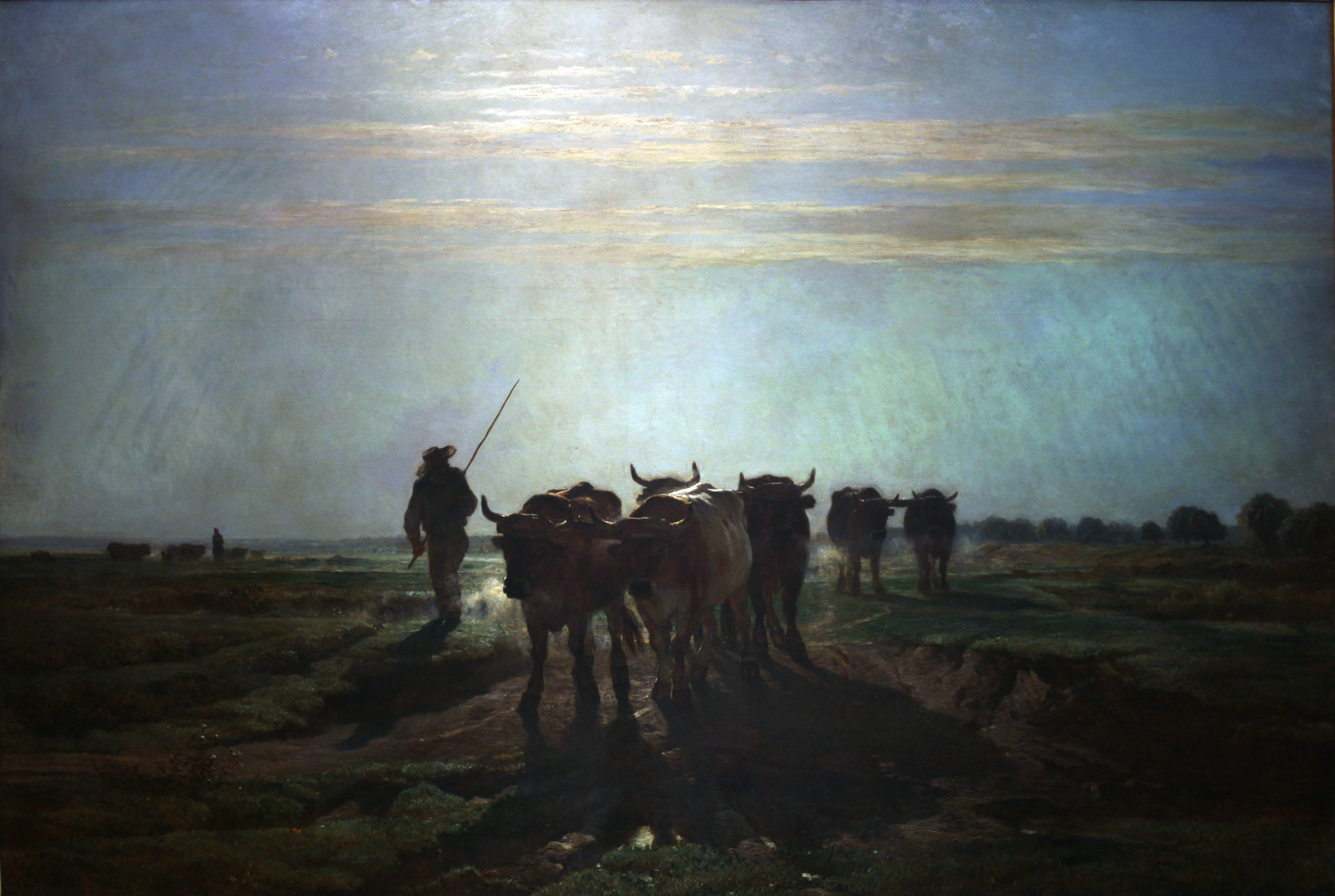
Constant Troyon, Boeufs allant au labour, effet de matin ("Oxen going to work, effect of morning"), 1855, Musée d'Orsay.

Rosa Bonheur was claimed by New York Times critic Mary Blume as "the most famous woman painter of her time, perhaps of all time". Besides The Horse Fair, Ploughing in the Nivernais is one of Bonheur's best-known paintings, and somewhat resembles Oxen going to work by Constant Troyon. An early admirer was Anna Elizabeth Klumpke, who copied the work in the Luxembourg before beginning a long acquaintance with the artist. George du Maurier's 1894 novel Trilby mentions such a scene, of people copying Ploughing in the Nivernais and other works in the Luxembourg. It is one of the paintings singled out by Margaret Addison on her European tour in 1900, though philosopher Frédéric Paulhan in L'Esthétique du paysage (1913) was less impressed; Paulhan argued that good art simplifies, and that Ploughing in the Nivernais does not do so, spoiling it with the execution of the clods of earth. Those clods and the greenery were done, according to Bonheur, in a "heartwarming" way, according to Paulhan; she did not create, but merely reproduced, since on the one hand she was too complete by providing too much insignificant detail, and on the other hand she weakened nature by reproducing it. Paul Cézanne was also unimpressed, commenting that "it is horribly like the real thing".

In 1978 a critic described the work as "entirely forgotten and rarely dragged out from oblivion"; that year it was part of a series of paintings sent to China by the French government for an exhibition titled "The French Landscape and Peasant, 1820–1905". Mary Blume, in 1997, said "the work [Horse Fair as well as Ploughing] is more careful than inspired, affectionate but not sentimental, a doughty celebration of working animals".

== See also ==
- France profonde
