= After Dinner at Ornans =

Painting by Gustave Courbet

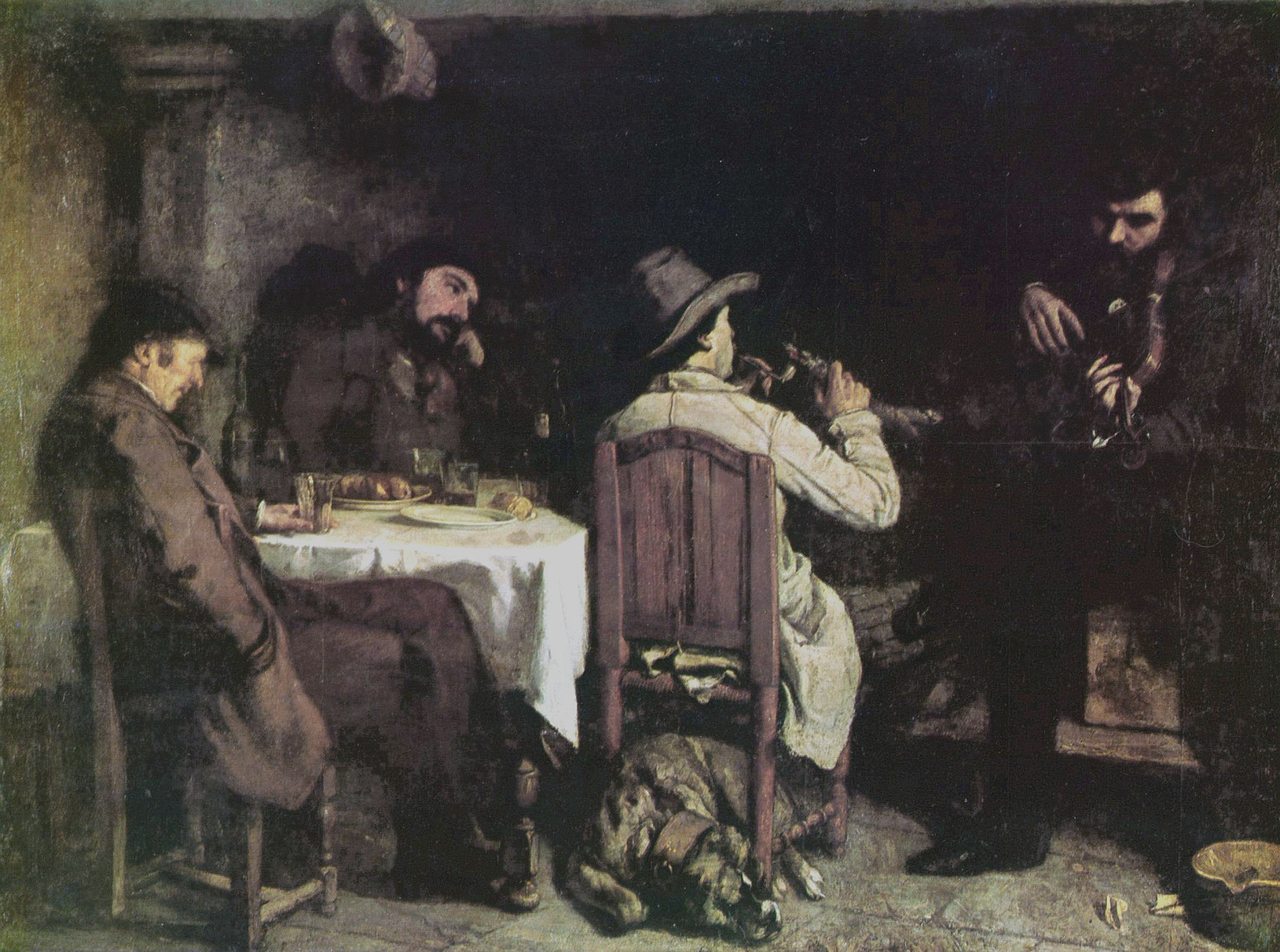
- Artist: Gustave Courbet
- Year: 1848–1849
- Medium: Oil on canvas
- Dimensions: 195 cm × 257 cm (77 in × 101 in)
- Location: Palais des Beaux-Arts de Lille, Lille

After Dinner at Ornans (French: L'Après-dînée à Ornans) is an oil-on-canvas painting by the French Realist artist Gustave Courbet, painted in winter 1848–1849 in Ornans.

It was the first of Courbet's imposing paintings of Ornans subjects; others include The Stone Breakers and A Burial at Ornans. After Dinner at Ornans shows the influence of earlier French masters of genre painting such as Le Nain and Chardin. Courbet exhibited it in the Salon of 1849, where it won a medal and was purchased by the state.

One of the first major paintings by Pierre-Auguste Renoir, Mother Anthony's Tavern (1866), would pay homage to this work, showing the influence of Courbet on the early Renoir.

== Content ==
This painting continues Courbet's tradition of painting "only what the eye can see," inspired by Dutch masters, yet pushes the idea even further.

Several figures are gathered languidly around a dinner table. At the table, remnants of the meal are still visible, suggesting a recently concluded meal, alongside the title. One figure in the background is leaning, hand on cheek, lost in thought. Another is either thinking, deeply relaxed, or falling asleep. In the central of the painting sits a man with his back to the viewer, playing the flute and facing another man playing the violin. A dog sleeps beneath the chair of one of the musicians, adding a layer of domesticity and familiarity.

Formally, the work is influenced by photography and the impressionist movement, with a single fleeting moment captured. Courbet uses chiaroscuro to guide the eye across the painting. The stark contrasts between light and dark also emphasize the central figure and create a sense of space.

The scene depicted is casual, set in Courbet's hometown, and featuring his friends and family. Some think the man with the glass is his father, his friend Marlet lights a pipe, and host Cuenot is lost in thought in the background. Some people think Courbet himself is within the painting, and these figures are unknown.
