= Equality Before Death =

1848 oil-on-canvas painting by William-Adolphe Bouguereau

- Égalité devant la mort (French)
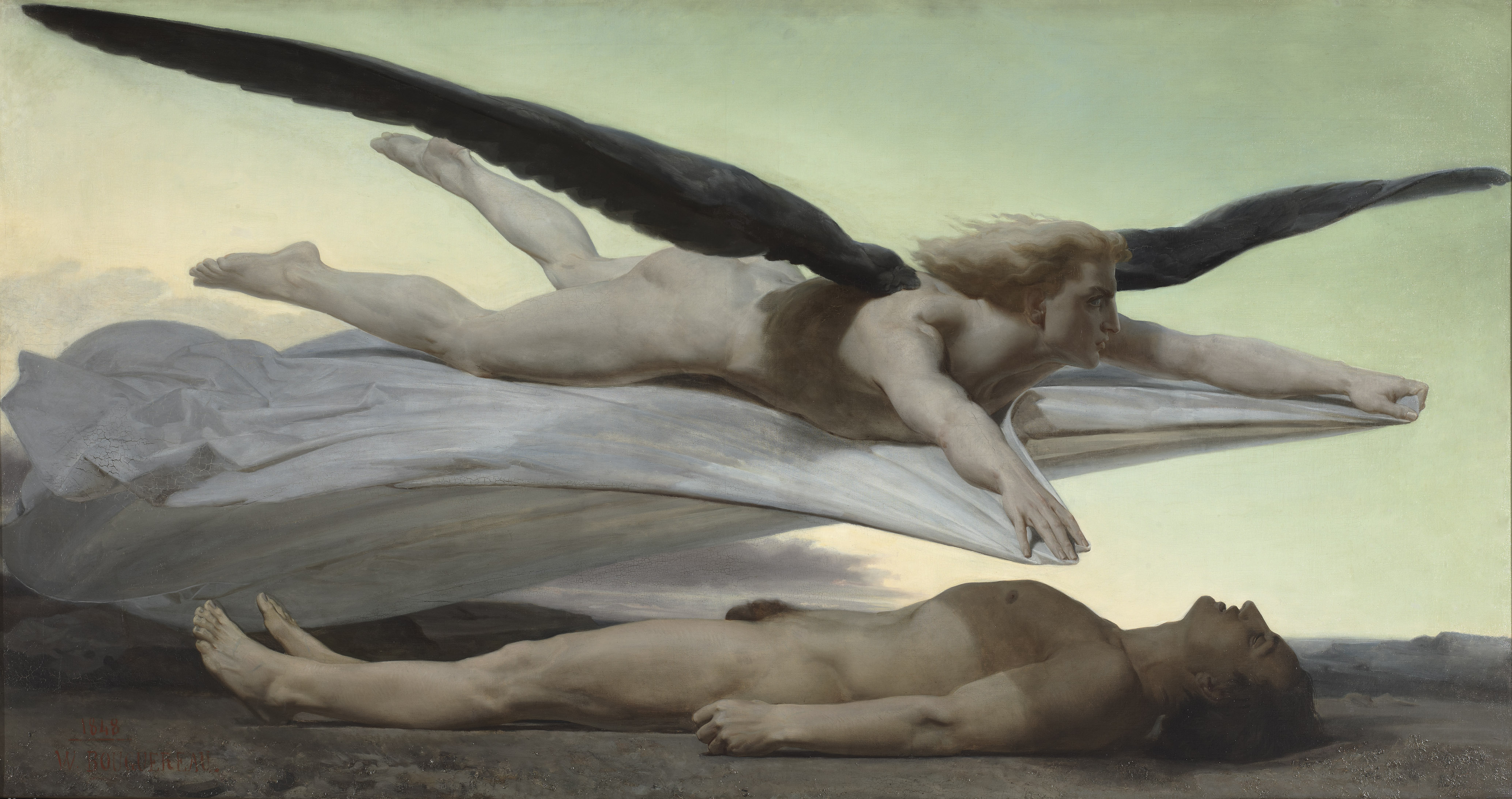
- Artist: William-Adolphe Bouguereau
- Year: 1848
- Medium: Oil on canvas
- Dimensions: 141 cm × 269 cm (56 in × 106 in)
- Location: Musée d'Orsay, Paris

Equality Before Death is an 1848 oil-on-canvas painting by the French academic painter William-Adolphe Bouguereau. It depicts an angel of death covering the body of a young man with a shroud. It is located at the Musée d'Orsay in Paris.

Equality is Bouguereau's first major painting, produced at the age of 23 after two years at the École des Beaux-Arts de Paris. Bouguereau made his debut at the Salon of 1849 with the painting.
