= La Mare au Diable =

Novel by George Sand

La Mare au Diable (The Devil's Pool) is an 1846 novel by George Sand.

== Background ==
The novel is first in a series of four pastoral novels by Sand, based on her childhood; it was followed by François le Champi (1847–1848), La Petite Fadette (1849), and Les Beaux Messieurs de Bois-Doré (1857).

== Plot ==
The Père Maurice is talking to Germain, his 28-year-old young son-in-law, about Germain taking a new wife. Germain has been a widower for two years, and his wife left behind three young children. (Père means Father and is used in ancient oral Language.) Maurice wants Germain to go visit his friend, Père Leonard, at a farm about half a day's ride away, to visit Leonard's daughter, a rich widow who is looking to remarry. Her name is Catherine Guerin and it appears she is a good person. Germain does not really want to remarry, but Maurice tells him that two years is long enough to be in mourning, that he is grateful for Germain having been good to his daughter, and that the children need a mother. He and his wife cannot continue to take care of the three young children, and his son and daughter-in-law are expecting a baby, so will not be able to help. Germain finally agrees. Maurice tells Germain to take a present of game to Leonard and the widow and to leave Saturday, spend the night at the widow's farm, and come back on Sunday.

He leaves with his son, Pierre, and Mary, a young and beautiful 16 year old girl who needs to find a job in town. They stop near the Mare au Diable and spend the night. Germain and Mary begin to fall in love with each other, but neither shows it. The next morning Germain goes to see the widow and leaves his son with Mary. When he comes to fetch him, disappointed by the widow, he learns that Mary has fled her employer (who tried to rape her) with Pierre. Germain finds them both at the Mare au Diable and they all go back to the village. After several months, Germain's mother-in-law persuades him to renew his suit, and Mary accepts.

== Reception and legacy ==
The novel (specifically, its opening scene) is supposed to have been the inspiration for Rosa Bonheur's 1849 painting Ploughing in the Nivernais.

== Criticism ==
A contrasexual reading of the novel was offered by James Hamilton, who suggested that, rather than see Germain as a projection of a male author, Marie could profitably be regarded as an ego-heroine; according to Hamilton, such a reading offers a better explanation of the title (and its explicit reference to a female element, water) and greater depth for Marie's two suitors.

== Translations ==
The novel has been translated into English seven times between 1847 and 2005, more than any other Sand novel.
