= The Coronation of Inês de Castro in 1361 =

1849 painting by Pierre-Charles Comte

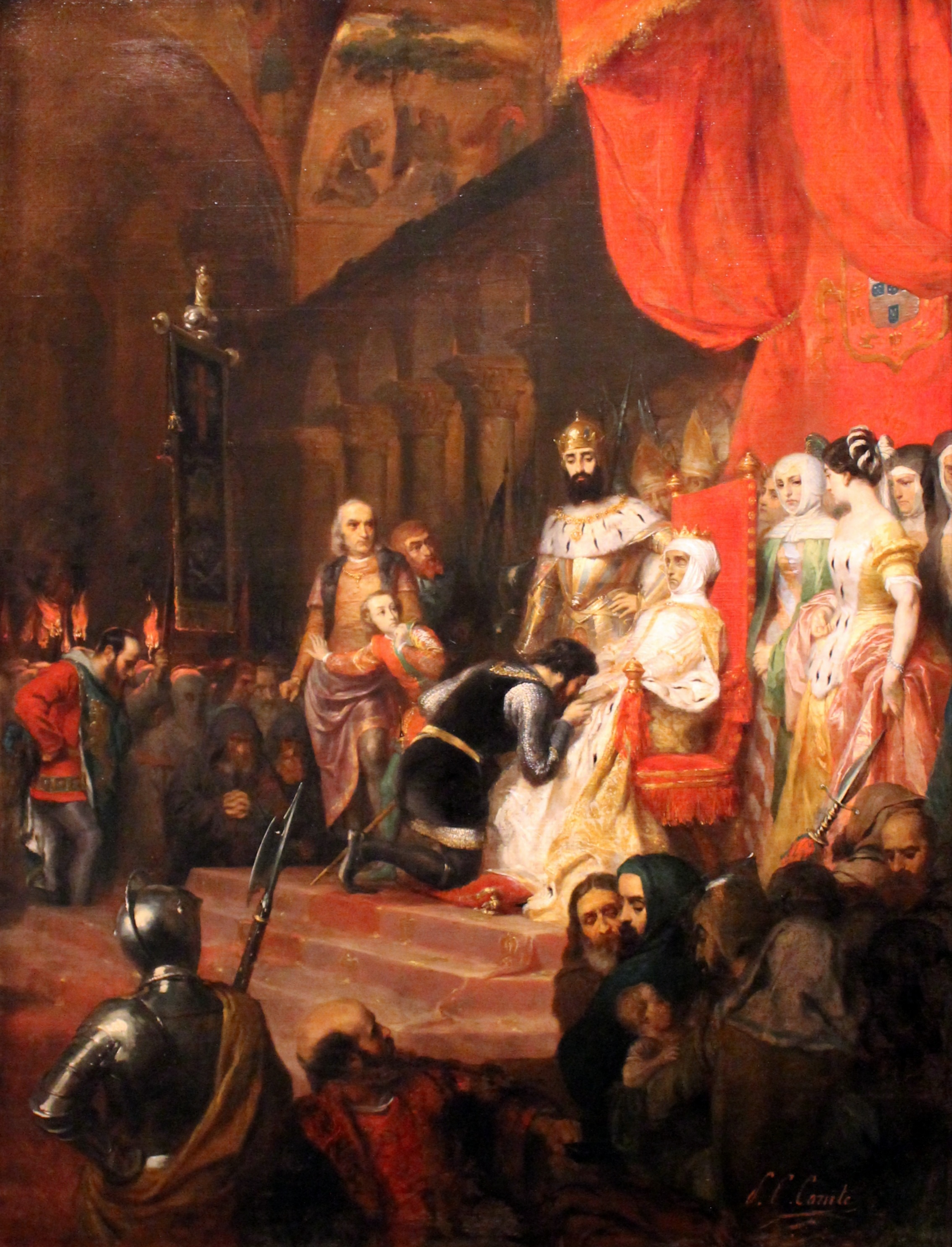
The Coronation of Inês de Castro in 1361 (c. 1849) by Pierre-Charles Comte

The Coronation of Inês de Castro in 1361 is a c. 1849 oil on canvas history painting by the French artist Pierre-Charles Comte, first exhibited at the Paris Salon of 1849 (his second-ever work exhibited at a Salon) and in the Museum of Fine Arts of Lyon since 1885.

Other painters of the time had also painted works on the life of Inês de Castro - count Auguste de Forbin in 1812 (he also exhibited an autograph copy at the 1819 Salon), Gillot Saint-Evre in 1827, Eugénie Servières's Inês de Castro throwing herself and her children at the feet of Afonso IV of Portugal to free dom Pedro, her husband (exhibited at the 1824 Salon) and August Marquet painted Inês de Castro Before Her Murder (1839).

== History of the work ==
The Coronation of Inês de Castro is an early work by Pierre-Charles Comte, produced for his second participation in a Salon. The subject, medieval and macabre, is not new: it had interested romantic authors such as Victor Hugo, Balanche who had made a short story of it in 1811, Persiani who had staged it as a play in 1839.
