= Pierre-Charles Comte =

French painter (1823–1895)

Pierre-Charles Comte (23 April 1823 – 30 November 1895) was a French painter. He was born in Lyon and died in Fontainebleau. His works include The Oath of Henri de Guise and The Coronation of Inês de Castro in 1361.

Comte was a pupil of Claude Bonnefond at the École nationale supérieure des beaux-arts de Lyon between 1840 and 1842. He then moved to Paris to enter the studio of Joseph-Nicolas Robert-Fleury.

He exhibited at the Salon in Paris between 1848 and 1887, and in Lyon. He obtained a 3rd class medal at the Salon of 1852, a 2nd class medal at those of 1853 and 1855 and a recall in 1857. He received a 3rd class medal at the Universal Exhibition of 1867. He then settled in Fontainebleau.

He first practiced history painting, in particular dedicated to the history of the Valois, and genre painting. From 1875, he changed his style by adopting a more "modern" technique. He also made many sculptures in his final years.

His grave rests in the cemetery of Fontainebleau.

== Gallery ==
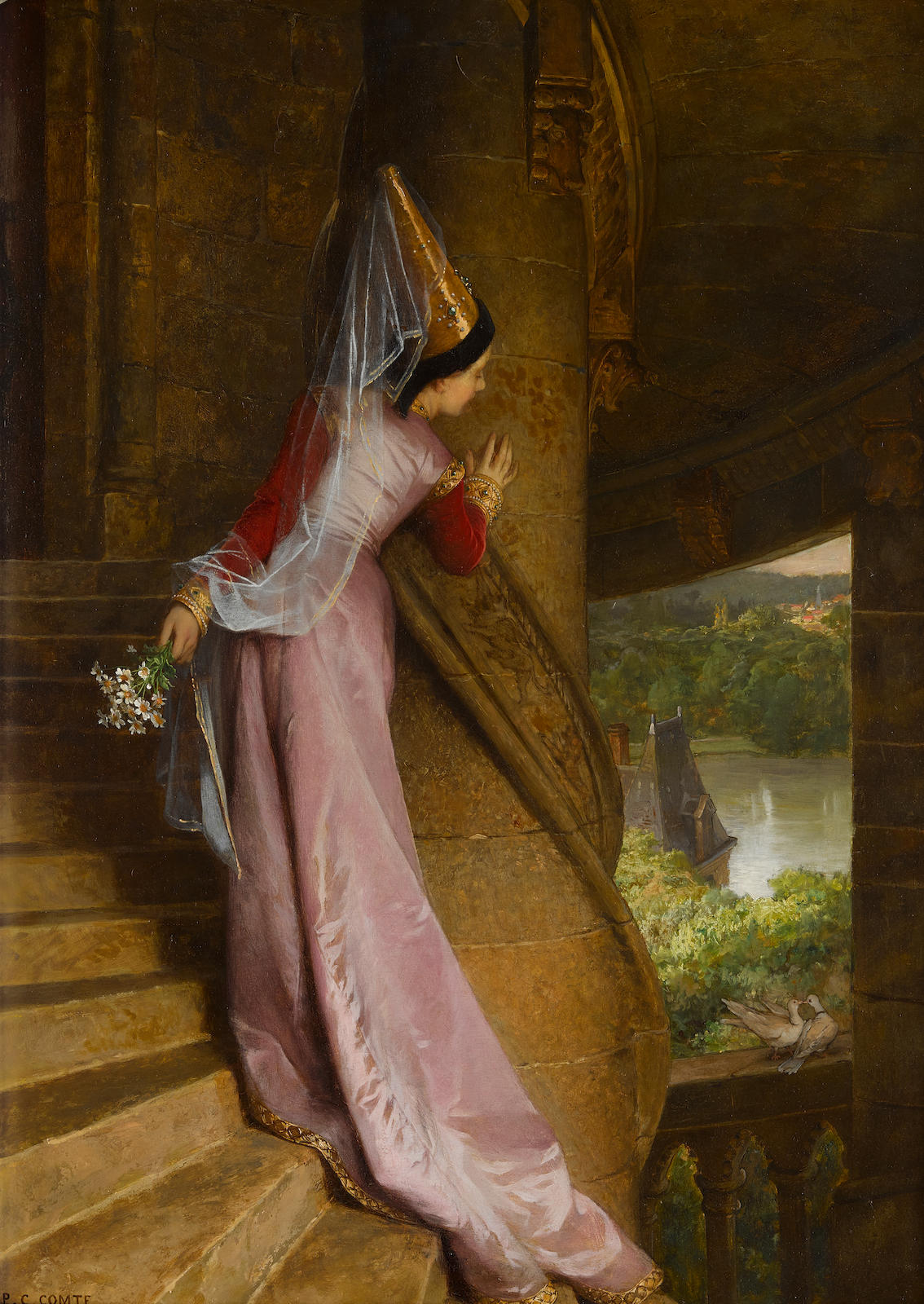
The Secret Rendezvous

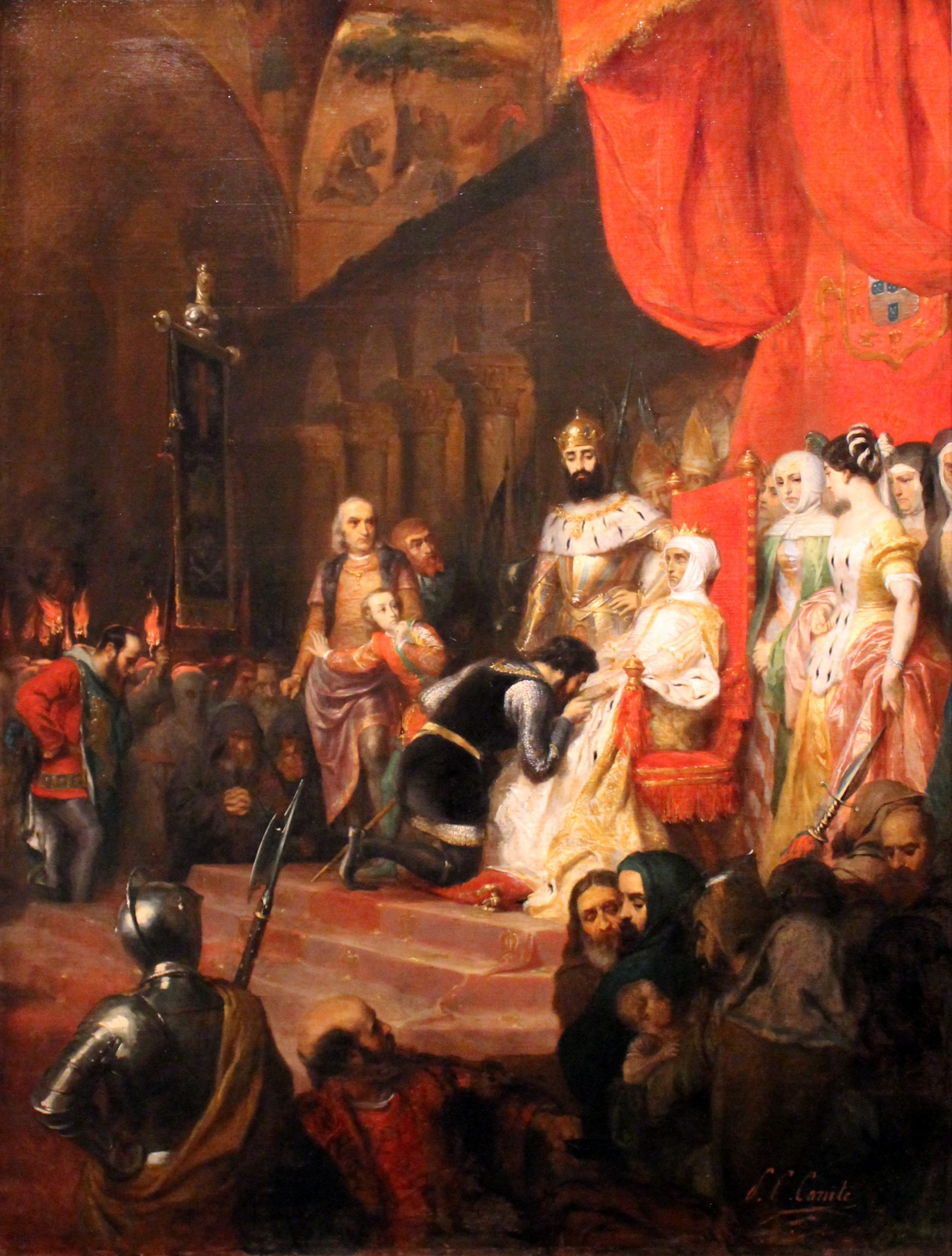
The Coronation of Inês de Castro in 1361, 1849

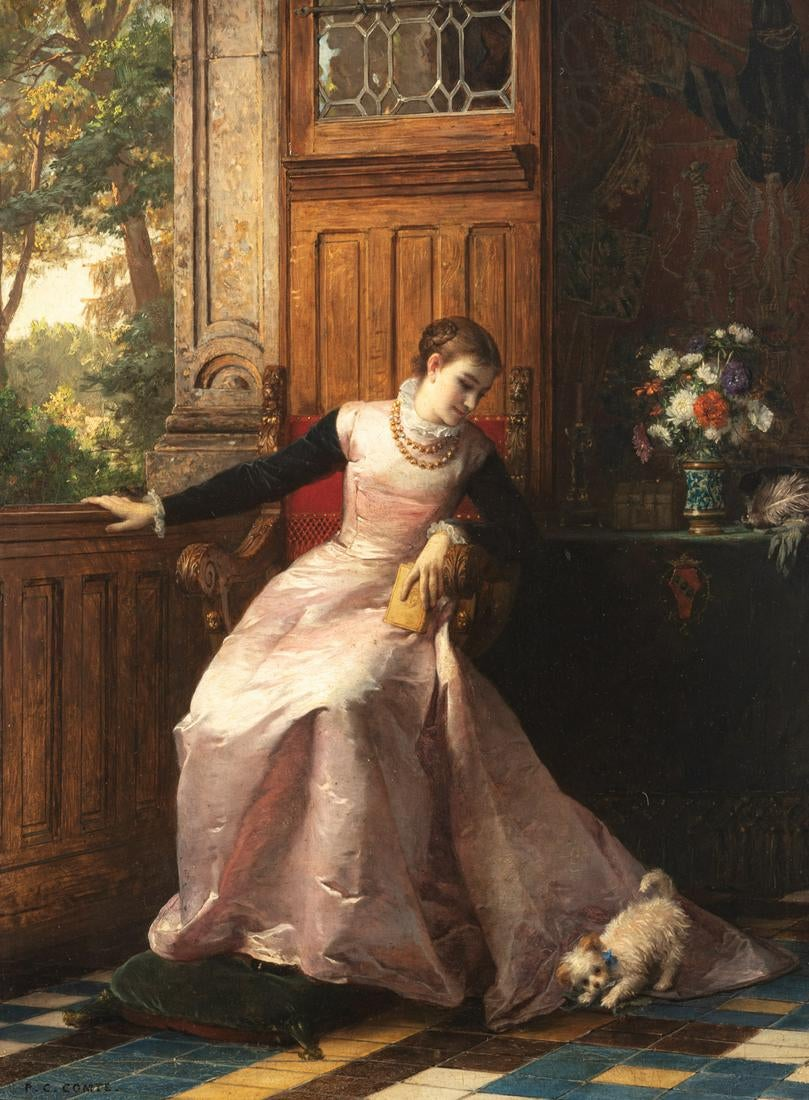
Interrupted Reading

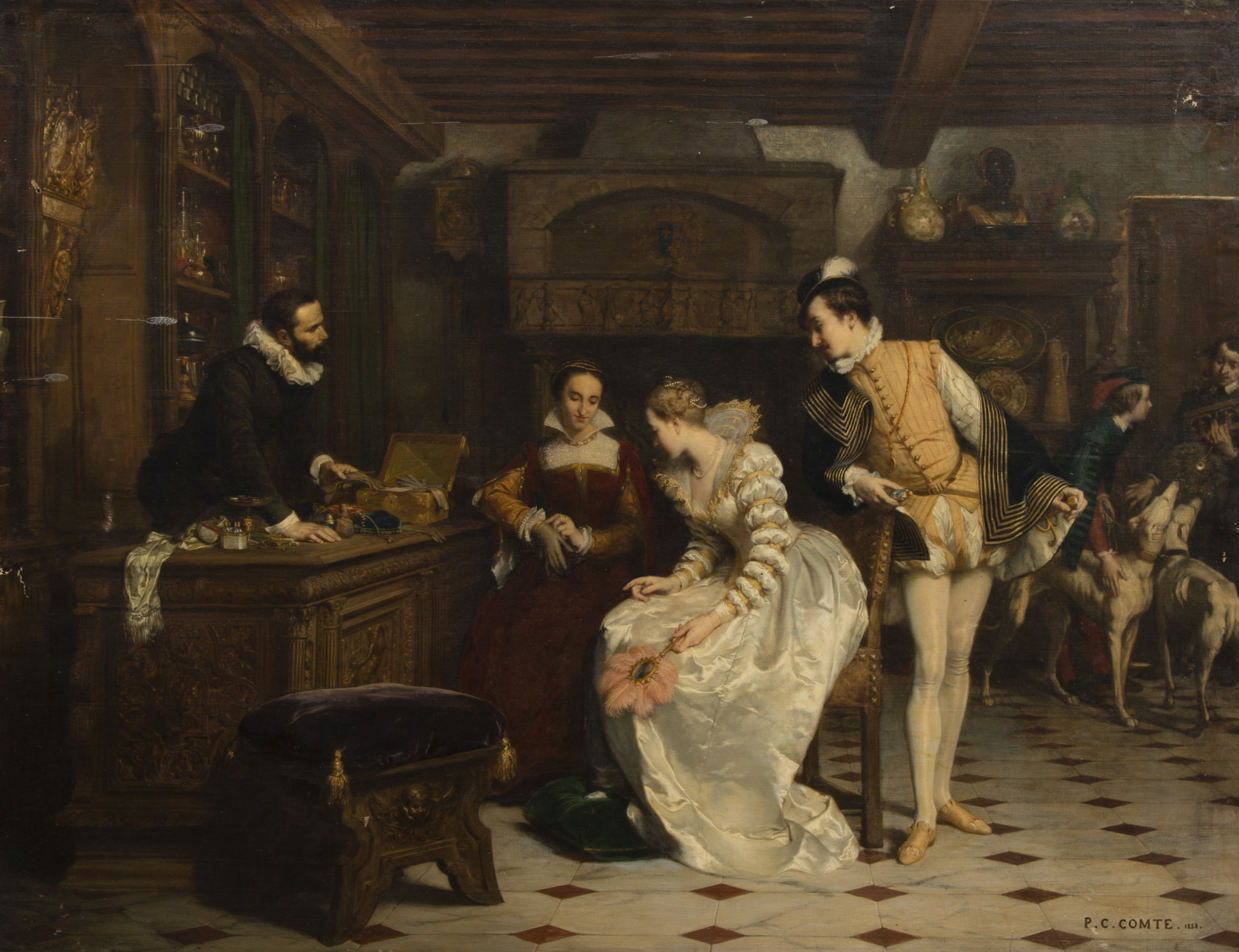
Jeanne III of Navarre buying poisoned gloves from Catherine de' Medici's Parfumeur, René

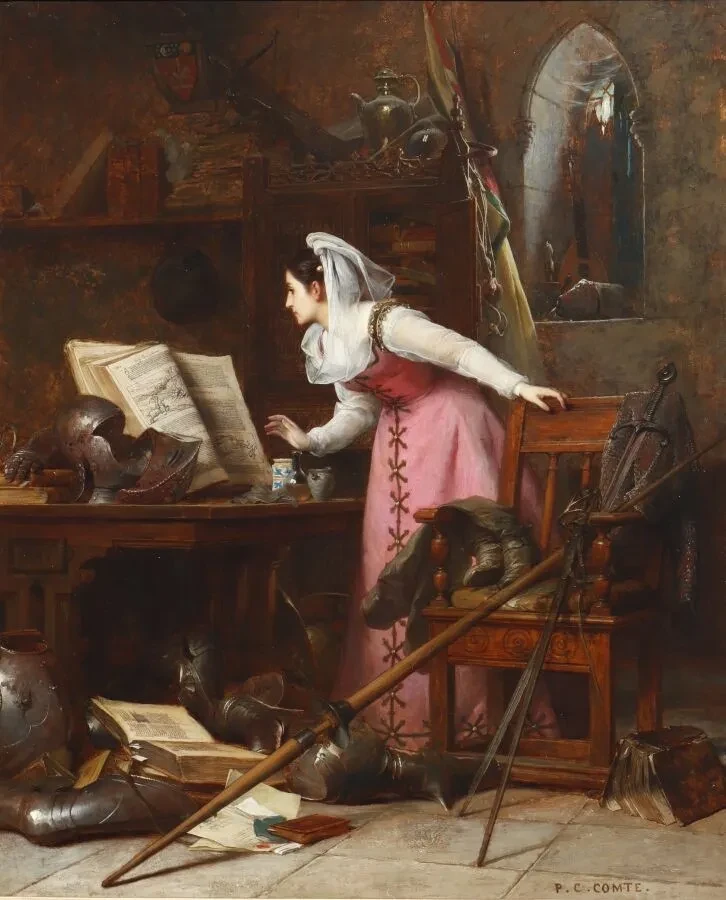
The curious woman in the alchemist knight's study

== Sources ==
- "COMTE, Pierre-Charles (1823 - 1895), Painter : Benezit Dictionary of Artists - oi". oxfordindex.oup.com. Archived from the original on 2016-08-16.
