= Mary Blume =

American historian and biographer

Mary Blume (born in New York City, New York) is an American historian and biographer, who was a newspaper correspondent in Paris for several years.

== Bibliography ==
- After the War was Over: Photographs (with Werner Bischof, 1985)
- Cote D'Azur: Inventing the French Riviera (1992)
- A French Affair: The Paris Beat, 1965-1998 99)
- Master of Us All, The: Balenciaga, His Workrooms, His World (2013)
