= Marie Cazin =

French painter (1844–1924)

- Born: Marie Clarisse Marguerite Guillet; September 19, 1844; Paimboeuf, France
- Died: March 18, 1924 (aged 79); Equihen, France
- Known for: Painting, Sculpture
- Movement: Impressionism
- Spouse: Jean-Charles Cazin (m. 1868)

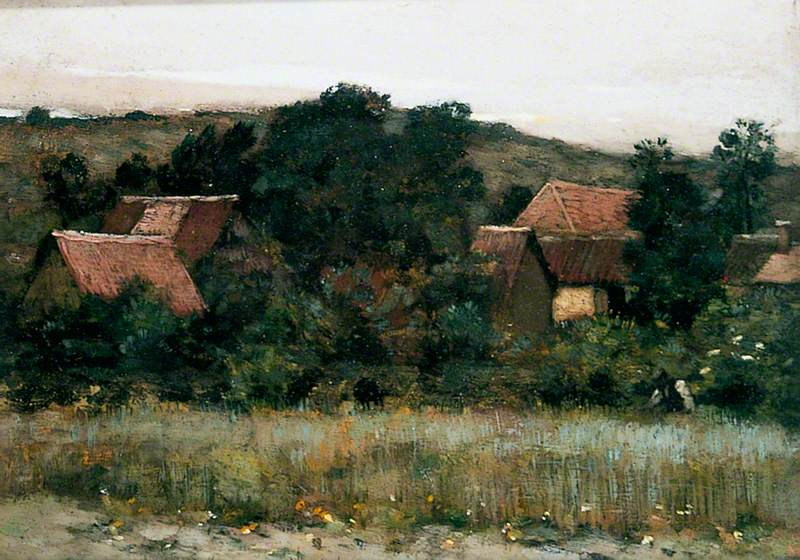
Village Among the Trees

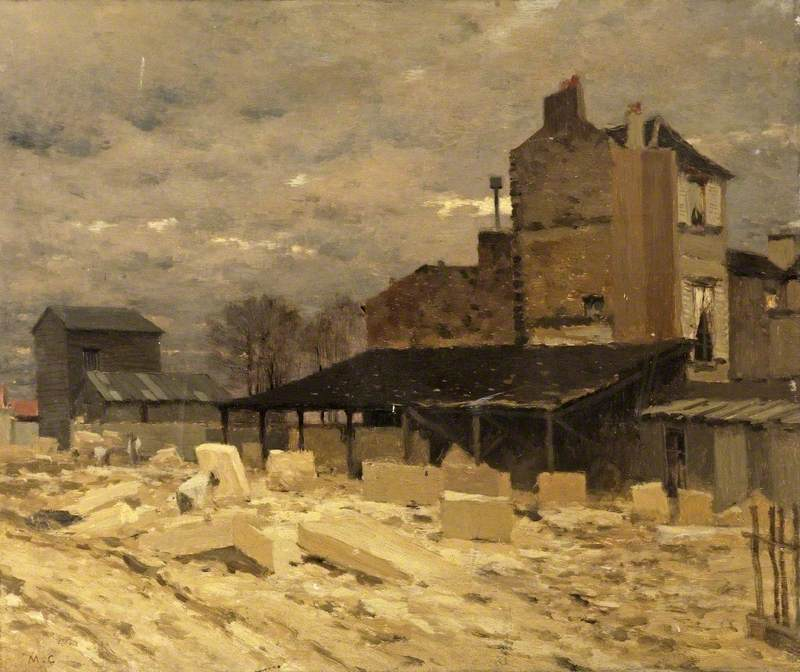
Stone Yard

Marie Cazin, née Marie Clarisse Marguerite Guillet (19 September 1844 in Paimbœuf – 18 March 1924 in Équihen-Plage) was a French landscape painter, decorative artist and sculptor.

== Biography ==
She studied in Paris with Juliette Peyrol-Bonheur (1830–1891), the sister of Rosa Bonheur, and with Jean-Charles Cazin, whom she married in 1868. Beginning in 1876, she exhibited paintings at the Salon des Artistes Français and, from 1882, presented sculptures as well. She also exhibited at the Royal Academy of Arts in 1874 and 1878.

Her best-known sculpture, "The Young Ladies" was shown in 1886 and purchased by the government in 1899. It is now on display at the Musée du Luxembourg. She exhibited with Les XX in Brussels in 1887 and won a gold medal at the Exposition Universelle (1889).

In 1891, she became a member of the Société Nationale des Beaux-Arts. Cazin exhibited her work at the Palace of Fine Arts at the 1893 World's Columbian Exposition in Chicago, Illinois. Following her husband's death, she designed the monument for his tomb. She also designed a monument to doctors Hubert Cazin (1724-1795) and Paul Perrochaud in Berck.

A prominent theme in her paintings are women at work. During the First World War, she maintained a studio in the Latin Quarter. In addition to her regular work, she created several frescoes on commission and did designs for the Gobelins Manufactory. A few years before her death, she retired to Pas-de-Calais.

Her son, Michel Cazin (1869–1917), became a well-known engraver.

Cazin was included in the 2018 exhibit Women in Paris 1850-1900.
