= Isidore Bonheur =

French painter

Isidore Jules Bonheur
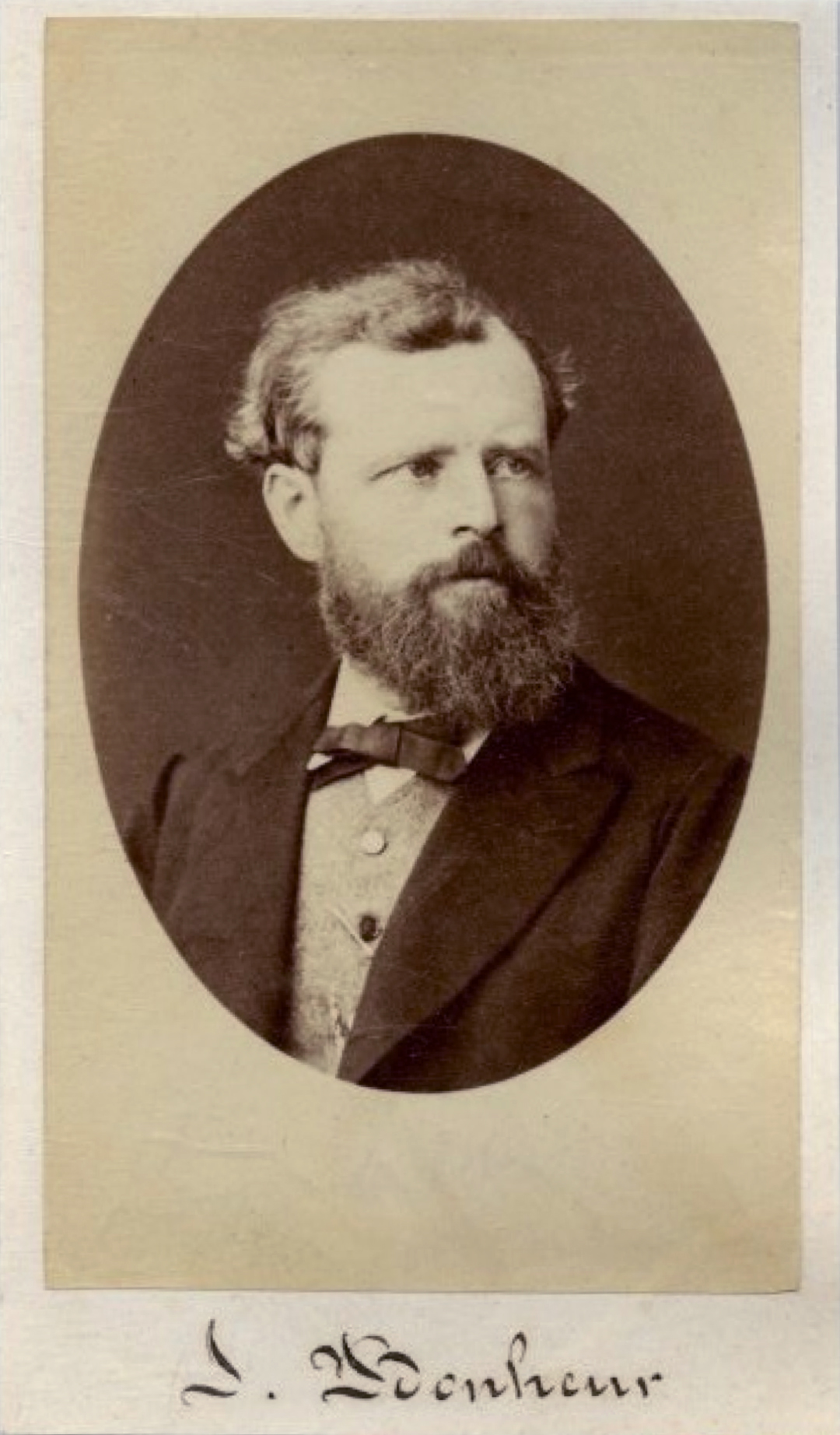
- The artist circa 1870
- Born: Isidore Jules Bonheur; 15 May 1827; Bordeaux
- Died: 10 November 1901 (aged 74); Paris
- Known for: Sculpture; Painting
- Movement: Animalier, Naturalism and Realism
- Father: Oscar-Raymond Bonheur
- Relatives: Rosa Bonheur (sister); Auguste Bonheur (brother)
- Awards: Gold medal Exposition Universelle (1889)

Isidore Jules Bonheur (French: [izidɔʁ bɔnœʁ]; 15 May 1827 – 10 November 1901), best known as one of the 19th century's most distinguished French animalier sculptors. Bonheur began his career as an artist working with his elder sister Rosa Bonheur in the studio of their father, drawing instructor Raymond Bonheur. Initially working as a painter, Isidore Jules Bonheur made his Salon debut in 1848.

== Life ==
Born in Bordeaux, Jules was the third child of Christine Dorotheé Sophie Marquis (1797–1833), a musician, and Oscar-Raymond Bonheur (1796–1849) (a landscape and portrait painter and an early adherent of Saint-Simonianism, a Christian-socialist sect that promoted the education of women alongside men). Jules was the brother of Auguste Bonheur and Rosa Bonheur (1822–1899). "It is I who first gave modeling and sculpture lessons to my brother Isidore" (Rosa Bonheur)

Cavalier arabe enlevant deux lionceaux, c.1875, bronze, Musée d'Orsay, Paris, France

In Bordeaux his father had been friends with Francisco Goya who was living there in exile. In 1828 Bonheur moved to Paris with his mother and brothers and sister, his father having gone ahead of them to establish a residence and income.

He studied painting at first, enrolling in 1849 at the École nationale supérieure des Beaux-Arts, though he made his debut at the Salon (Paris) in 1848 (a Cavalier nègre attaqué par une lionne, plaster, and a drawing of the same subject) and exhibited regularly until 1899. He won medals in 1859, 1865, 1869, took part in the Exposition Universelle (1855), exhibited in London at the Royal Academy of Arts in the 1870s, where he gained great success with equine figures and groups, and won the coveted Médaille d'Or (gold medal) with a sculpture entitled Cavalier Louis XV at the Exposition Universelle (1889). He won a silver medal at l'Exposition [Historique?] de Madrid in 1892, a gold medal at the Exposition Internationale d'Anvers (1894).

Also in 1894, Bonheur was awarded the status of Knight in the Order of the Immaculate Conception of Vila Viçosa (Cavaleiro da Ordem de Nossa Senhora da Conceição de Vila Viçosa), Portugal. In 1895 he was named Chevalier (Knight) of the Order of Isabella the Catholic, Spain. He was named Chevalier (Knight) of the Legion of Honour on 7 May 1895, decorated 24 May, and breveted 18 September 1895, Paris.

Isidore Bonheur, Taureau

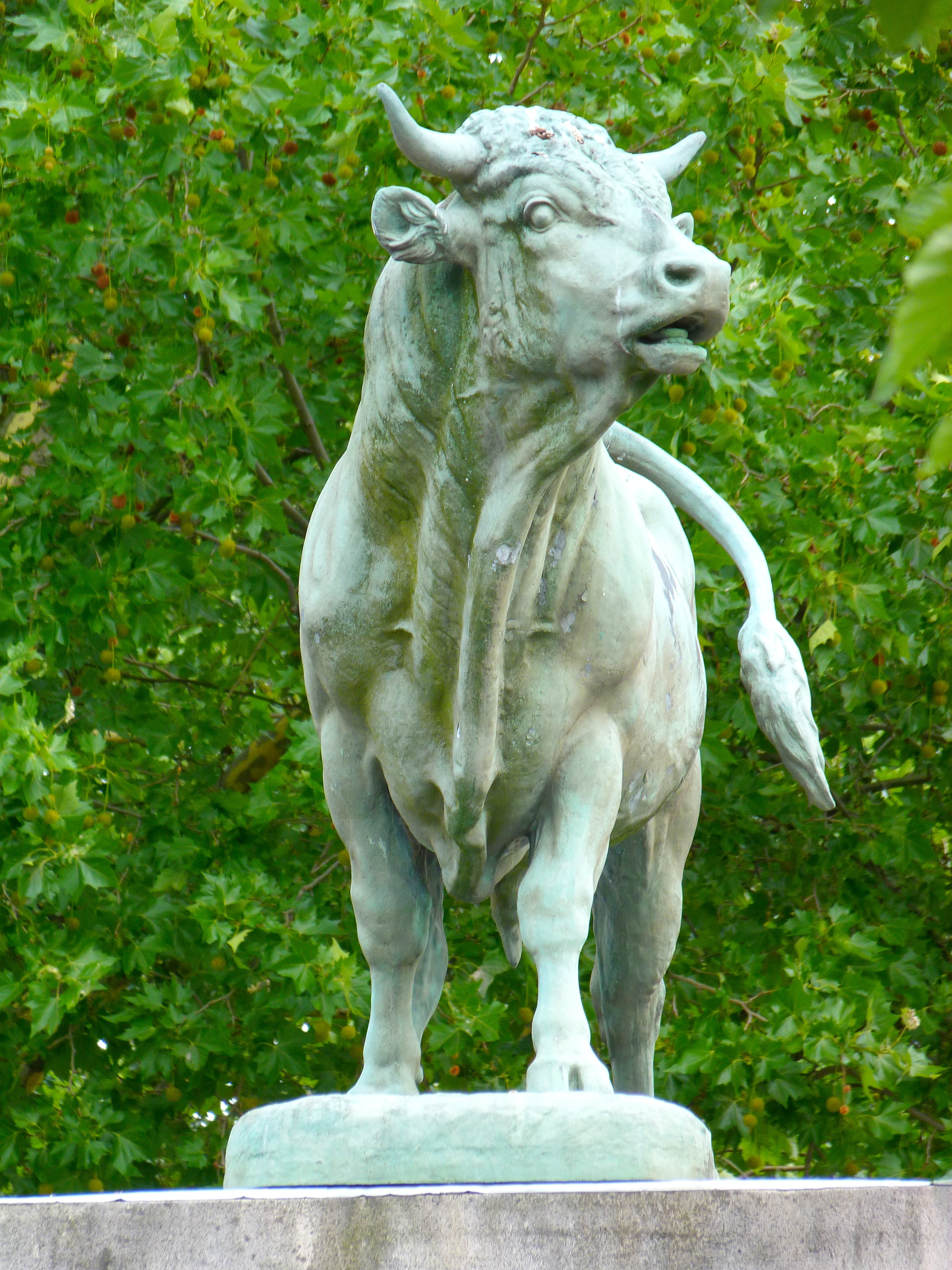
Sculpture on the left at the entrance of the Parc Georges Brassens, Paris 15th arrond., cast iron, foundry Val d'Osne 1878

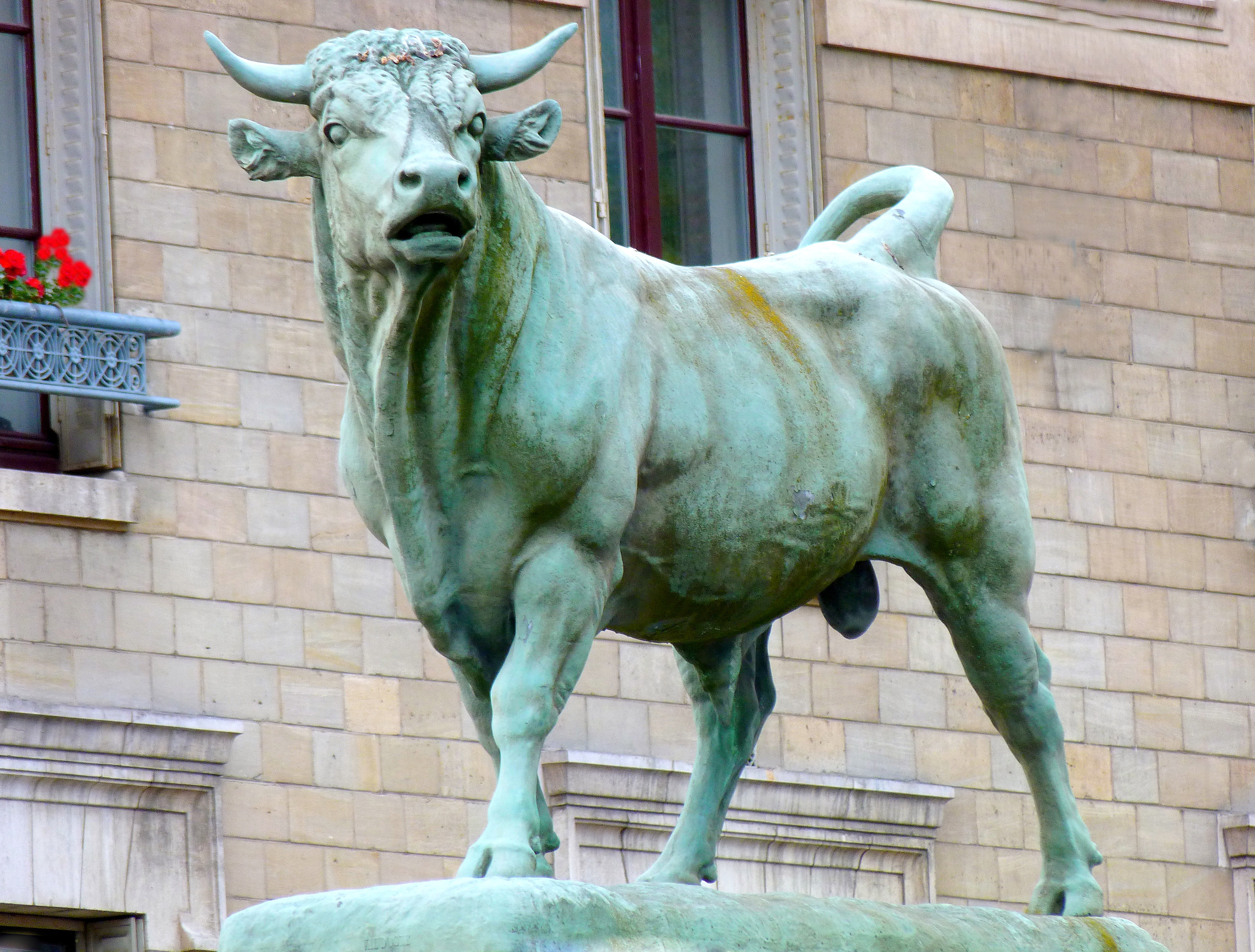
Sculpture on the right at the entrance of the Parc Georges Brassens, Paris 15th arrond., cast iron, foundry Val d'Osne 1878

He had given up painting in favor of sculpture early on in his career, though he was noted primarily for his small animalier groups. His studio (atelier) was located at l'Impasse du Moulin Joly, on the corner of rue du Faubourg-du-Temple in Paris.

Isidore Bonheur found a greater market for his work in the mid-nineteenth century in England versus France. In 1870 he gained representation at the Royal Academy and produced a variety of work that catered to English collectors.

Many of his bronzes were edited by the founder Hippolyte Peyrol, Bonheur's brother-in-law by marriage to Juliette Bonheur (Isidor's youngest sister). The Peyrol casts for both Rosa and Isidore Bonheur are exceptionally well executed, which suggests a strong working relationship between the founder and sculptor. There is little doubt that Isidore Bonheur was an acute observer of nature; his animals were not anthropomorphized, but modelled to catch movement or posture characteristic of the particular species. He achieved this most successfully with his sculptures of horses, which are usually depicted as relaxed rather than spirited, and which are among his most renowned works.

== Works ==
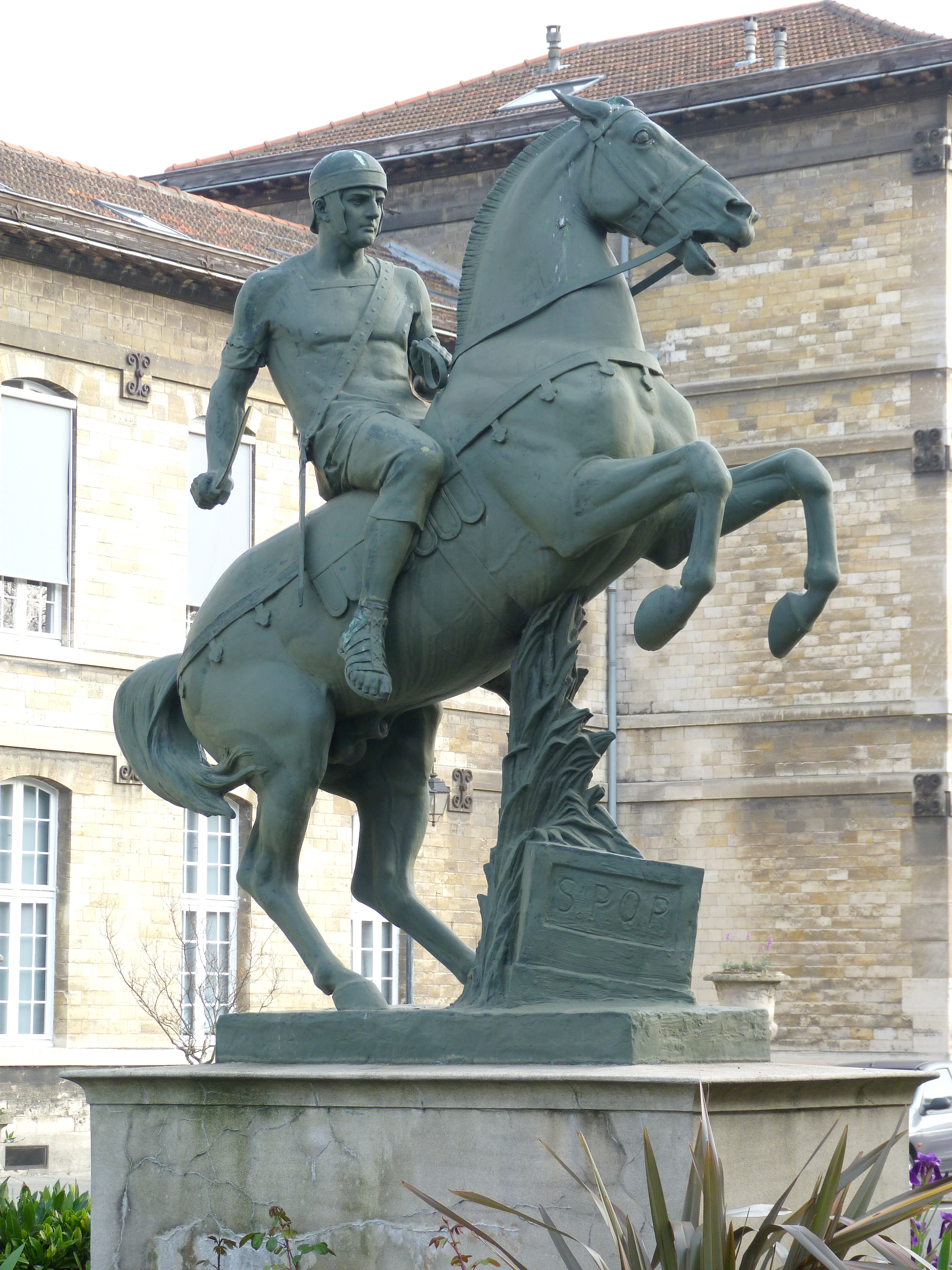
Gladiateur à cheval, hôpital Sainte-Anne, Paris

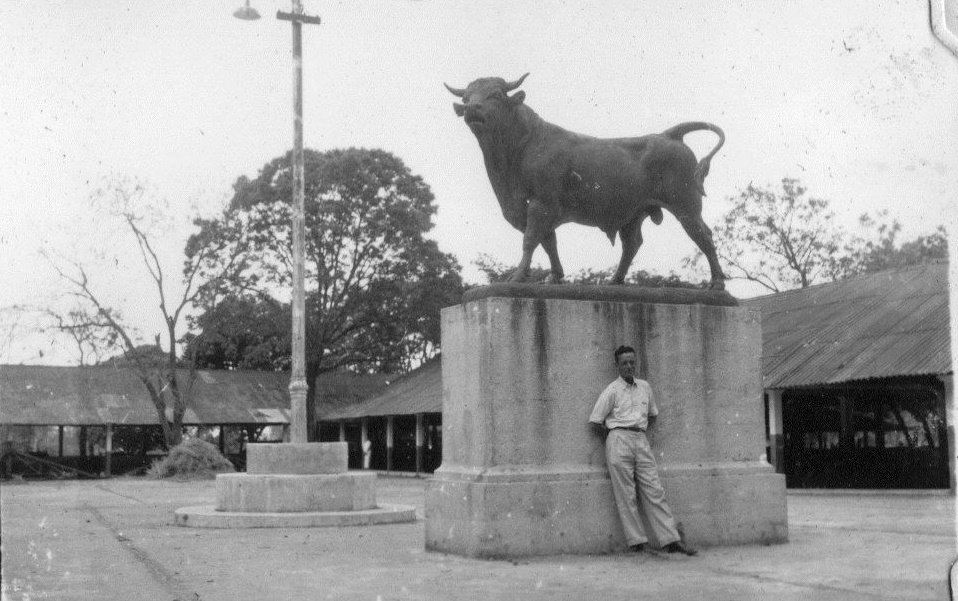
US engineer Parker Dawes in front of the Toro Monument in northern Maracay, 1945

- Combat de Taureaux, bronze, 1850
- Cavalier chassant un taureau, 1852 (Rosa Bonheur: sa vie – son œuvre, list page 164)
- Un zèbre attaqué par une panthère, bronze, 1853, (commissioned by the French Ministère d'État for the Palace of Fontainebleau) Archives nationales, site de Pierrefitte-sur-Seine
- Niche du Bassin de la Cascade; Zébre attaqué par une panthère; Onagre attaqué par un jaguar 1853–1854, bronze, commissioned by the Ministère d'État and placed at the Château de Fontainebleau, where it remains today.
- Hercule et les chevaux de Diomède, 1855
- Vache défendant son veau contre un loup, c.1857, bronze, exhibited 1858, Galerie de la Société des Amis des Arts, 7ème Exposition de la Société des Amis des Arts (n° 48), Bordeaux, Musée des Beaux-Arts, Bordeaux
- Ulysse reconnu par son chien, 1859
- Un Taureau, 1864, İstanbul
- Deux Taureaux, Salon de 1865 sur le site Culture.gouv.fr – On remarque les deux taureaux d'Isidore Bonheur et une réduction du Vercingétorix d'Aimé Millet. Exhibited at l'Exposition Universelle (1878), cast iron, Fonderie du Val d'Osne, now at the entrance of the parc Georges-Brassens, Paris. A life-size replica was made for Juan Vicente Gómez and is located in northern Maracay, Venezuela.
- Gladiateur à cheval, 1866, posthumous cast, 1902, Hôpital Sainte-Anne, Paris
- Deux Lions, 1867, stone, commissioned by the Ministère d'État for the facade of the Palais de Justice, place de Harley
- Pépin-le-Bref dans l'arène, 1873
- Lion vainqueur d'un serpent, 1876
- Le Dénicheur de tigres, 1877
- Un cavalier sous Louis XV, 1879
- Cavalier romain, 1880, bronze, Salon de la Société nationale des Beaux-Arts, 1883 (no. 895), Archives nationales, site de Pierrefitte-sur-Seine
- Cavalier romain, 1880, bronze, Salon de la Société des artistes français, 1882 (no. 4131), Archives nationales, site de Pierrefitte-sur-Seine
- Un cavalier sous Henri II, 1884
- Cerf faisant tête, 1885
- Trompette sous Louis XIII, 1886
- Le Saut de la haie, and Portrait du cheval jongleur, 1889 (exhibited at the Exposition Universelle (1889))
- Cavalier Louis XV, (Gold medal Exposition Universelle (1889))
- Cerf aux écoutes, and Sanglier coiffé par un chien, 1894
- Un Chien, bronze, Musée des Beaux-Arts, Bordeaux
- Chienne, bronze, musée municipal, Saint-Dizier
- Un Lion, bronze, Musée des Beaux-Arts de Nantes
- Une Lionne, bronze, Musée des Beaux-Arts de Nantes
- Deux paysages, oil on canvas, Musée des Beaux-Arts, Bordeaux
- Renard à l'affût, bronze, provenance: Rothschild, Alphonse, baron de, Musée des Beaux-Arts, Bordeaux
- Un taureau, wax, Musée des Beaux-Arts, Bordeaux
- Lion Marchant, bronze, Musée d'Orsay, Paris, now at
- Bétail au pâturage, bronze, Musée d'Art et d'Histoire de Toul
- Cavalier arabe tenant deux lionceaux, bronze, Musée d'Orsay, Paris
- Ours, bronze, Musée d'Orsay, Paris, and Musée des Arts décoratifs, Nantes
- Chasseurs de fauves, bronze, Musée du quai Branly
- Brilliant 1271 (755), bronze, Rahr West Art Museum
