= Jean-Charles Cazin =

French painter

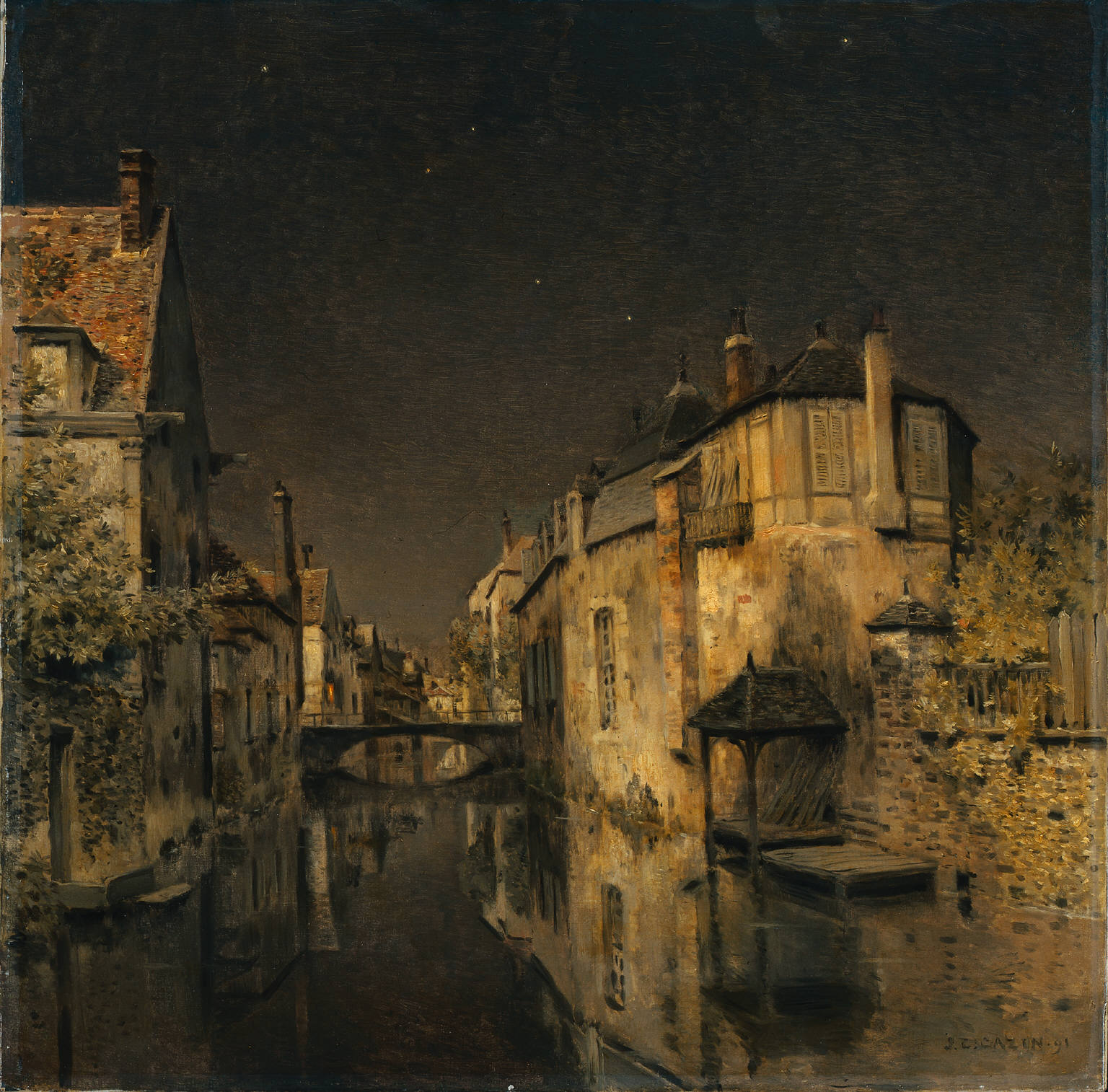
Midnight

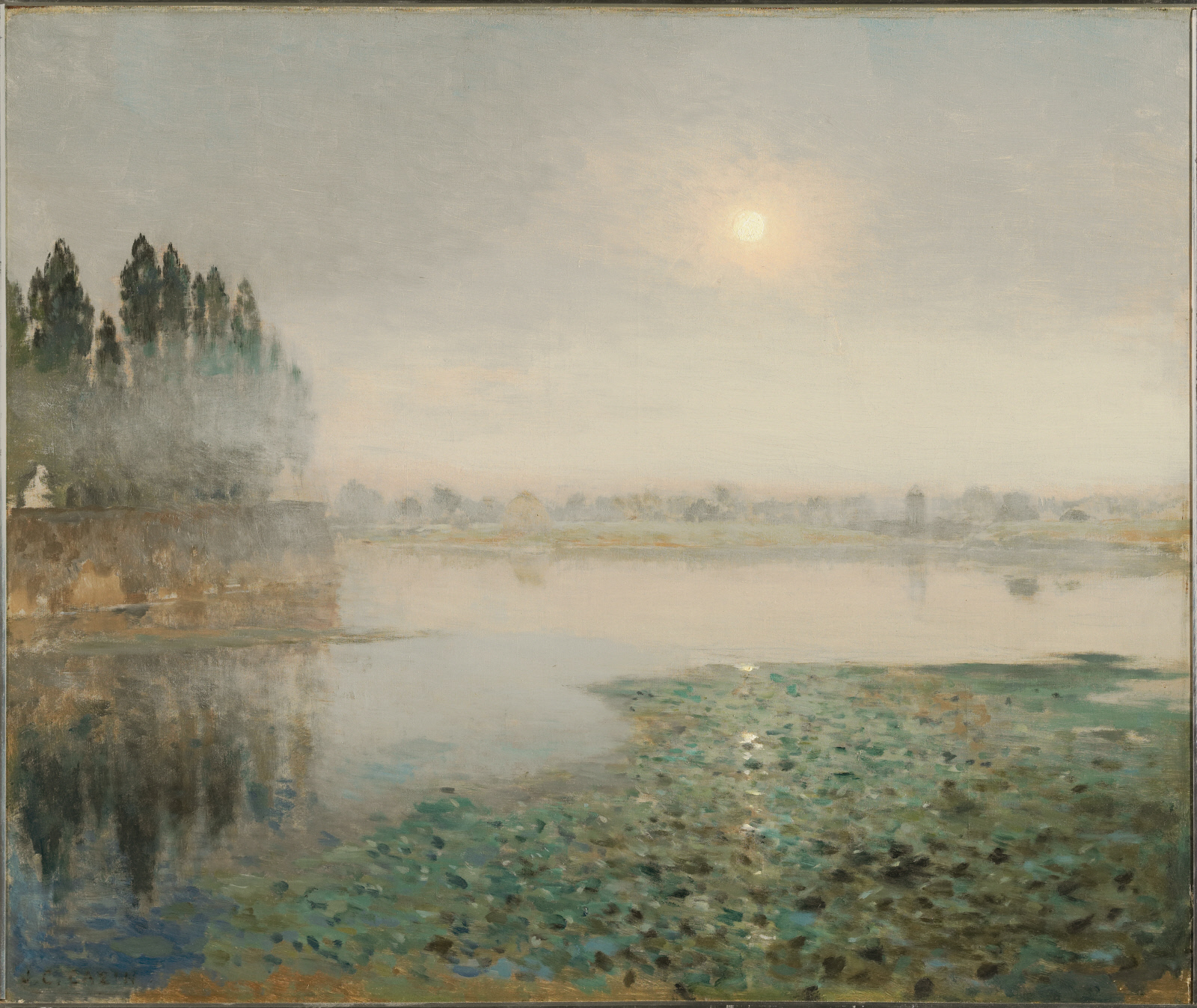
Jean-Charles Cazin, Mist on the River, c. 1889, oil on canvas. Clark Art Institute

Jean-Charles Cazin (25 May 1840 – 17 March 1901) was a French landscapist, museum curator and ceramicist.

== Biography ==
The son of a well-known doctor, FJ Cazin (1788–1864), he was born at Samer, Pas-de-Calais. After studying in France, he went to England, where he was strongly influenced by the pre-Raphaelite movement. His chief earlier pictures have a religious interest, shown in such examples as The Flight into Egypt (1877), or Hagar and Ishmael (1880, Luxembourg); and afterwards his combination of luminous landscape with figure-subjects (Souvenir de fête, 1881; Journée faite, 1888) gave him a wide repute, and made him the leader of a new school of idealistic subject-painting in France.

In 1890, Theodore Child discussed a few of his paintings (including a series of five paintings depicting the story of Judith and Holofernes) in Harper's Magazine. He painted a scene from The Odyssey, Ulysses after the Shipwreck.

He was made an officer of the Legion of Honour in 1889. His charming and poetical treatment of landscape, and especially seascape, is the feature in his tonalism painting which in later years has given them an increasing value among connoisseurs.

His wife, Marie Cazin (1844–1924), who was his pupil and exhibited her first picture at the Salon in 1876, the same year in which Cazin himself made his debut there, was also a well-known artist and sculptor.

In 1885–86 he posed for the figure of Eustache de Saint-Pierre in the bronze group The Burghers of Calais by his friend, Auguste Rodin.

== See also ==
- Bruce Crane

== Bibliography ==
- Yann GOBERT-SERGENT, Jean-Charles Cazin (1841-1901), maître intimiste des dunes et des ciels boulonnais, Cercle Historique Portelois, juin 2018.
- Yann GOBERT-SERGENT, Promenade Intimiste dans les Dunes du Boulonnais – Jean-Charles Cazin (1841-1901), Cahiers du Patrimoine Boulonnais, n° 78, décembre 2018, pp. 26–32.
