= Raymond Bonheur =

French painter

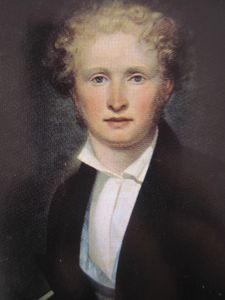
- Self-portrait
- Born: Oscar-Raymond Bonheur; 20 March 1796; Bordeaux, France
- Died: 23 March 1849 (aged 53); Paris, France
- Known for: Painting
- Spouse: Christine Dorotheé Sophie Marquis
- Children: Rosa, Auguste, Isidore, and Juliette

Oscar-Raymond Bonheur (French: [ʁɛmɔ̃ bɔnœʁ]; 1796–1849) was a French painter. He is best known as the father of Rosa Bonheur (1822–1899), Auguste Bonheur (1824–1884), Isidore Bonheur (1827–1901), and Juliette Bonheur (1830–1891).

== Biography ==
Bonheur was born in 1796. He was a landscape and portrait painter. He was also follower of Saint-Simonianism He left his wife, Sophie, and his four children to join a Saint-Simonian community. When Sophie died of tuberculosis, he took over the responsibility for his previously abandoned children. He sent his two sons to boarding school and Juliette was sent to live with a family friend. Rosa remained with her father.

He died in 1849.

== Personal life ==
Bonheur's family was of Jewish descent.
