= Auguste Bonheur =

French painter

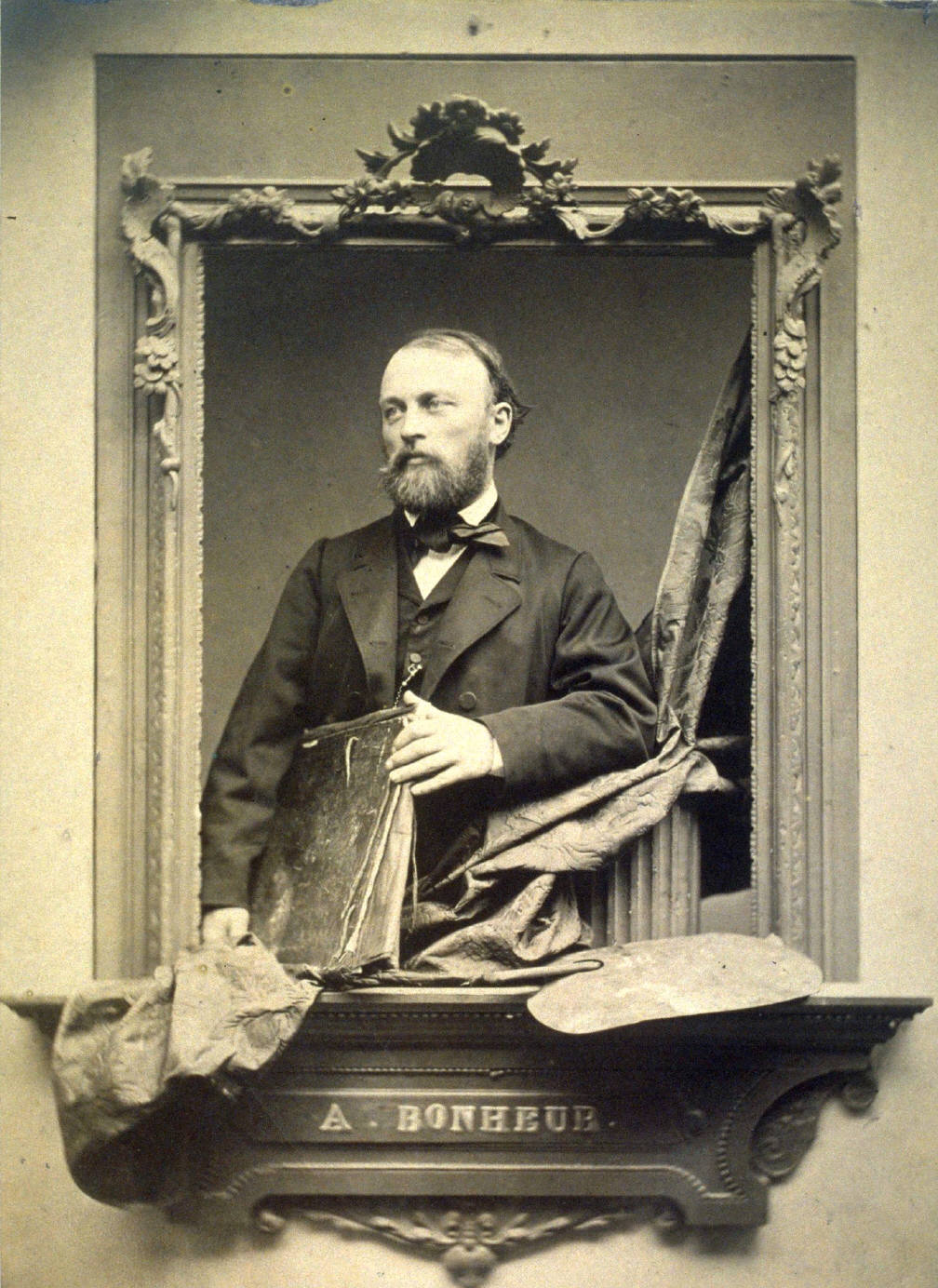
- Portrait of Auguste-François Bonheur by French photographer Adolphe Dallemagne
- Born: 3 November 1824; Bordeaux, France
- Died: 21 February 1884 (aged 59); Paris, France
- Education: National School of Fine Arts in Paris
- Known for: Painting
- Movement: Realism
- Father: Oscar-Raymond Bonheur
- Awards: Knight of the Legion of Honour

Auguste Bonheur (French: [oɡyst bɔnœʁ]; 3 November 1824 in Bordeaux – 21 February 1884 in Bellevue, Seine-et-Oise) was a French painter of animals and bucolic scenes in landscapes. In his compositions he was able to accurately depict the horizon, ambience, luminous settings and space. His works show the influence of the paintings of cattle by seventeenth-century Dutch painters such as Aelbert Cuyp and Paulus Potter.

During his lifetime Bonheur's works were compared to those of his more successful older sister, the renowned animal painter Rosa Bonheur. This is believed to have had a negative effect on his career. Nevertheless, Bonheur's paintings enjoyed popularity among British art collectors. In the Netherlands, the uncle of Vincent van Gogh, an art dealer also called Vincent van Gogh, owned one of his paintings.

== Life ==
Auguste Bonheur was the younger brother of the renowned painter Rosa Bonheur and older brother of the animalier sculptor Isidore Bonheur. Auguste was the first son of the painter Oscar-Raymond Bonheur (1796–1849) and Christine Dorotheé Sophie Marquis (1797–1833). His mother died a year after the birth of her last child. Raymond Bonheur remarried and moved to Paris in 1829. His sister, Juliette Bonheur, born in 1830, also became a painter, and married the artist Auguste François Hippolyte Peyrol in 1852. The Bonheur family lived in Magny-les-Hameaux in the department of Yvelines. Auguste Bonheur was admitted to the École des Beaux-Arts de Paris in 1848 in the studio of Paul Delaroche. Like his sister Rosa, he became a peintre animalier.

Bonheur preferred the traditional and detailed painting style and received his education at his father's atelier. Bonheur exhibited at the Salon of 1845. In 1852 he won a third-class medal for his landscapes Côtes de Brageac (Cantal) and Environs of Mauriac (Cantal), and a first-class medal in 1861. In the 1860s he made a trip to Scotland. His Highland Scene with Cattle in the Victoria and Albert Museum of 1863 depicts the scenery of the Scottish lochs.

Bonheur married and had a son named Raymond, who became a music composer and a close friend of André Gide and confidant of Claude Debussy (Debussy’s Prélude à l'après-midi d'un faune is dedicated to Raymond Bonheur). In 1856 Bonheur's painting Mountain Scenery in the Auvergne: Early Morn was shown in Liverpool as part of an exhibition of French painting, along with other works by Auguste and Rosa. This may be the same painting as The Ruins of the Château d’Apchon, exhibited at the Salon in 1853, and purchased by the French minister of the interior on the advice of Rosa. The minister's painting was bought in 1868 by George Holt of Sudley House under the title Landscape, Auvergne, and is still on display there.

Auguste Bonheur was appointed a Knight of the Legion of Honour in 1867. Bonheur's La Sortie du pâturage, which is 100 by 160 inches (2.5 by 4.1 m) in size, was painted in 1861 and exhibited in the Salon the same year along with his L'Arrivée à la foire, Auvergne (Coming to the Market, Auvergne) and Rencontre de deux troupeaux dans les Pyrénées (Encounter of Two Herds in the Pyrenees). The Sortie was awarded a first-class medal, and as a result was included as a prize in a lottery run by the French government to promote the ownership of modern art. It was won by Leblois, an employee of the Chemins de fer de l'Est. The painting, together with Auguste's Le Combat, souvenir des Pyrénées, later passed into the ownership of Sir Edward Bates at Gyrn Castle in Flintshire.

The poet and art critic Théophile Gautier visited the Salon of 1861 and noted Auguste Bonheur's three paintings. Writing in Abécédaire du Salon de 1861, Gautier noted the similarity of style between Bonheur and Rosa, although Auguste's landscape settings were stronger and purer in colour, giving an impression of luminous sunshine. On balance, Gautier favoured the paintings of Rosa Bonheur for their stronger brushwork.

Auguste Bonheur's paintings

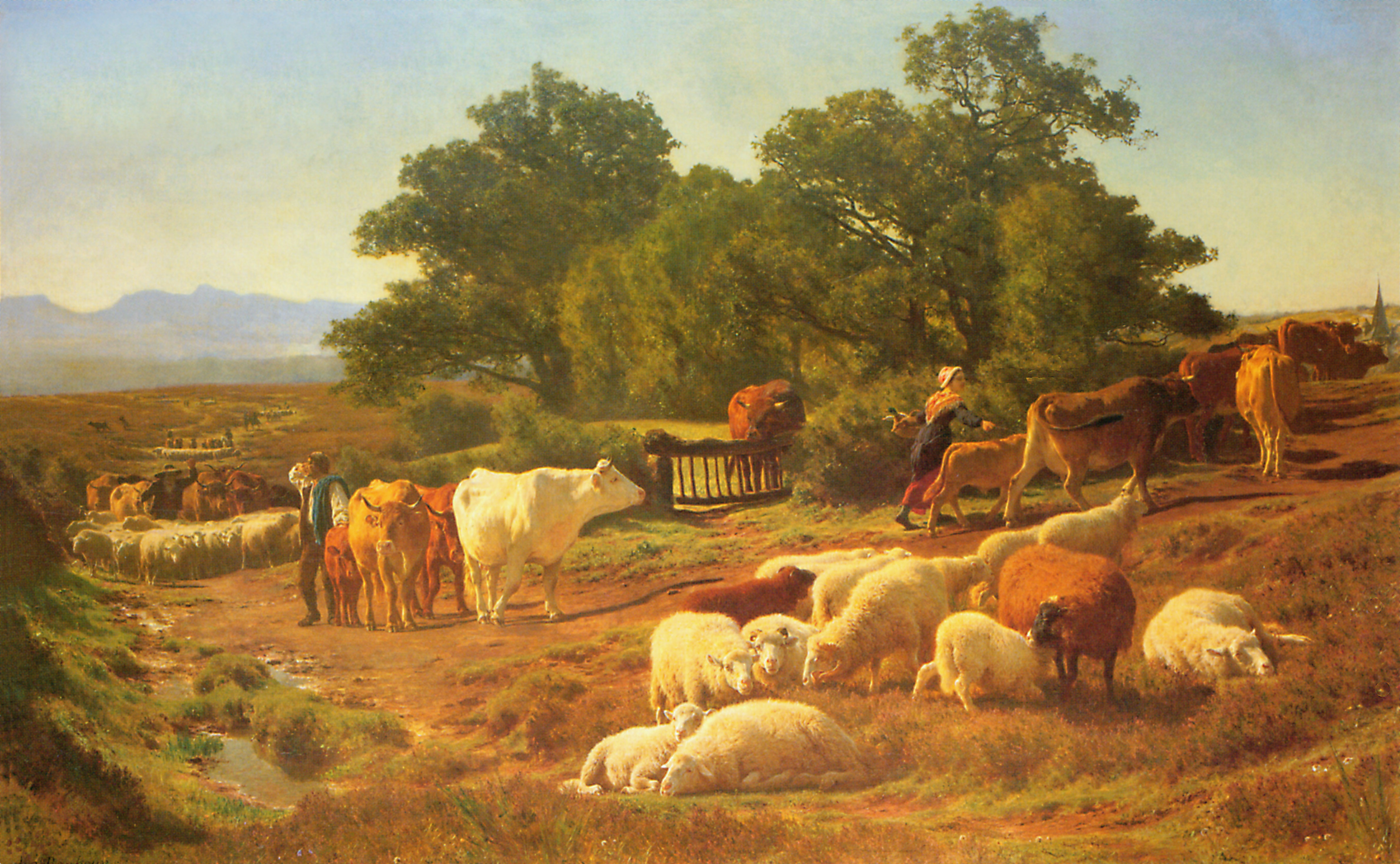
La Sortie du pâturage (The Return from the Pasture), 1861. Oil on canvas.

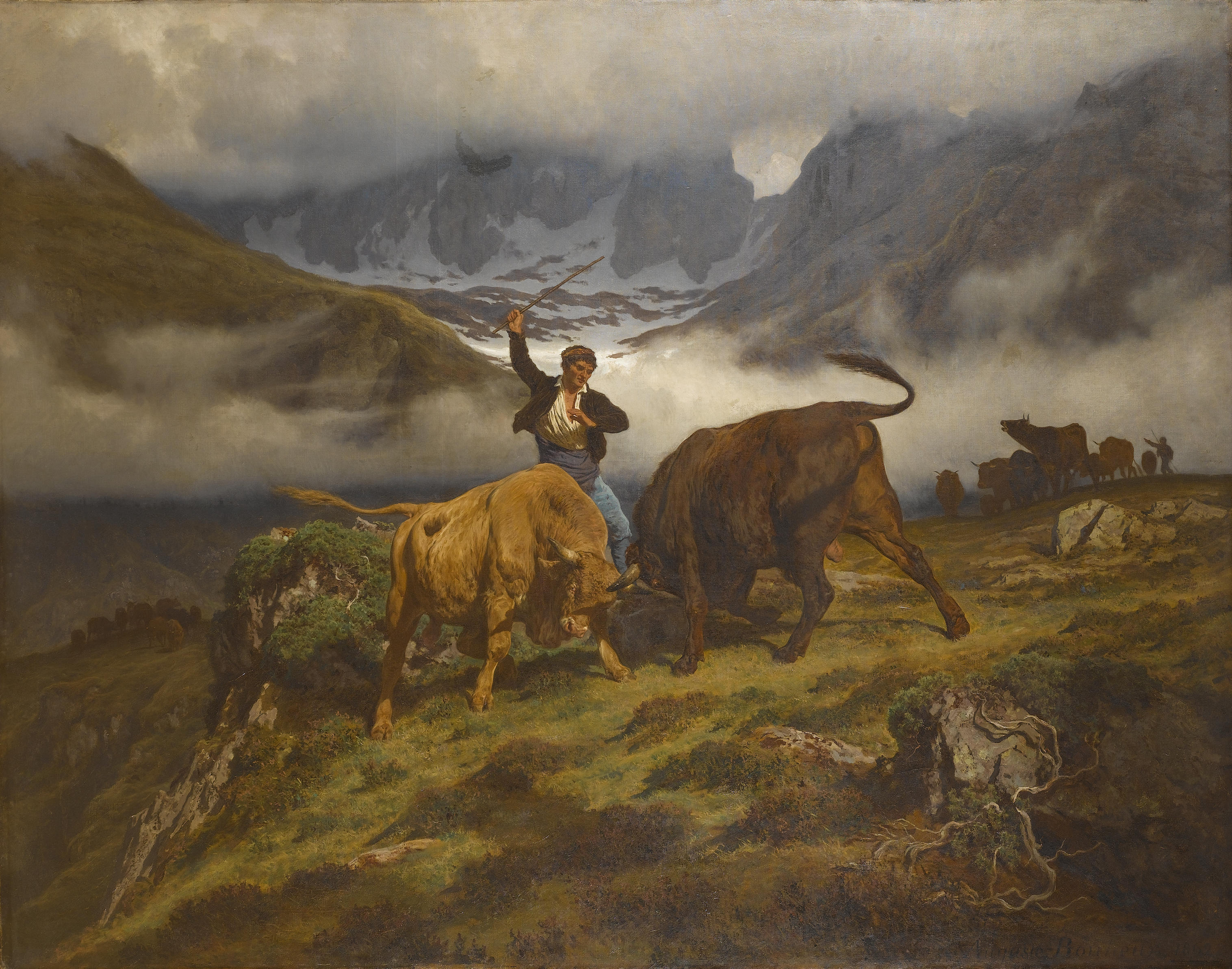
Le Combat, souvenir des Pyrénées

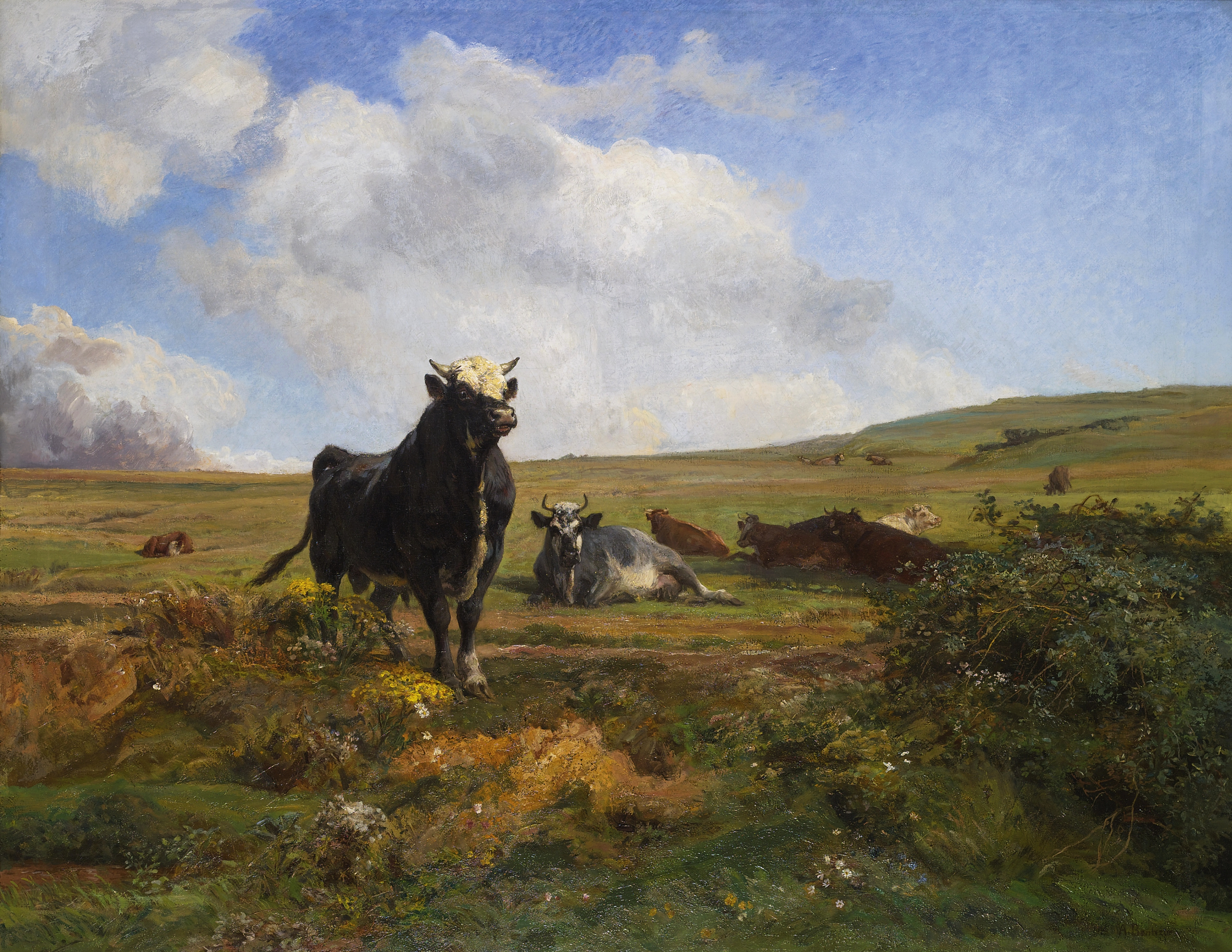
The chief of the herd

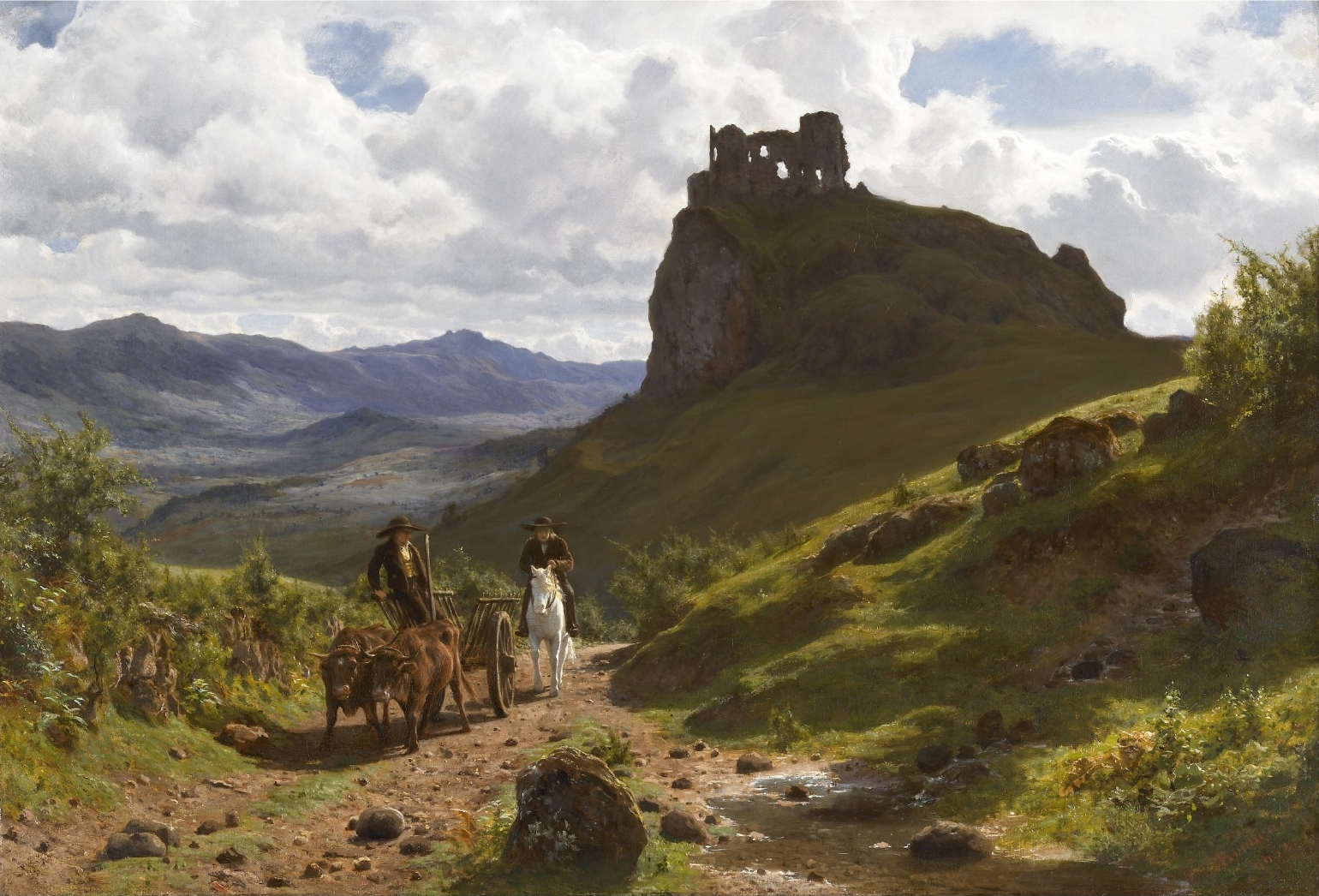
The Ruins of the Château d’Apchon

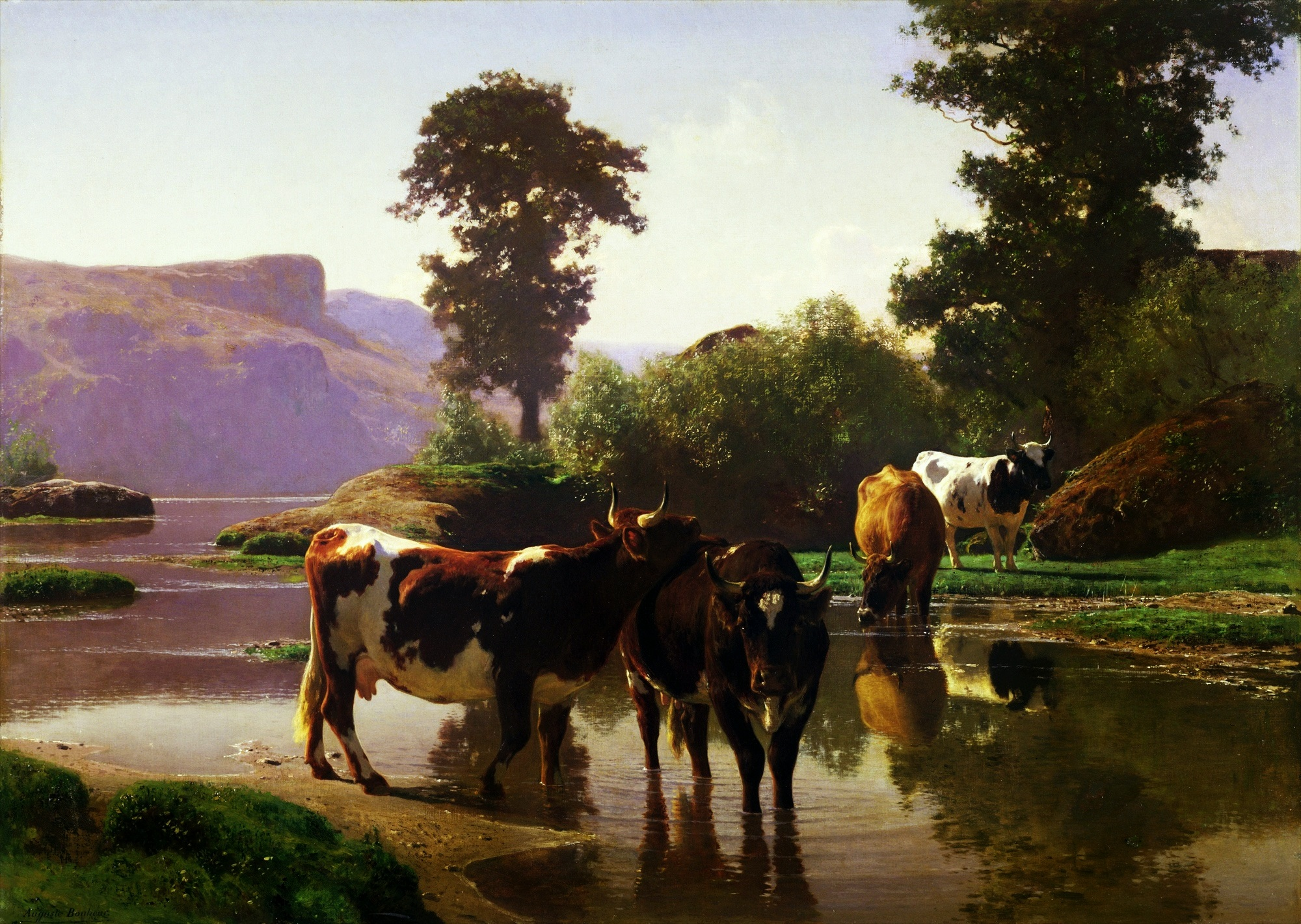
Pasture beside the lake

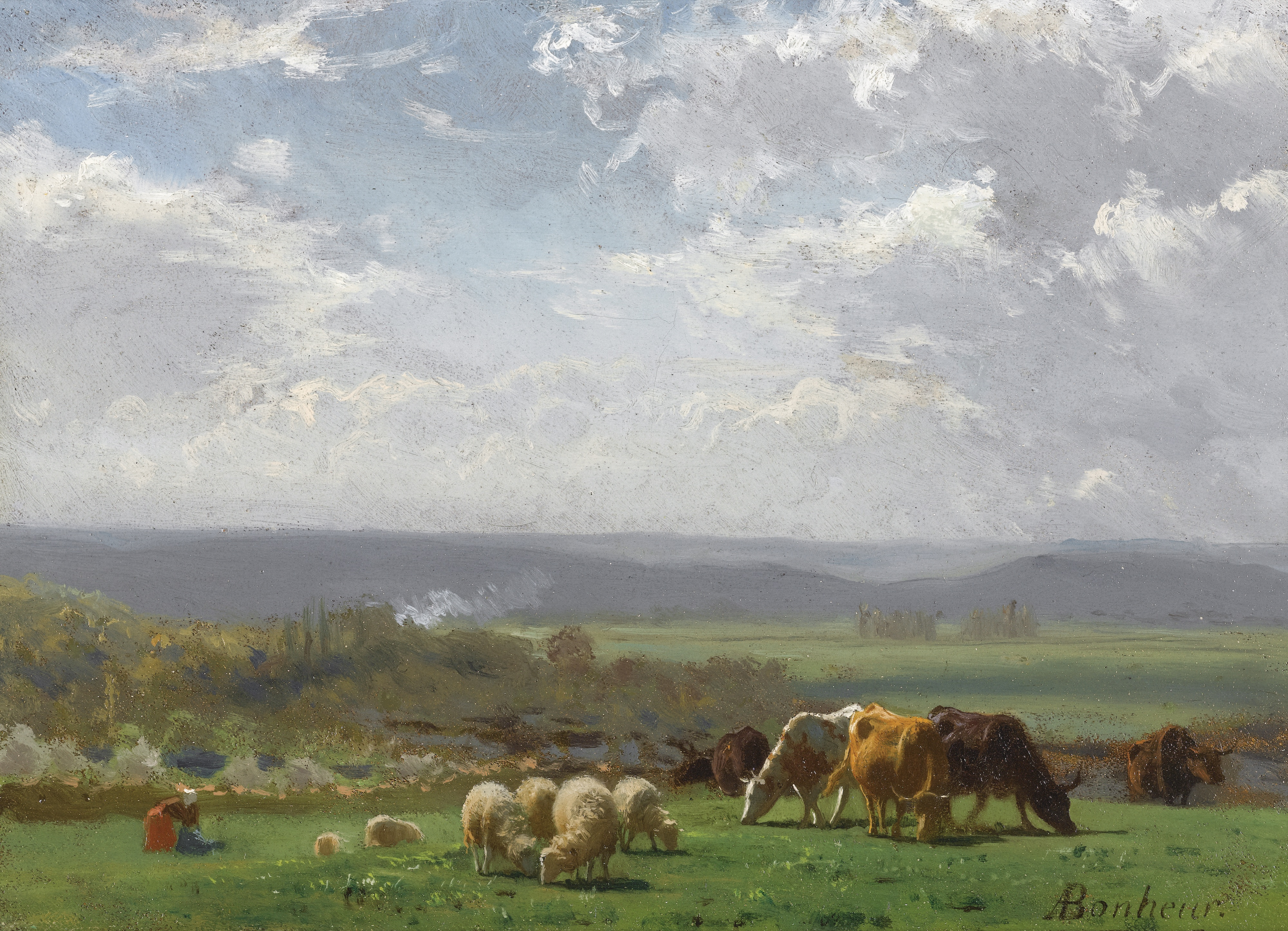
Scenery in the Auvergne: Early Morn

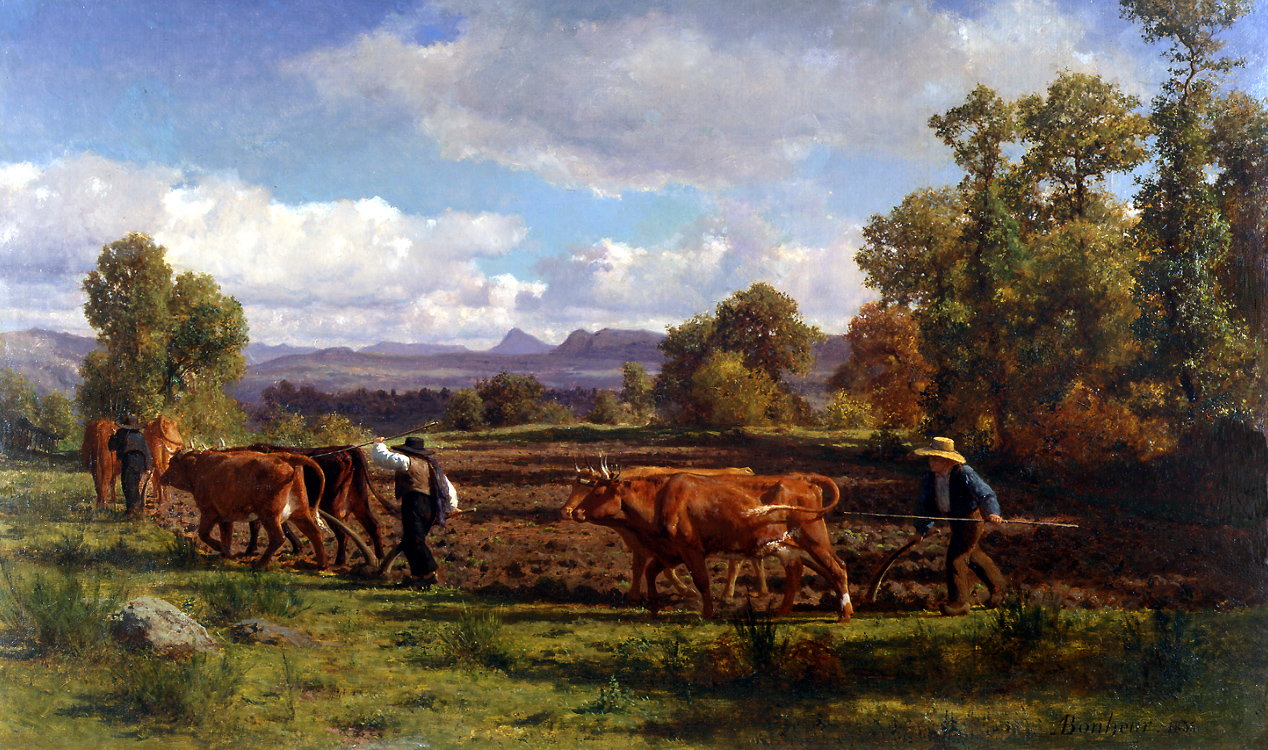
Plowing in the Nivernais

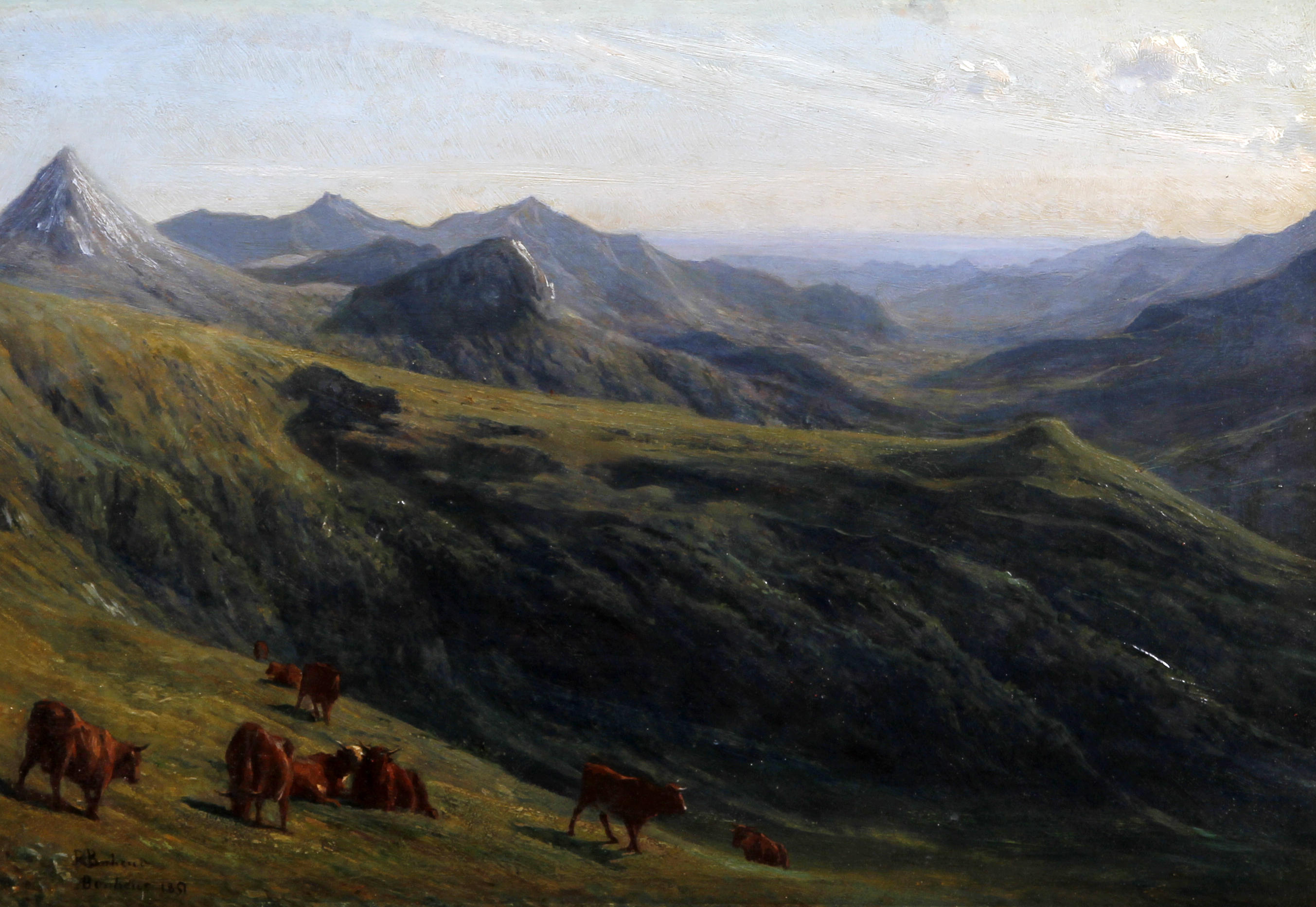
Auguste and Rosa Bonheur - Bovins sur une colline
