= Juliette Bonheur =

French painter (1830–1891)

- Born: 1830; Paris, France
- Died: 1891 (aged 60–61); Paris, France
- Known for: Painting
- Spouse: Hippolyte Peyrol
- Father: Oscar-Raymond Bonheur

Juliette Peyrol Bonheur (French: [ʒyljɛt bɔnœʁ]; 1830–1891) was a French painter. She was known for her animal paintings. She is the sister of Rosa Bonheur (1822–1899), Auguste Bonheur (1824–1884), and Isidore Bonheur (1827–1901).

== Biography ==
Peyrol Bonheur was born in Paris in 1830. She was trained in painting by her father as was her elder sister Rosa. Her mother was Sophie Bonheur (née Marquis), a piano teacher; she died when Peyrol Bonheur was a baby. Her father was Oscar-Raymond Bonheur, a landscape and portrait painter who encouraged his daughter's artistic talents.

She was married to Hippolyte Peyrol who owned a bronze foundry.

She exhibited her paintings at the Salon (Paris) from 1852 until 1889.

She died in Paris in 1891.

Peyrol Bonheur's work was exhibited at the Palace of Fine Arts at the 1893 World's Columbian Exposition in Chicago, Illinois.

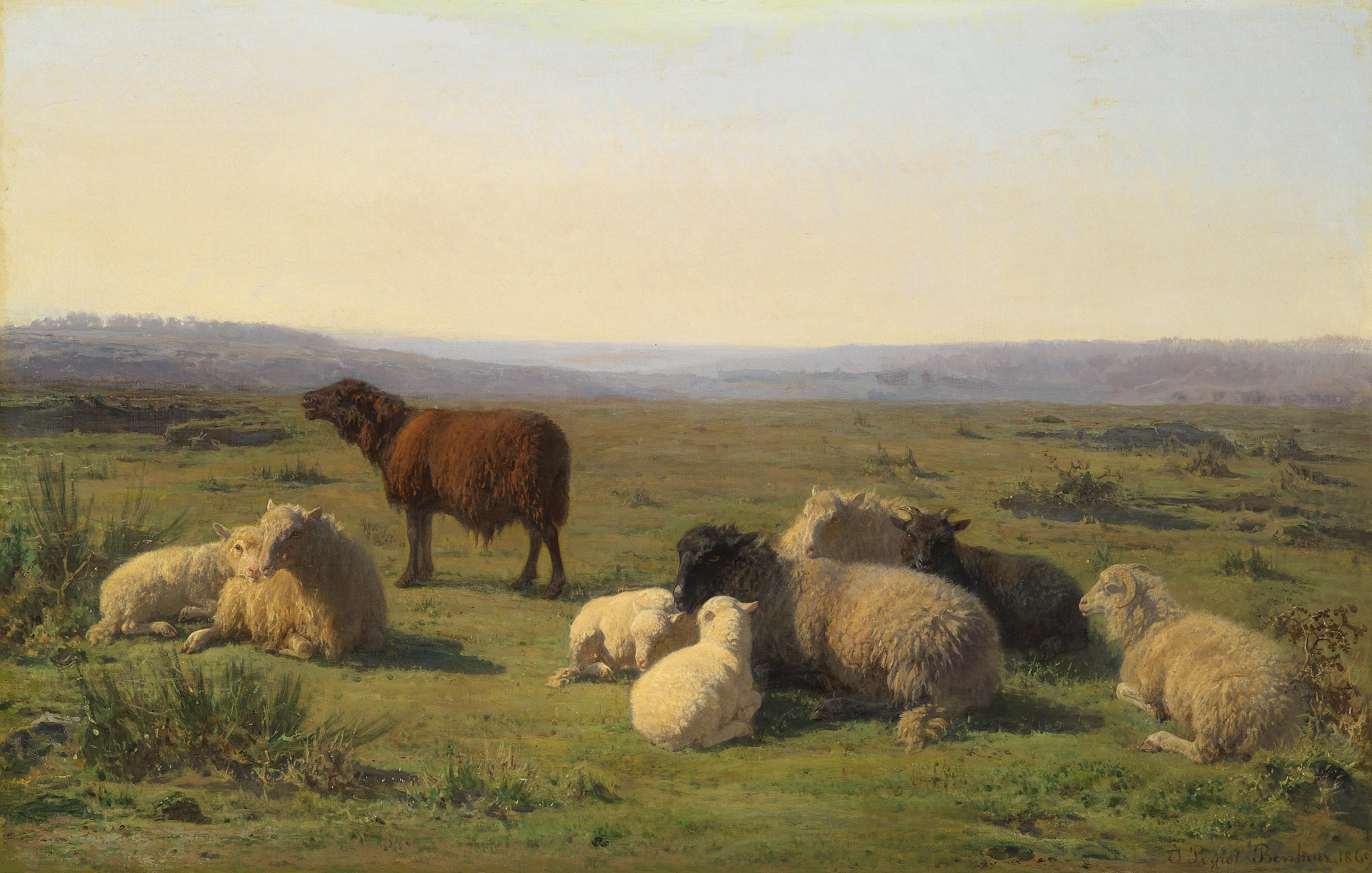
Juliette Peyrol Bonheur, Sheep Resting in the Meadow, 1869
