= Robert Burns (artist) =

Scottish painter, limner and designer

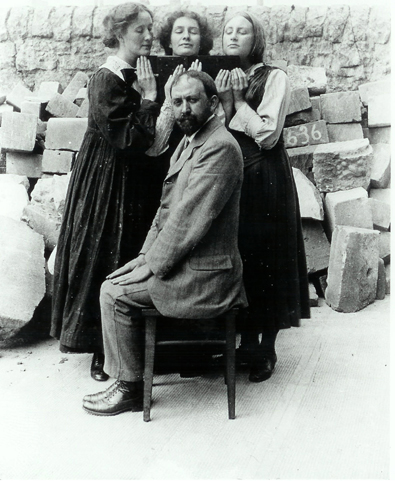

Robert Burns, HRSA, RSW (1869–1941) was a Scottish painter, limner and designer. He was an early exponent of the Art Nouveau style in Scotland and an outstanding decorative artist.

== Life ==
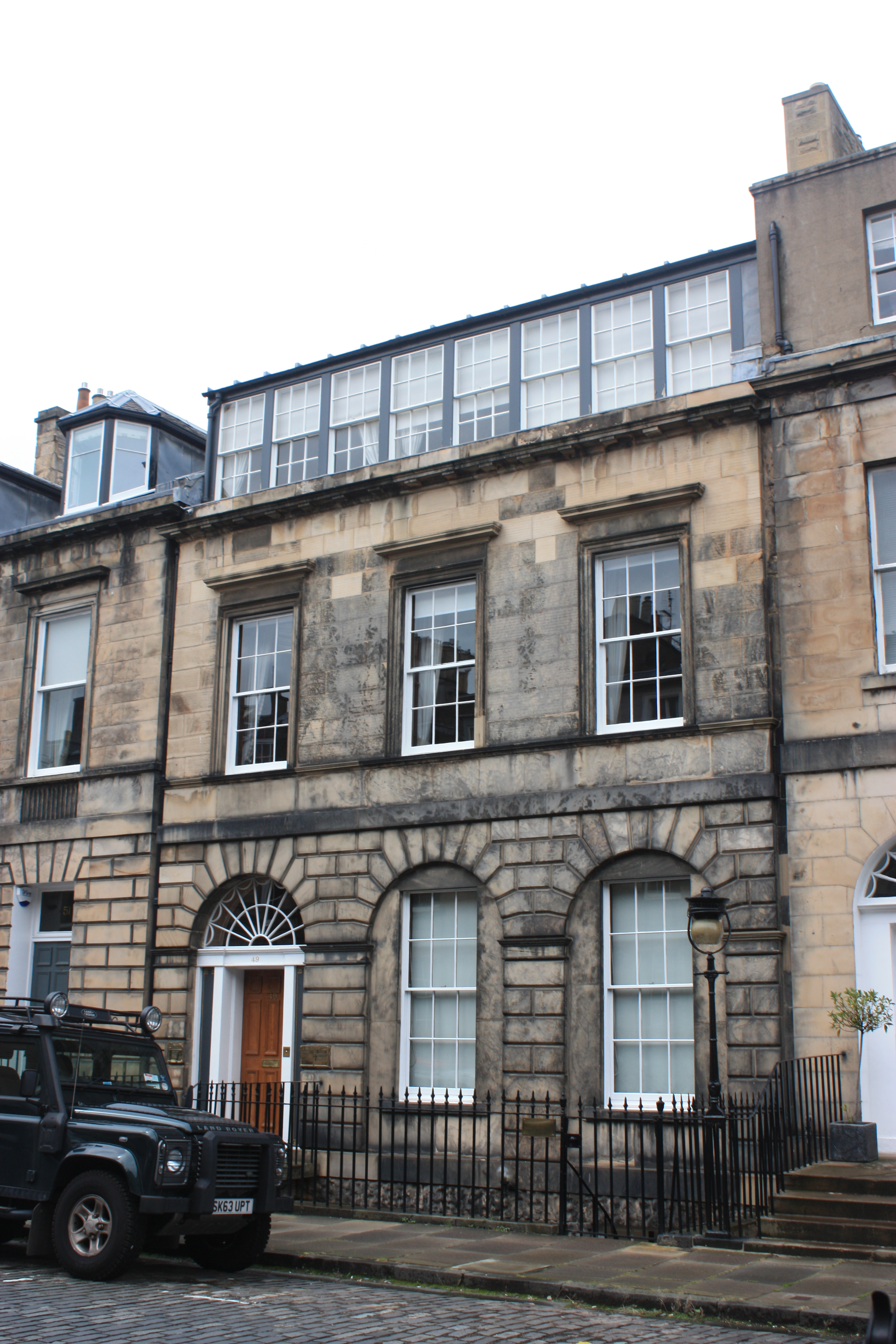
49 Northumberland Street, Edinburgh

Burns was born in Edinburgh in 1869. His father was Archibald Burns, a pioneer of photography originally from Hamilton. The family lived for a time at Rock House on the Calton Hill, in what had been the studio of Hill & Adamson. Robert was educated at the Royal High School and Dollar Academy.

He moved to Glasgow as a young man and attended evening classes at Glasgow School of Art. On being advised by Edward Arthur Walton to pursue a career in art, he left Scotland for London where he enrolled as a student at Professor Fred Brown's school at Westminster. In 1889 he moved to Paris and for the next two years he studied at the Académie Delécluse under Auguste Joseph Delécluse, Paul-Louis Delance and Edward Frederick Ertz. He was elected President of the Society of Scottish Artists in 1901. After a trip to Morocco in 1920, he returned to Edinburgh. In 1924 he was again elected president of the Society of Scottish Artists, serving in this role until 1927 He followed the example of the Arts and Crafts movement artists, employing a variety of materials in handicraft works with a view to furthering the relationship between arts, commerce, and industry.

Burns was associated with Patrick Geddes's Fin de Siècle Scottish cultural revival. He contributed illustrations to all four volumes of The Evergreen: A Northern Seasonal published by Patrick Geddes and Colleagues between 1895 and 1897. His Natura Naturans, which appeared in The Book of Winter in 1895 is believed to have influenced Gustav Klimt's Fishblood (1898). He also designed costumes for Geddes' historical pageants.

Burns's most famous and complete designs were for the Crawford's Tea Room (1926), which was located on Hanover Street just off Princes Street in Edinburgh.

Burns combined commercial work and teaching, becoming the Head of Drawing and Painting at the Edinburgh College of Art, where he taught from 1908 to 1919. As well as working as a painter of both mythological and direct landscape themes, Burns was a passionate limner and drew many fine books, influenced by both the Kelmscott Press and the Book of Kells. His landscape paintings, mainly in watercolour, often depicted the Pentland Hills south of Edinburgh, as well as the beaches of Iona. It was on Iona that Burns and his great friend and fellow artist William Caldwell Crawford, first met the poet and activist Janet Margaret Benson. Burns eventually became the godfather of two of their three children, Ruth and the Edinburgh composer Robert Crawford.

By the early 20th century Burns was already fairly successful, allowing him to purchase 49 Northumberland Street; a large Georgian town house in Edinburgh's New Town, where he converted the attic into a large studio space.

== Works ==
- Diana and Her Nymphs
- The Ballad of Sir Patrick Spens
- Sir Galahad
- Waiting for the Ferry
- The Window Seat
- Adieu Schubert
- Girl with Falcon
- John Knox preaching in St Giles
- Before the Looking Glass
- Woman at her Toilet
- Natura Naturans
- This is the Book of the House that Jack Built
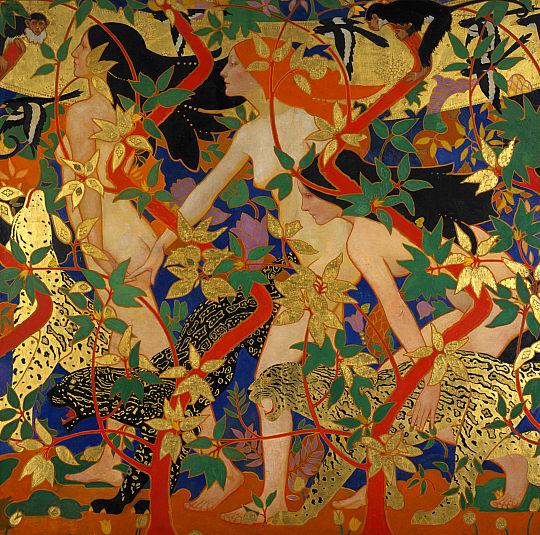
Diana and her Nymphs, mural painting from the Crawford's tearoom of Edinburgh, c. 1926
- The Song of Solomon: the Hunterian museum and art gallery at the University of Glasgow has a fine collection of plates from this work by Burns, with online images
- The Kirkcudbright galleries artistsfootsteps website has images of pictures by Burns, plus biographical information.
