= Josephine Hale =

American painter (1878–1961)

- Born: Josephine Adeline Bruneau; May 27, 1878; Sioux Point, South Dakota, U.S.
- Died: October 5, 1961 (aged 83)
- Known for: Painting

Josephine Hale (May 27, 1878 – October 5, 1961) was an early Montana painter and nurse in the Red Cross during World War I. She spent much of her adult life in Great Falls, Montana, but traveled throughout France and the United States.

== Personal life ==
Josephine Hale was born in 1878 as Josephine Adeline Bruneau. The Bruneau family had eleven children, of which Hale was the youngest. Most of her siblings were born in Quebec however her family moved to the United States before Hale was born and settled near Sioux Point, South Dakota. In 1896 Hale graduated from a high school in Sioux City, Iowa. Two years later, at the age of twenty, Hale moved to Great Falls, MT where three of her siblings already lived. She began teaching in Eden, ten miles away from Great Falls, after passing her teacher certification test. The Montana Museum of Art and Culture states that it is likely she taught at "Canyon Schoolhouse, in the Eden area."

While in Great Falls, Josephine Hale met her husband, wealthy rancher Walter George Hale. The two married August 22, 1901 but the marriage lasted only three years. Walter Hale contracted and then died of tuberculosis. After her husband's death, Hale retained ownership of the ranch she had owned with him, and rented it to tenants as a source of income beginning in 1907. In 1910 Hale purchased a three-house lot in Great Falls which she used to board family members. She also created studio space in one of the attics.

In 1917 Hale joined the Red Cross as a nurse to serve during WWI. While living in France, Hale met George Hepburn Robertson and fell in love. Robertson served as the Director of Transportation for the American Red Cross, which is likely where they met. Although Hale never married Robertson it is likely that part of her reason for returning to France later in life was to continue the relationship. She remained in France until 1926 when she returned to the US and began attending school for interior decoration. Hale returned to France less than a year later to continue her art education.

In 1935 Hale moved back to Great Falls, MT where she lived during the Great Depression and WWII. During the ten years after her return from Europe she created a prolific amount of art work, she also continued nursing, a skill she had picked up in the Red Cross, for the rest of her life, including volunteering during WWII at Columbus Hospital.

Hale died in 1961 at the age of 83.

== Red Cross ==
World War I began in 1914, and in 1917 Josephine Hale enlisted in the Red Cross. At the time the Red Cross had an age limit on enlistment, and the forty year old Hale lied about her age, stating she was thirty-five, in order to enlist. Her ability to speak French was viewed as an asset and she paid for her own passage to Europe in order to ensure her acceptance.

Hale traveled from New York to London aboard a transport vessel named the Corinthia. For protection her ship was accompanied by a cruiser, U-boat destroyers, airplanes and hydroplanes. After she arrived in London, Hale took a train to Paris.

Hale's first assignment in France was in Paris at the Gara de l'Est canteen where she took medical classes and improved her language skills. After her training in Paris, Hale worked in canteens near the front, at Bordeaux. She would later open her own canteen in Marseille. Hale wrote in her diary about her experiences working with soldiers:

"because of my knowledge of French I am assigned on the French and Belgian side. They are so different from our boys and so very polite but they are accustomed to being waited on so it is a bit harder on the waiter. They seem very much pleased to have an American to talk and joke with them and how they love to air every bit of English that they know. The Americans are all about the same age, but the others range from 55 to 18 -- grey haired men and fresh faced boys and everyone ready to smile back at you every chance they get. It seems they take this war as their work and it is here to do."

Hale also recorded her experiences through at the front photography including images of damage caused by bombs at Fort de la Pompelle, a cathedral in ruins and the destruction of a forest.

After Armistice, Hale extended her visa in order to continue working in devastated areas. In October 1920 she received her nursing degree from the Societe Francaise de Secours in Paris and in 1924 she was awarded the Médaille de la Reconnaissance française by the French government.

== Art ==
In early 1926 Hale moved to Boston and began attending courses at the New York School of Interior of Decoration. Her professors recommended that she pursue painting as a degree program.

By October 14, 1926 Hale returned to Paris in order to continue studying interior design but the next year she began attending the Académie Delécluse, where she began her full-time study of painting and drawing. At the academy she studied under Auguste Joseph Delécluse, Eugene Delécluse, de Courmon and Jean-Paul Laurens. Later, she would describe her time studying art in France as "the happiest years of my life." Following nine years improving her skills, Hale received accolades in the Salon of 1934 and was invited to galleries and arts organizations.

Hale produced paintings with a wide variety of subjects including still lifes, florals, landscapes, portraits and nudes. Stylistically she was influenced by her experience with interior design in her use of fabric and floral patterns, French Impressionists and Post-Impressionists, the Fauves use of animated lines in landscapes, and the European tradition of plein air painting. She also consistently referenced the book The Art Spirit by Robert Henri in her sketchbooks. Hale built her body of work by travelling extensively including visits to French Brittany, Monaco, Italy, Spain, Holland, Belgium, Morocco, the Sonoran Desert and Mexico.

In 1995 Vivian Ellis and Fran Walton gifted the Josephine Hale art collection to the Montana Museum of Art and Culture, which is the primary repository of her work. MMAC exhibit "Intimate West: Women Artists in Montana 1880-1944." The goal of the exhibit was to show a different interpretation of the American West than the traditional representations by artists like C.M. Russel and Edgar S. Paxson. Hale's works in the exhibit include studies and images of Glacier National Park that are described as "long, thoughtful studies of the natural world" by MMAC curator Jeremy Camwell.

Hale was also the subject of an exhibit, "The Life and Art of Josephine Hale, 1878-1961," at the Hockaday Museum of Art.
