= Delécluse =

Delécluse is a French surname. People with this surname include:

- Auguste Joseph Delécluse (1855-1928), French painter and founder of the Académie Delécluse
- Jacques Delécluse (1933–2015), French percussionist and composer
- Ulysse Delécluse (1907–1995), French clarinetist and professor at the Paris Conservatory

== See also ==
- Étienne-Jean Delécluze, French painter
