= Johann Berthelsen =

American painter (1883–1972)

- Born: Johann Henrik Carl Berthelsen; July 25, 1883; Copenhagen, Denmark
- Died: April 3, 1972 (aged 88); Greenwich, CT
- Education: Svend Svendsen
- Known for: Painting
- Movement: Impressionism

Johann Henrik Carl Berthelsen (July 25, 1883 – April 3, 1972) was an American Impressionist painter, as well as having a career as a professional singer and voice teacher. Essentially self-taught as an artist, he is best known for his poetic paintings of New York City, often in snow.

== Background ==
Johann Henrik Carl Berthelsen was born in Copenhagen, Denmark. He was the seventh of seven sons born to Conrad and Dorothea Karen Berthelsen. His father was a tenor with the Royal Opera and his mother was a nurse. Following the divorce of the parents, in 1890 his mother brought the children to America, joining her sister in Manistee, Michigan. Soon they settled in Manitowoc, Wisconsin.

Johann developed an early interest in singing, acting, drawing, and painting. He dropped out of school after the fifth grade and worked in various jobs. He moved to Chicago at age eighteen, planning to pursue a career in theater. An old friend who was studying voice at the Chicago Musical College encouraged him to pursue singing. Upon auditioning at the school, Berthelsen was offered a full scholarship. While a student there he won two gold medals.

== Career ==
Following his graduation in 1905, he toured the United States and Canada, performing in operas, Gilbert & Sullivan operettas, and concerts until 1910, when he began teaching voice at the Chicago Musical College. In his spare time he pursued painting, with encouragement and some instruction from the Norwegian-American Impressionist painter Svend Svendsen.

In 1913, Berthelsen moved to Indianapolis to become the head of the voice department at Indianapolis Conservatory of Music. He formed a lifelong friendship with painter Wayman Adams, who was the same age and had studied with William Merritt Chase and Robert Henri. Adams would paint many portraits of Berthelsen, including a life-sized image of his friend about to go on stage for a concert. Adams is credited by some as having provided painting instruction to Berthelsen, and they may have had a double wedding in 1918.

In 1920, Adams (who was married to a fellow artist) and Berthelsen decided to move to New York City to further their careers. Berthelsen opened a private school of voice in the Rodin Studios building. According to the Berthelsen Conservancy, one of his pupils was a singer, dancer and entertainer named Helenya Kaschewski, whom he married on March 15, 1928. They had three children—a daughter, Karen, and two sons, John and Lee. He continued to pursue art, and in 1925 he was elected to the American Watercolor Society. He also mastered the pastel medium during the 1920s.

With the Great Depression and stock market crash of 1929 Berthelsen lost his voice students, and the family had to sell many of their possessions and move to an ever-smaller series of apartments. A fellow artist suggested painting in oils, which he began to do, and he had gradually increasing success in selling his canvases. In the mid-1930s he was also involved in several New Deal art projects. He joined the Salmagundi Club in 1935 and remained a member until his death.

In 1942 the family moved to rural New Milford, Connecticut, where Berthelsen painted many views of the surroundings. But his most popular canvases represented New York City scenes. They were collected by prominent figures including William Randolph Hearst, Richard E. Berlin, Frank Sinatra, Ethel Merman, and Dinah Shore. Today paintings by Berthelsen may be found at the Hirshorn Museum and Sculpture Garden, Sheldon Swope Art Museum, the Butler Institute of American Art, and several other public collections.

In 1950 the family moved back to New York City, in part because of the high demand for his work and easy access to galleries. He exhibited his work at the Barbizon-Plaza Galleries, the Allan Rich Gallery, and the Jean Bohne Gallery, among others. He continued to paint well into his eighties. In 1971 he was hit by a car, which led to a decline in health and ultimately his death the following year.

== Awards ==
- Albert Erskine Prize for Pastel Art Institute of Chicago (1928)
- Holcombe Prize in Indianapolis (1946)

== Public collections ==
- Hickory Museum, Hickory, North Carolina
- Indiana State Museum, Indianapolis
- Indiana University, The Daily Family Memorial Collection of Paintings, Bloomington, Indiana
- Museum of Texas Tech University, Lubbock, Texas
- Richmond Art Museum, Richmond, Indiana
- Sheldon Swope Art Museum, Terre Haute, Indiana
- Wake Forest University, Winston-Salem, North Carolina

== See also ==
- American Impressionism

== Related reading ==
- Leland G. Howard (1988), Johann Berthelsen: An American Master Painter, ex. cat., Sheldon Swope Art Museum
