= Georges Callot =

French artist and educator

- Born: 1857; Paris, France
- Died: 23 June 1903; Paris, France
- Education: École des Arts Décoratifs, École des Beaux-Arts
- Known for: painting, educator

Georges Callot (English: /kæˈloʊ/ ka-LOH, French: [ʒɔʁʒ kalo]; 1857–1903) a French artist and educator, known for his nude, allegorical, and genre paintings. He also worked as a decorative painter.

== Biography ==
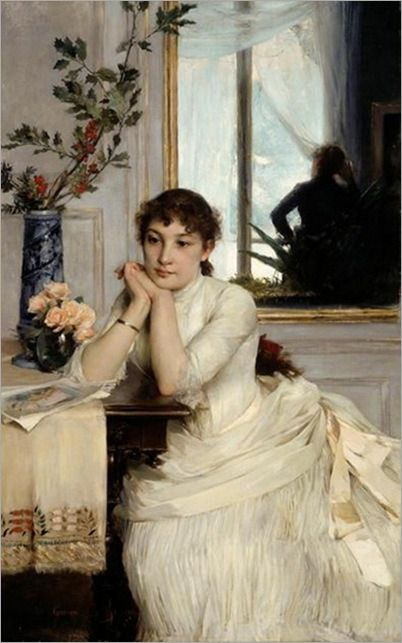
Georges Callot, Portrait de femme où l'attente (1886)

Georges Callot was born 1857 in Paris, France. Callot studied at the École des Arts Décoratifs and then at the École des Beaux-Arts with Louis-Émile Adan.

Callot first participated in the Salon in 1877. In 1890, he joined the Société Nationale des Beaux-Arts as a member. Callot taught classes at Académie Delécluse, an atelier-style art school and he was one of the main instructors.

Callot painted, La Philosophie (1903) for the Hôtel de Ville, Paris.

=== Death and legacy ===
Georges Callot died on 23 June 1903 in Paris. His work can be found in various public museum collections including Art Renewal Center, Châlons-en-Champagne, Musée d'Orsay, among others.

In the Spanish book, Lesbianas, Discursos y Representaciones (2008), Callot is named as one of the many artists that created anti-feminist work. Other artists labeled as having anti-feminist work in the book included Eliseu Visconti, Pierre-Georges Jeanniot, Louis de Schryver, and Joseph Granié.
