= Julia Beatrice How =

British painter

- Born: 16 October 1867; Devon, United Kingdom
- Died: 19 August 1932 (aged 66); Hoddesdon, United Kingdom
- Known for: Painting

Julia Beatrice How (16 October 1865 – 19 August 1932) was a British painter active in France.

== Biography ==
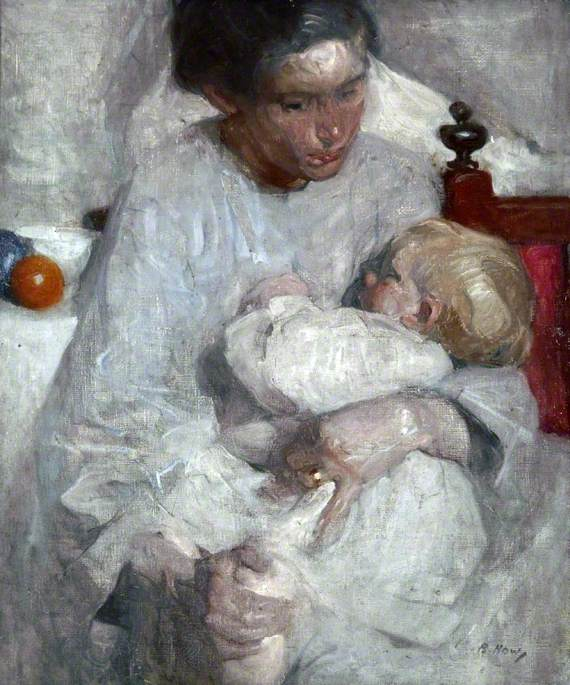
Maternité, collection Atkinson Art Gallery

How was born in Bideford, Devon to a family of silversmiths. She was the youngest of her family, and both of her parents died before she was an adult. She moved with her family to Bournesmouth and attended the Herkomer School at Bushey, Hertfordshire. She then moved to Paris to study at the Academie Delecluse around 1893, and began exhibiting in 1902 at the Societe Nationale des Beaux-Arts, where she exhibited around 147 works throughout her career. While in Paris, she was introduced to the work of Rodin, Polin, Besnard and Lucien Simon, whose works may have influenced her art. She eventually set up a workshop in Étaples. How painted various subjects, including nudes, portraits of children, and fruit and flower studies, and worked using a variety of media, including pastels, crayons, oils, and watercolors.

How was "considered on par with Berthe Morisot and Mary Cassatt" in France and America, but was "somewhat neglected in her country of origin." How's works were included in various exhibitions in France, Britain, and abroad. These exhibitions included the Royal Scottish Academy (1915–36), the Royal Glasgow Institute (1913-39), the Royal Academy (1924–36), the Liverpool Autumn Exhibitions (1910 and 1912), Beaux Arts Gallery (1927), Galeries Georges Petit (1919 and 1926), Galeries des Artistes Francais (1928), Salon des Tuileries (1923–24), and the Carnegie Exhibition (1910-1914 and 1925). After her death in 1932, a memorial exhibition was held at the Beaux Arts Gallery in 1933 and at the New Burlington Galleries in 1935. How won an Honourable Mention at the Carnegie Exhibition in 1914 and was elected as an Associate of the Societe Nationale des Beaux-Arts in 1904.

In 1905 two of her paintings, In a Dutch Cottage and Le Repas were included in Women Painters of the World, an overview of women painters with the remark "Miss Beatrice How... gives us, most delightfully, the very sentiment of the country people she paints." How is most recognized for her art depicting mothers and children. According to the Kourd Gallery, "Her fragile technique and the masterly handling of the lowest tones give so much vitality to her paintings that they seem almost transparent."

How never married or had children. She died in 1932 after falling at her niece's home in Hertford.

In June 2024, an exhibition devoted to her will be held at the Etaples-sur-Mer museum (Maison du Port départemental). Curator Yann Gobert-Sergent published his latest research on the life and work of Béatrice How in the exhibition catalogue.

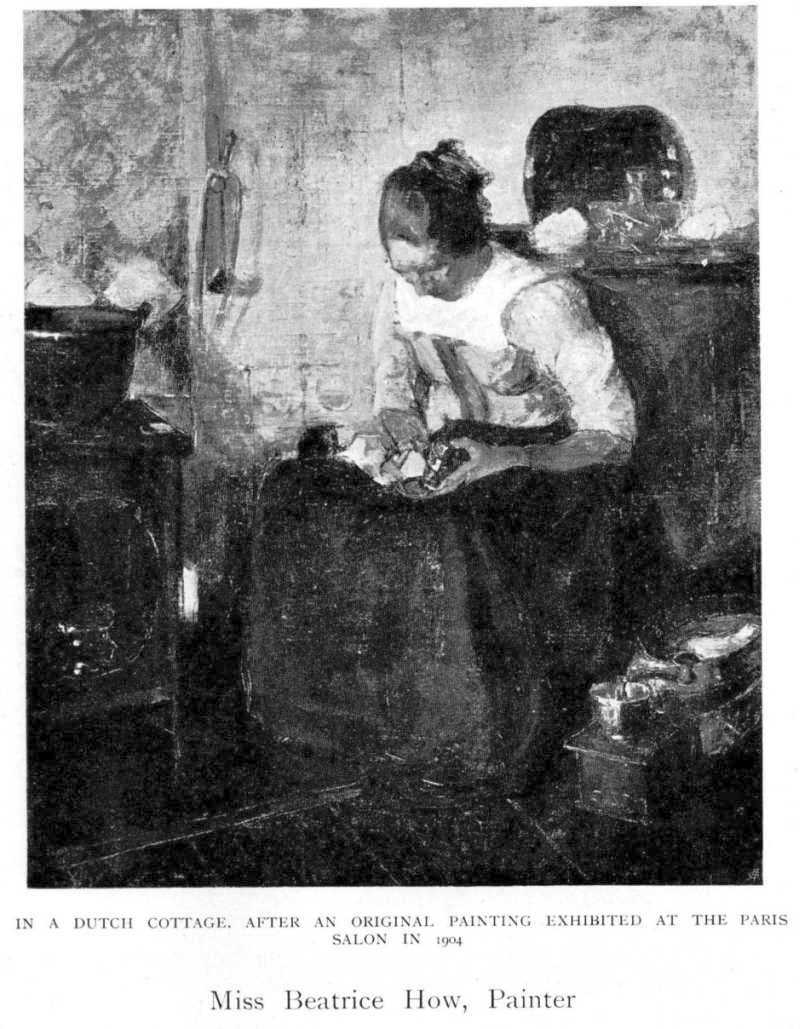
In a Dutch Cottage, shown at the Paris Salon in 1904

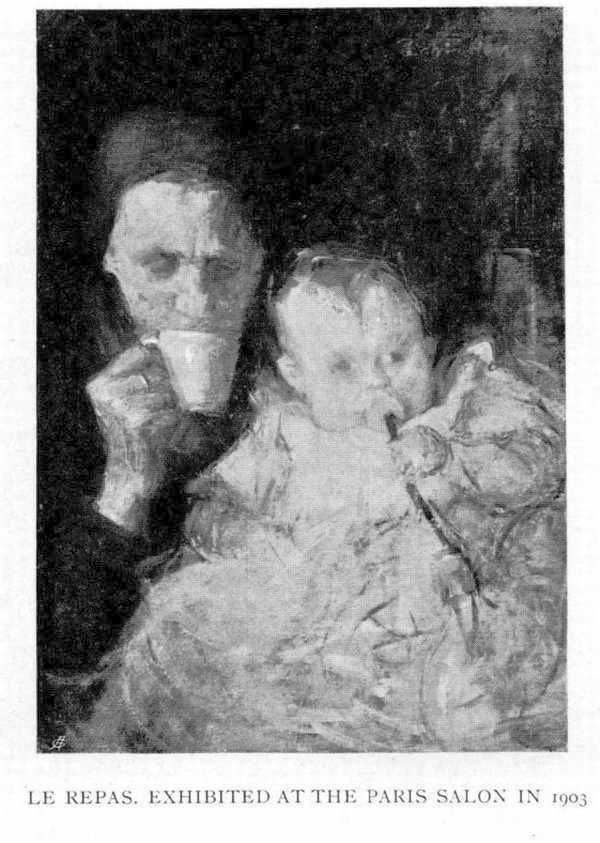
Le Repas

== Bibliography ==
Yann Gobert-Sergent, Femmes artistes de la Côte d'Opale (1880-1930), Département du Pas-de-Calais, éditions Invenit, Lille, juin 2024, 96 pages.
