= Alice Sarah Kinkead =

Irish artist

Alice Sarah "Kinkie" Kinkead (1871–1926) was an Irish artist, she known as a painter and later in life a silversmith.

== Life ==
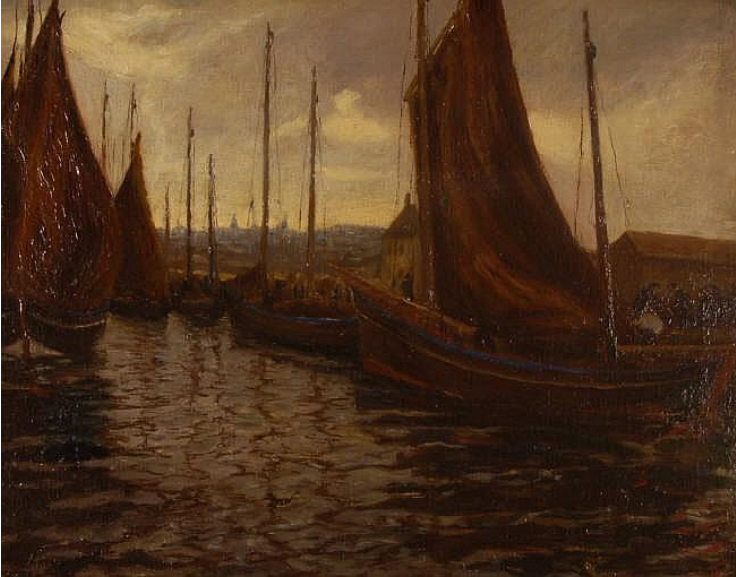
Oil painting by Kinkead (1904)

Kinkead was born in Tuam in Galway in 1871. Her father, Dr. Richard John Kinkead, GP (1844–1928), was appointed professor of Gynaecology at National University of Ireland, Galway in 1876, wherein the family moved to Forster House in the town.

Kinkead attended Académie Delécluse in Paris and also was educate in Galway. She moved permanently to London in her career as an artist. Her associates included Edith Anna Somerville, Violet Florence Martin, Lady Gregory, W.B. and Jack Yeats, Frances Perkins, Ethel Smyth.

Her brother Francis died in a tragic drowning accident on Lough Corrib in August 1887. Her surviving brother, Captain Richard Kinkead, R.A.M.C., was killed in action at Ypres on 30 October 1914.

While in Corsica in 1921, Alice Kinkead befriended the writer, Joseph Conrad. This friendship led to her painting his last portrait in 1924, shortly before his death.
