= Svend Rasmussen Svendsen =

American painter

Svend Rasmussen Svendsen (March 21, 1864 – September 6, 1945) was a Norwegian American impressionist artist. Svendsen is most known for his rural scenes, marine views, and snowy landscapes of Norway.

== Background ==
Svend Rasmussen Svendsen was born at Nittedal in Akershus, Norway. He was the son of Rasmus and Marie Svendsen. Shortly thereafter his family moved to Kristiania (now Oslo) where Svendsen received his primary education. In 1881, he immigrated to America and settled in Chicago, Illinois.

== Career ==
Svendsen had studied with Norwegian painter and engraver Fritz Thaulow. Svendsen also studied with Edward F. Ertz, Professor of Watercolor at the Académie Delécluse in Paris. Svendsen exhibited at the Chicago Art Institute, the National Academy of Design, and the Pennsylvania Academy of Fine Arts. His paintings were shown at the Chicago Norske Klub and at Minnesota State Fair. His art was also featured at the Pan-American Exposition in Buffalo, NY during 1901.

Since his death, the art work of Svend Svendsen has been included in exhibitions featured at St. Olaf College, at the University of Minnesota and at the Spanierman Gallery in Chicago. His art is on display at the National Museum of American Art at the Smithsonian Institution.

== Awards ==
- Young Fortnightly prize by the Chicago Art Institute (1895)
- Bronze medal at the St. Louis Exposition (1904)

== Personal life ==
He was married to May Isabel Newton (1874-1950) with whom he had five children. Svend Svendsen died in Chicago during 1945.
