= Lydia Purdy Hess =

American artist (1866–1936)

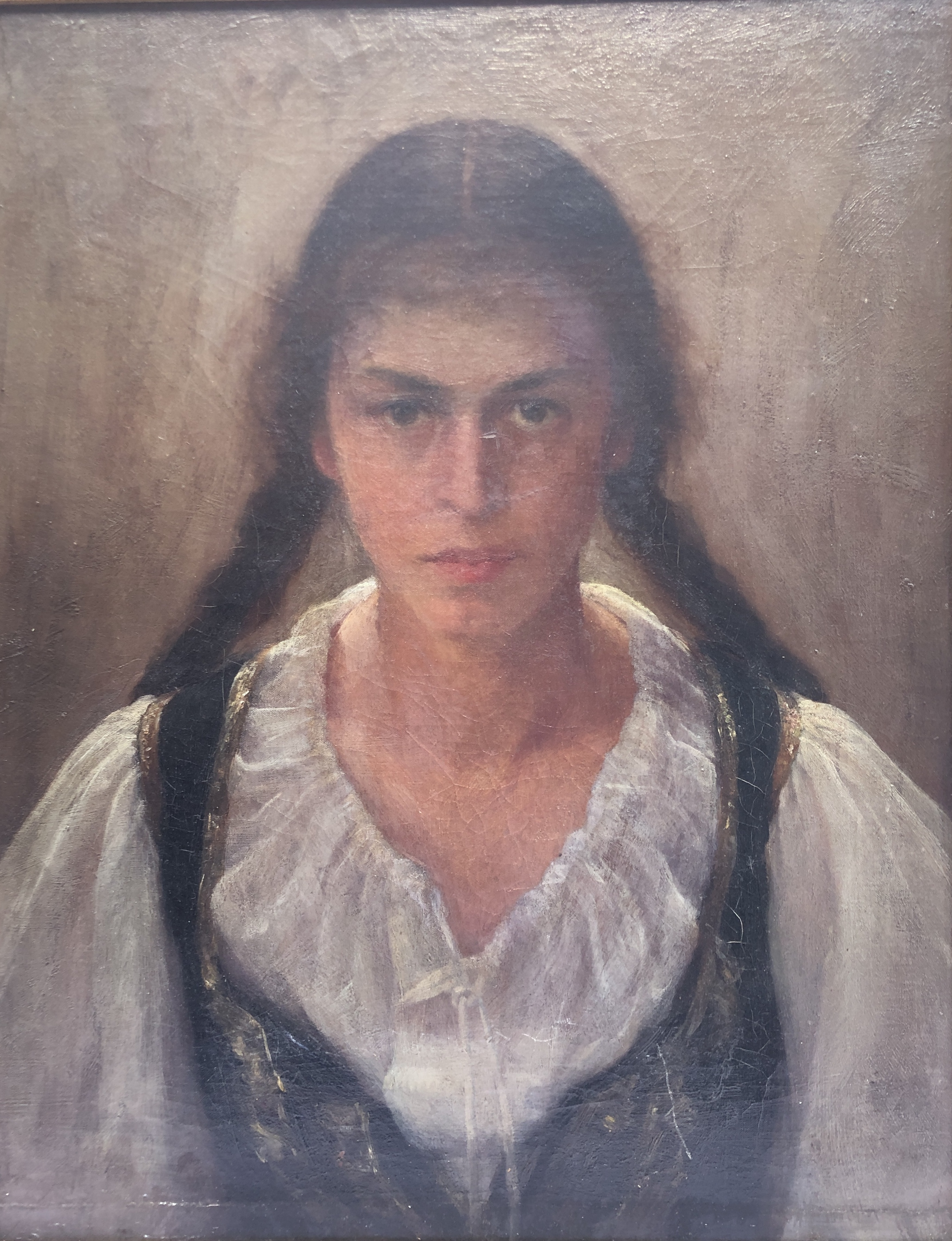
Self-portrait, 1890s

Lydia Purdy Hess (April 8, 1866 – November 30, 1936) was an American artist best known for her Portrait of Miss E. H., which was exhibited at the Paris Salon de la Société Nationale des Beaux-Arts, the Pennsylvania Academy of Fine Arts, and the World's Columbian Exposition in Chicago in 1893.

== Early life and education ==
Lydia Purdy Hess was born on April 8, 1866, in Newaygo, Michigan. She attended the School of the Art Institute of Chicago, graduating in 1886. According to School of the Art Institute records, she studied with Désiré Laugée at Académie Delécluse, and taught at the School from 1891 to 1895. Hess also served as assistant to the sculptor Lorado Taft. In 1894, Hess was in residence at St. Charles, Illinois.

== Career ==
Hess's Portrait of Miss E. H. was exhibited at the Paris Salon de la Société Nationale des Beaux-Arts in 1892; at the Pennsylvania Academy of Fine Arts in Philadelphia early in 1893; and at the World's Columbian Exposition in Chicago later in 1893. The oil painting is on exhibit at Orchard Lawn, the home of the Mineral Point Historical Society. The subject of the portrait, Miss Ena Hutchison, attended school at the Art Institute of Chicago with Hess. They traveled to Paris together in 1891 to study at the Académie Julian, one of the first art schools to admit women. That year, Hess began her studies at the Académie Delécluse in France, and later she attended classes with James Abbott McNeill Whistler.

Hess married Charles Doak Lowry on June 28, 1895, in Chicago, Illinois. On their two-month honeymoon, the couple floated down the Ohio River from Pittsburgh, Pennsylvania to Ripley, Ohio in a boat called The Double Ell; Hess sketched and painted. Lydia and Charles Lowry went on to have five children, the youngest of whom was noted biochemist Oliver Howe Lowry.

== Death ==
Hess died on November 30, 1936, in Evanston, Illinois.

== Gallery ==
Selected works by Lydia Purdy Hess Lowry
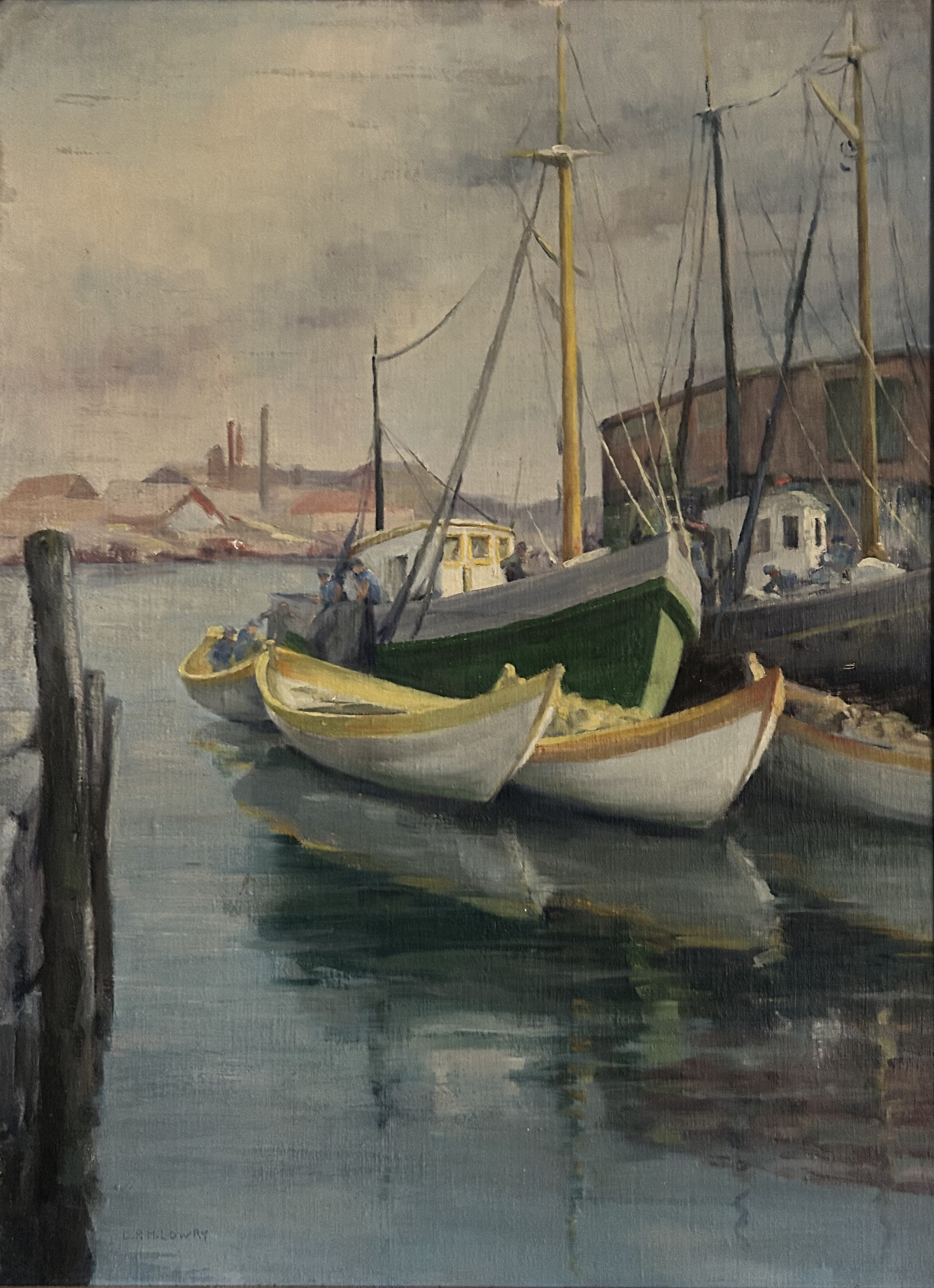
Oil painting of boats moored in a harbor

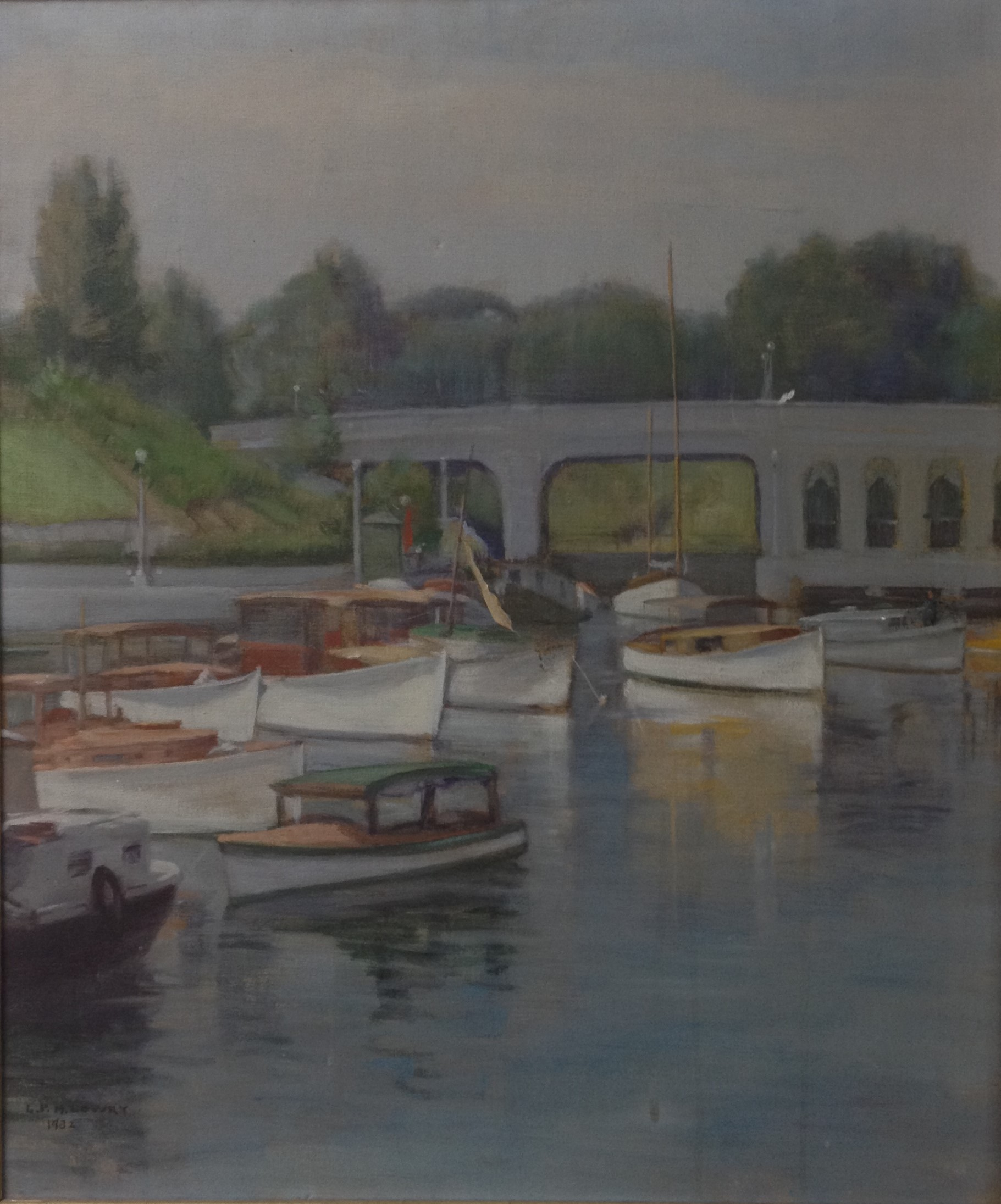
Oil painting of boat in a harbor

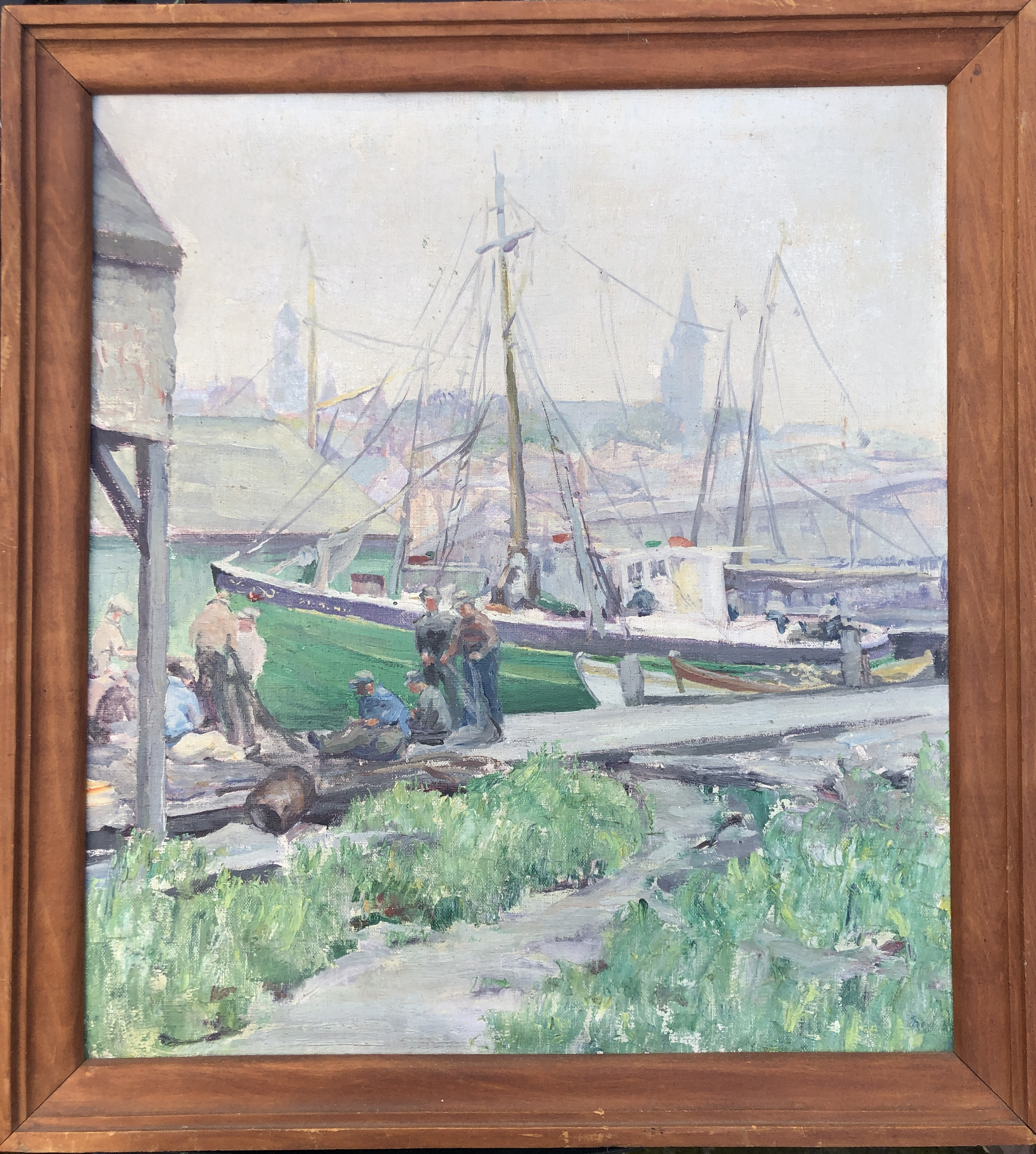
Oil painting of boats in a harbor in Gloucester, MA

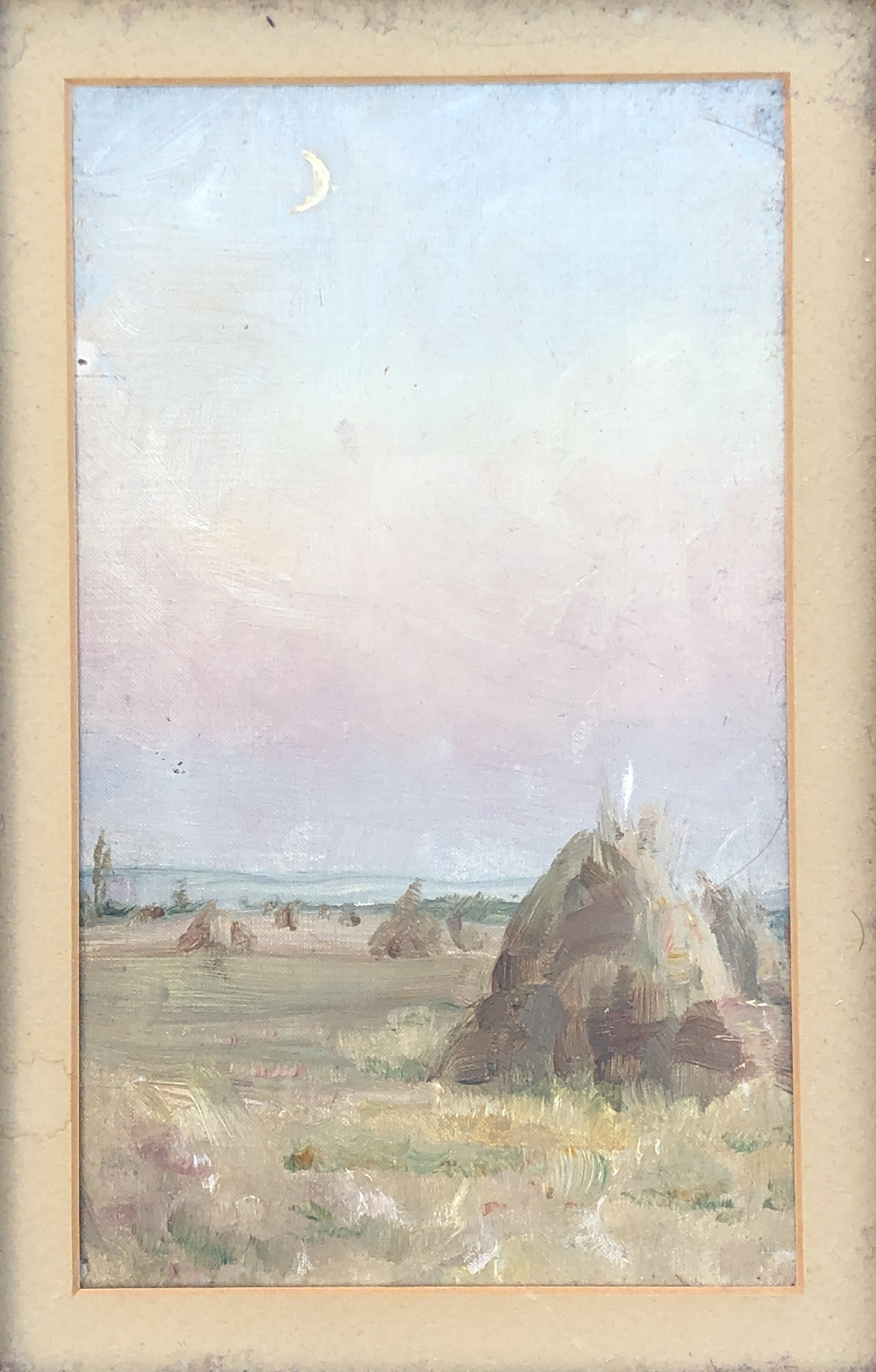
Oil painting of a hay field with hay stacks

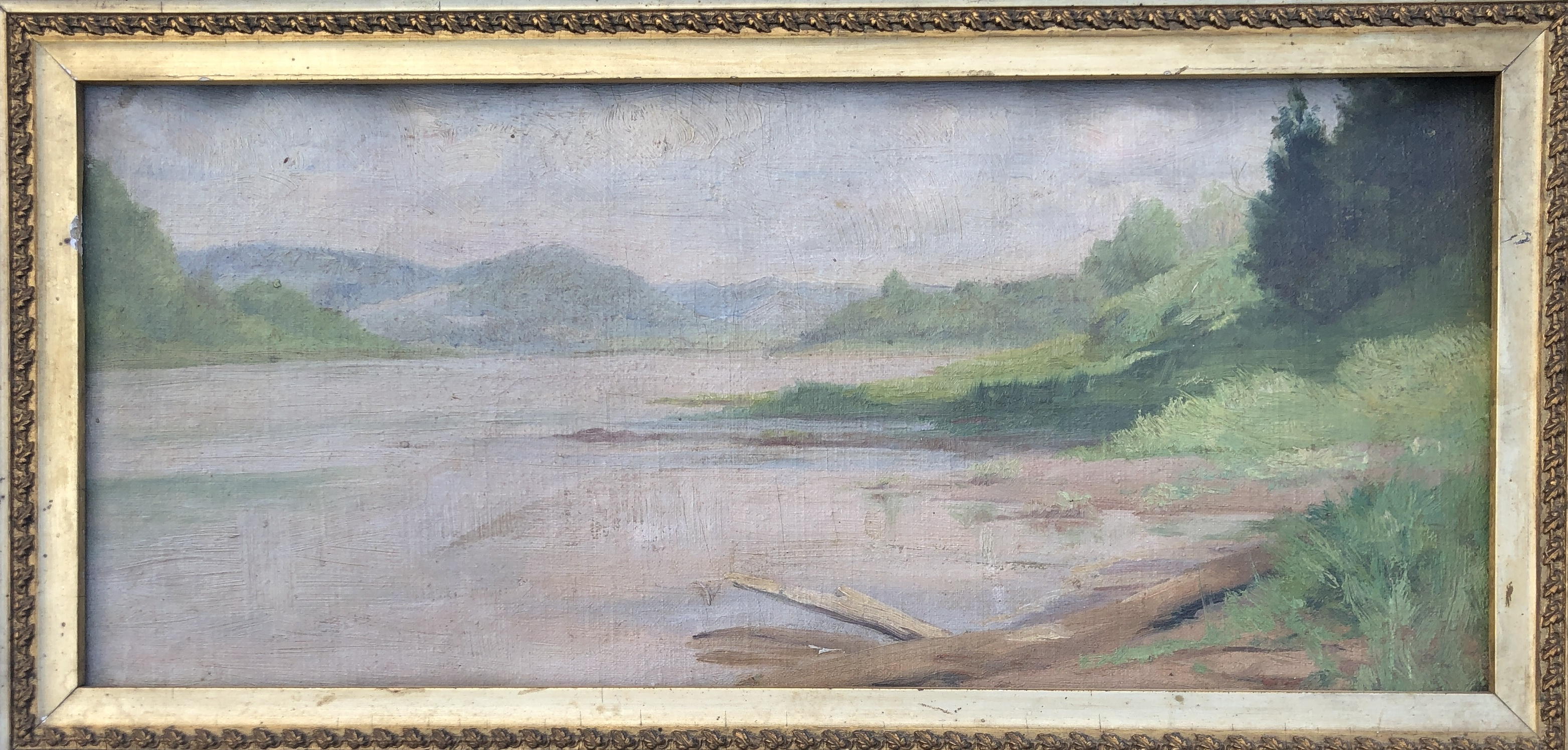
Oil painting of an Ohio River Landscape

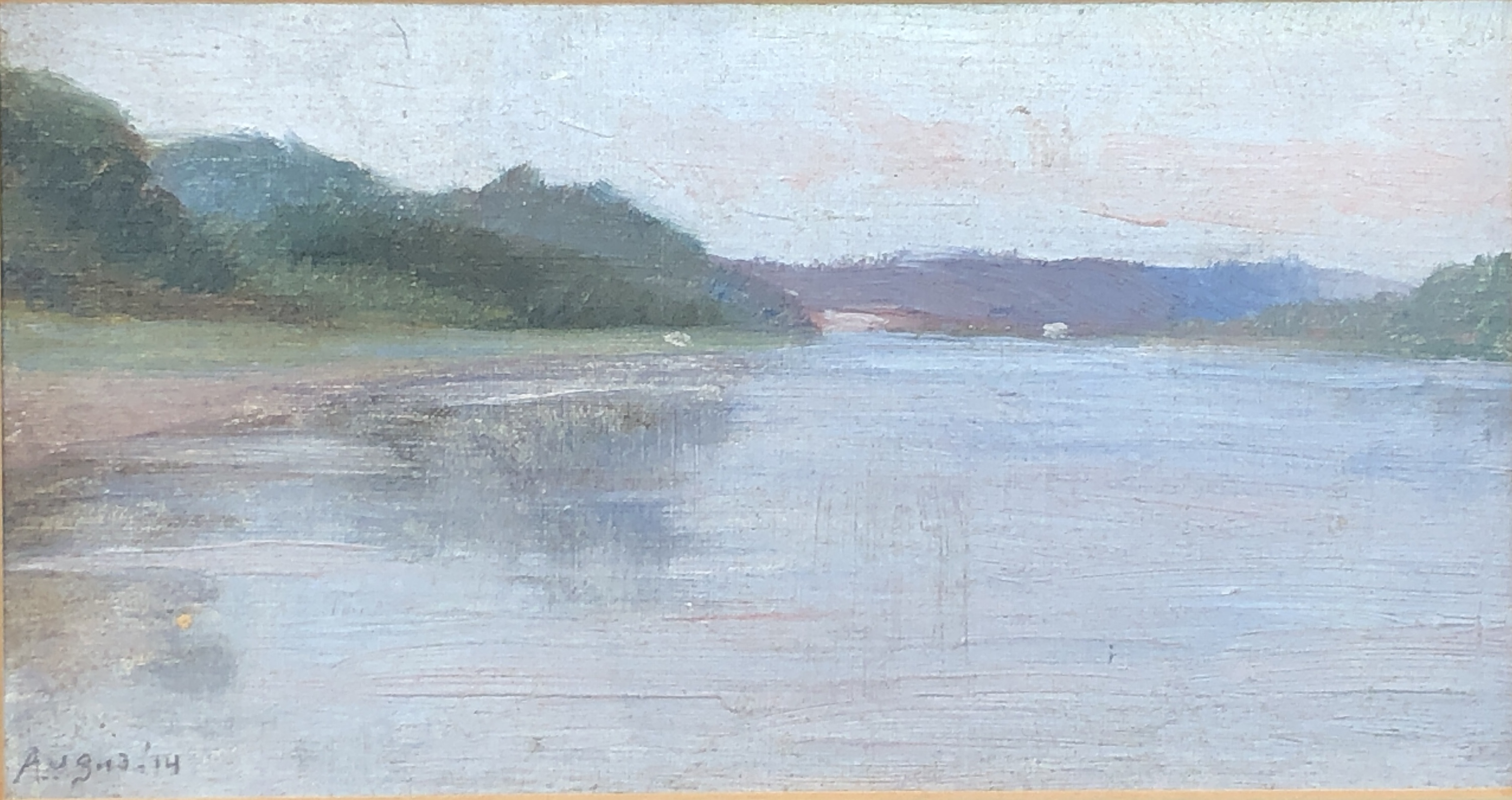
Oil painting of a landscape that is probably on the Ohio River

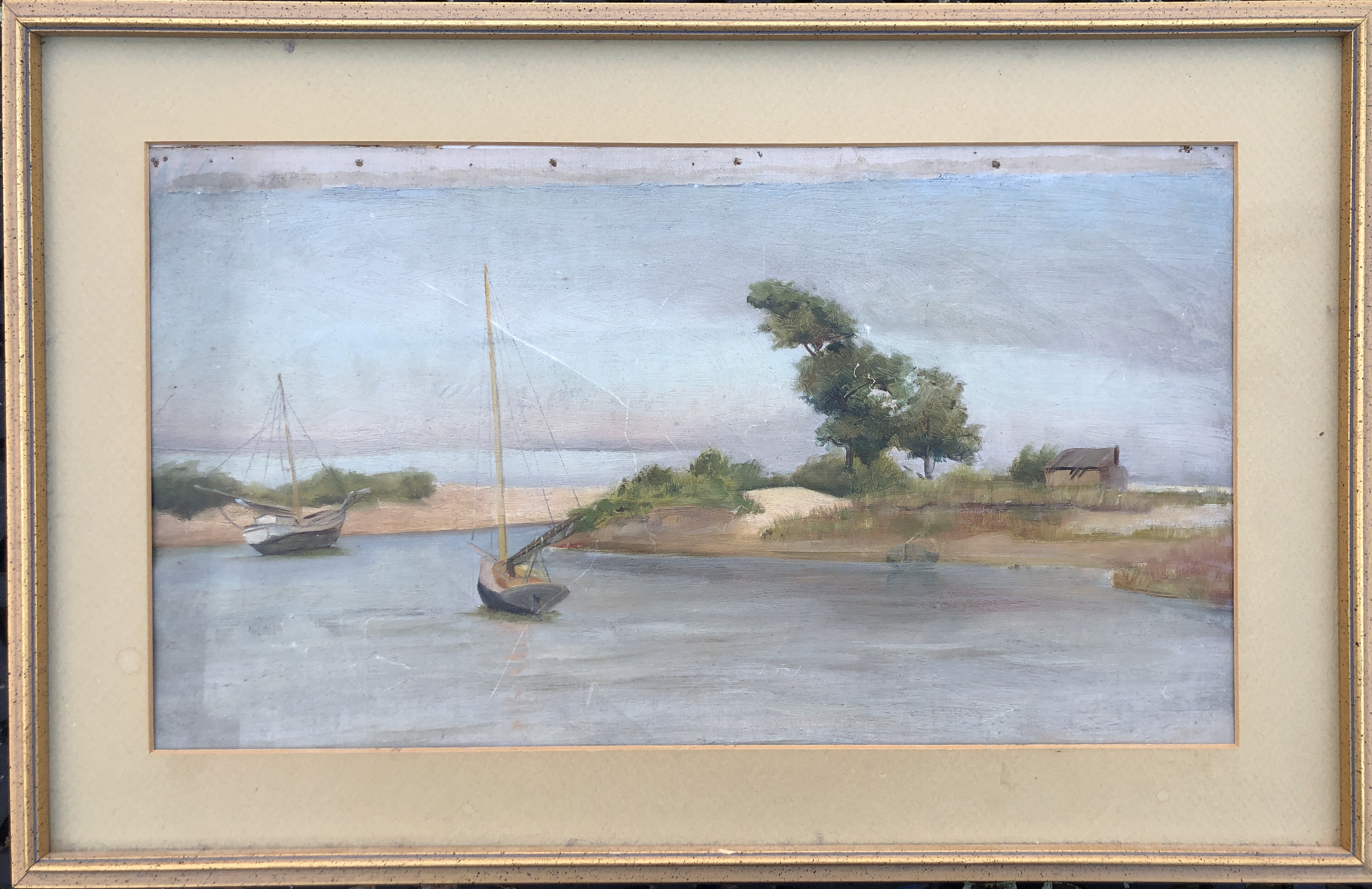
Oil painting of a shore landscape

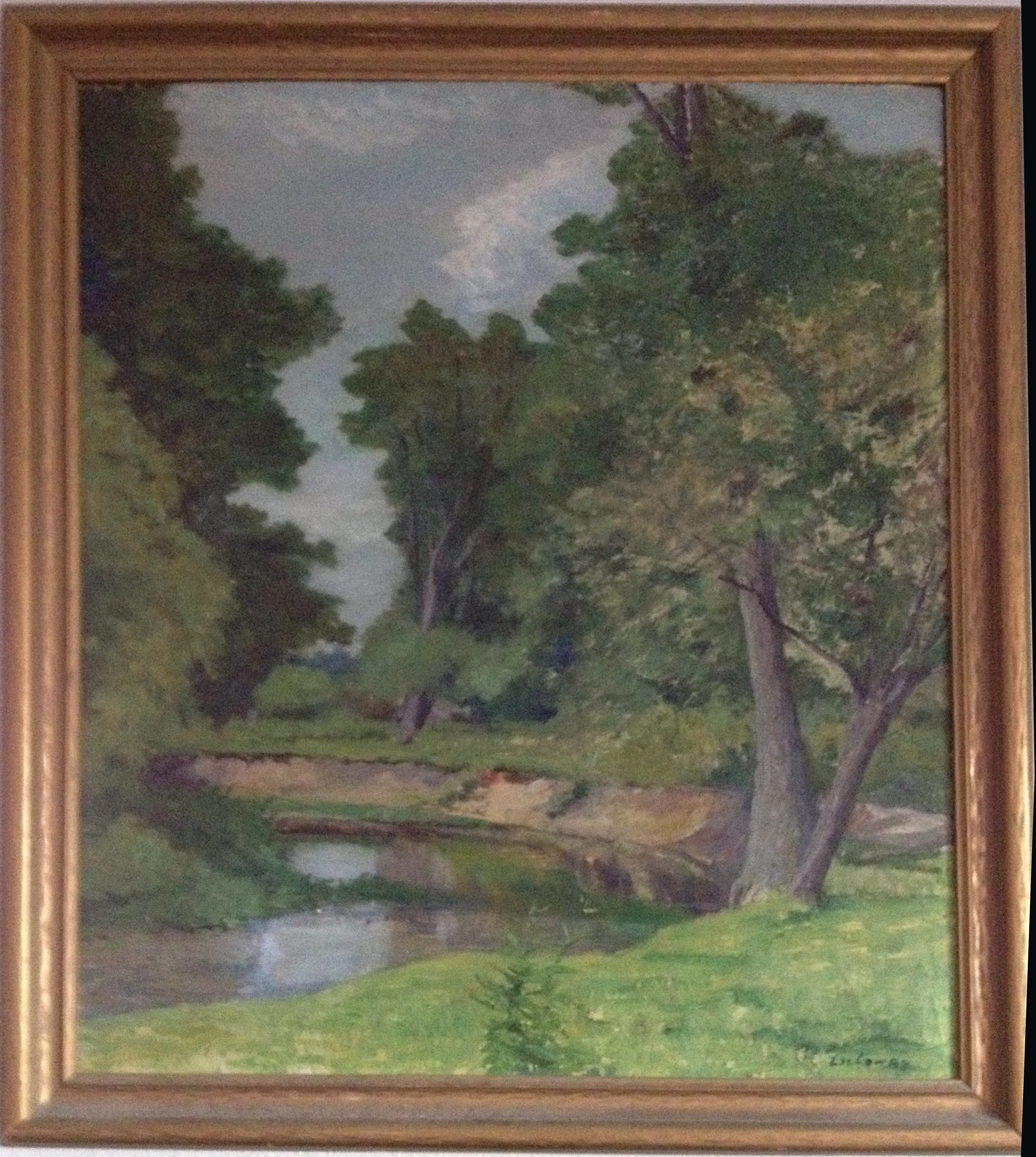
Oil painting of the swimming hole at the Porter Family Farm in Blissfield, MI

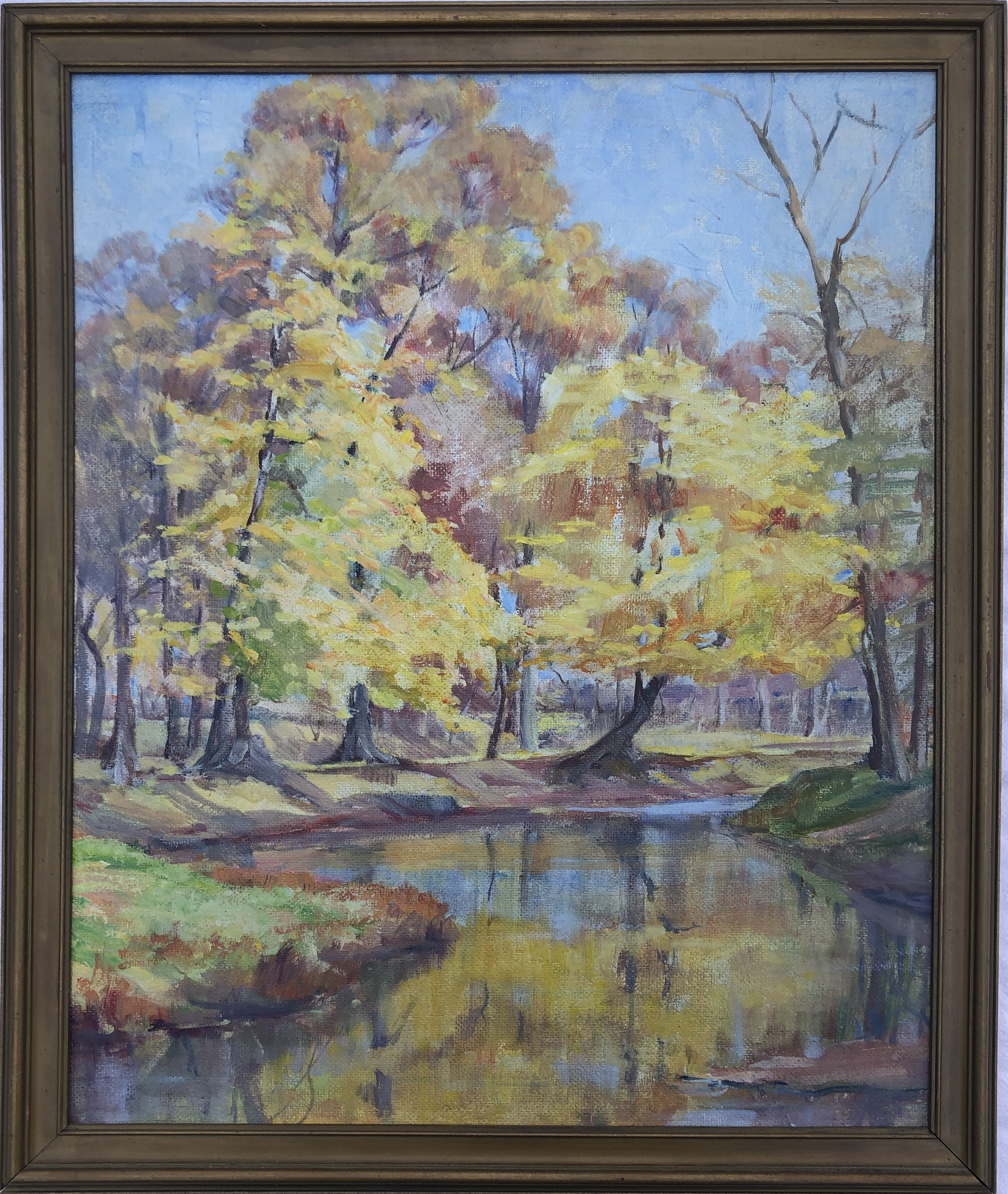
Oil painting of a view of the Raisin River at the Porter Farm, Blissfield, MI

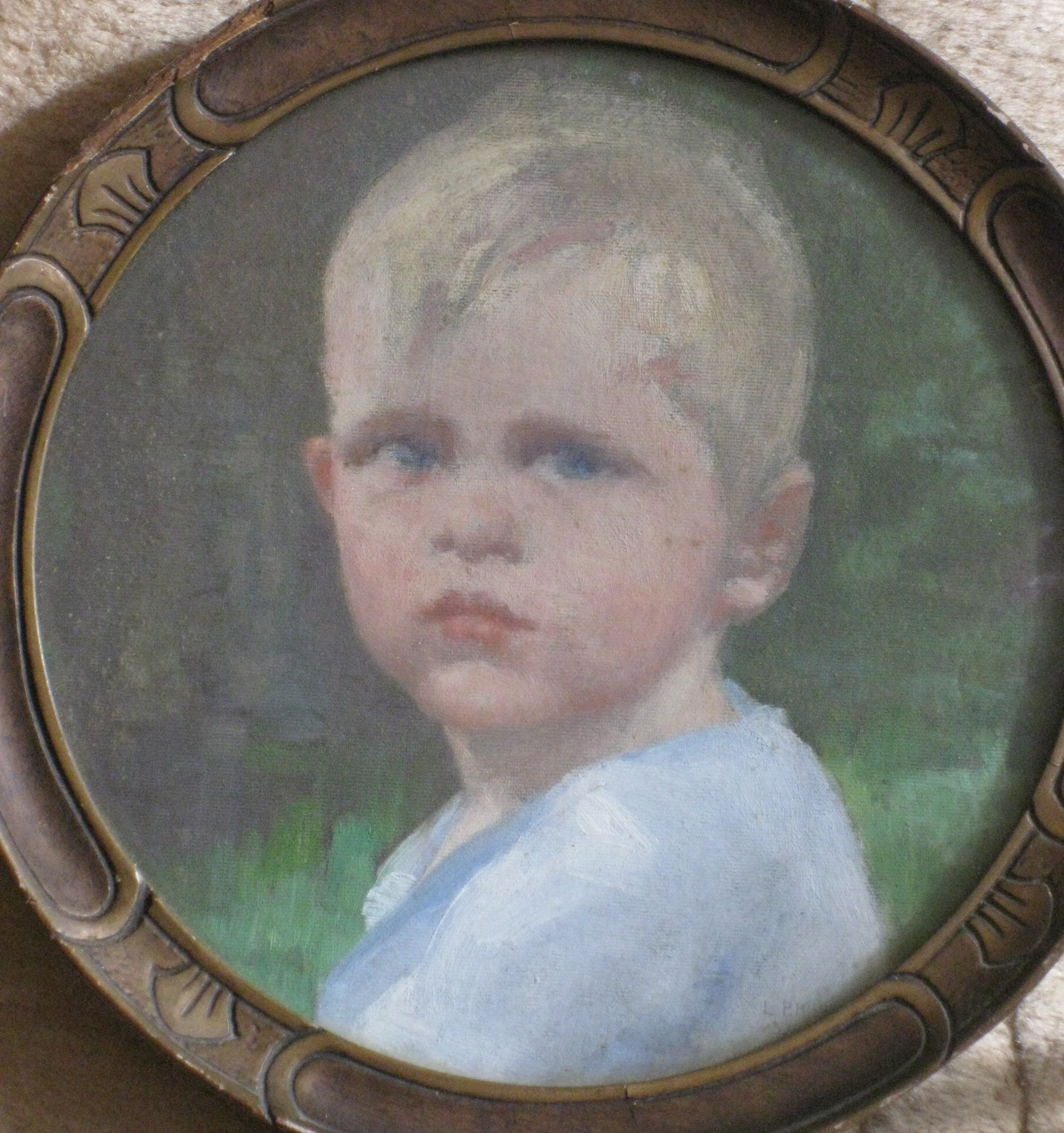
Portrait of Robert Erickson at 18 months in Blissfield, MI 1935

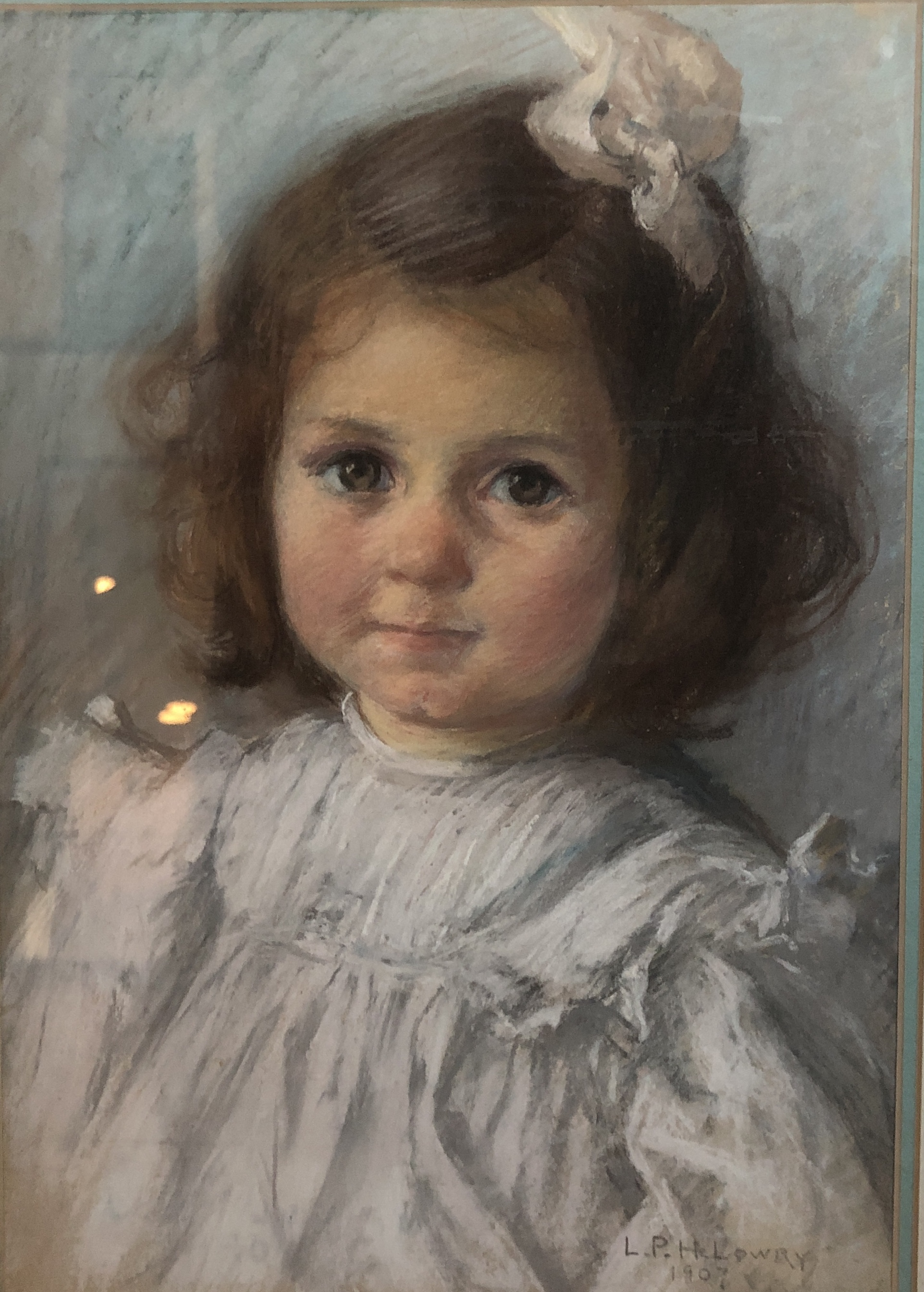
A portrait of Louise Talman Lowry (Thompson)

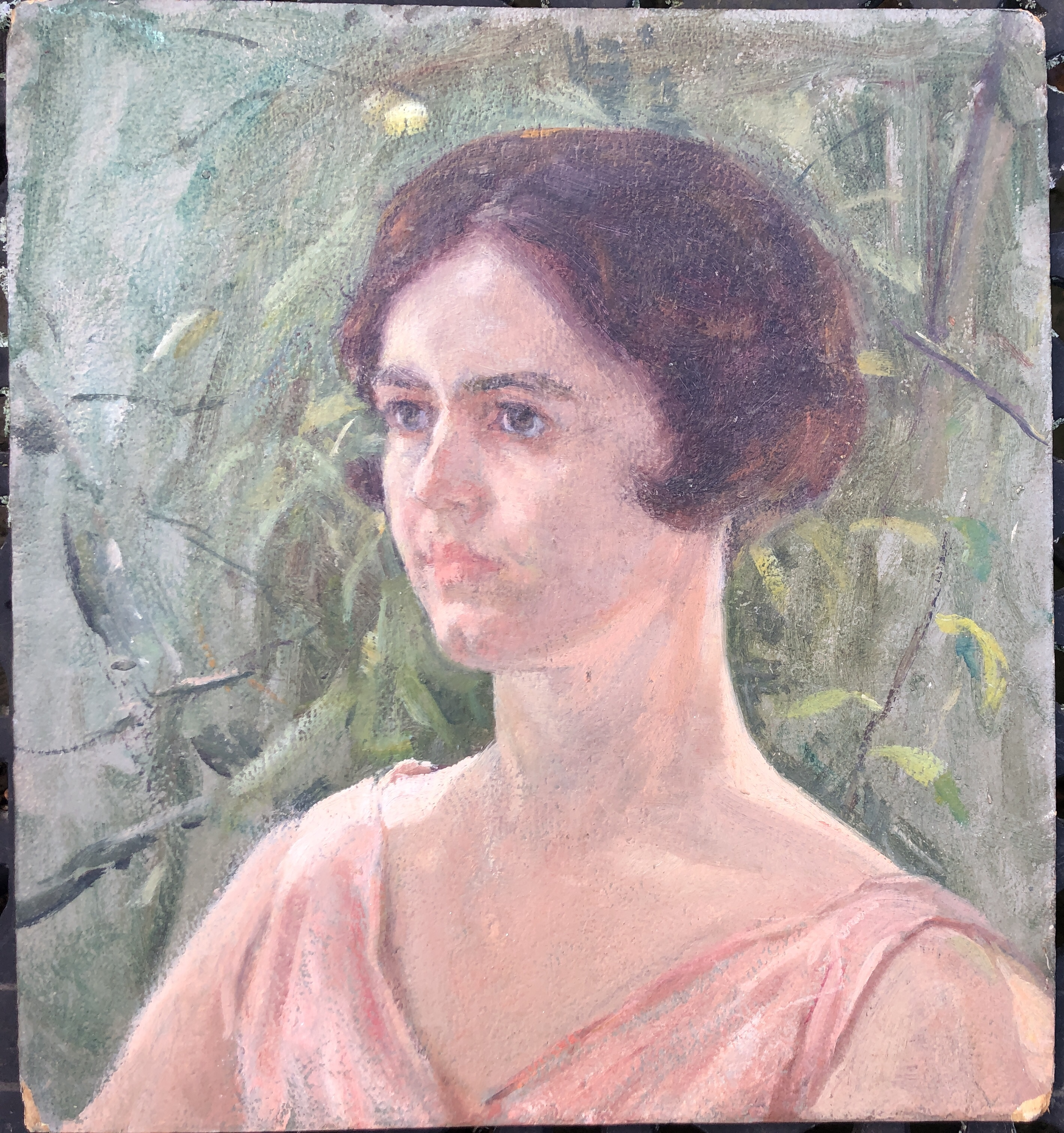
A portrait of Louise Talman Lowry (Thompson), likely a study for a larger portrait, now lost

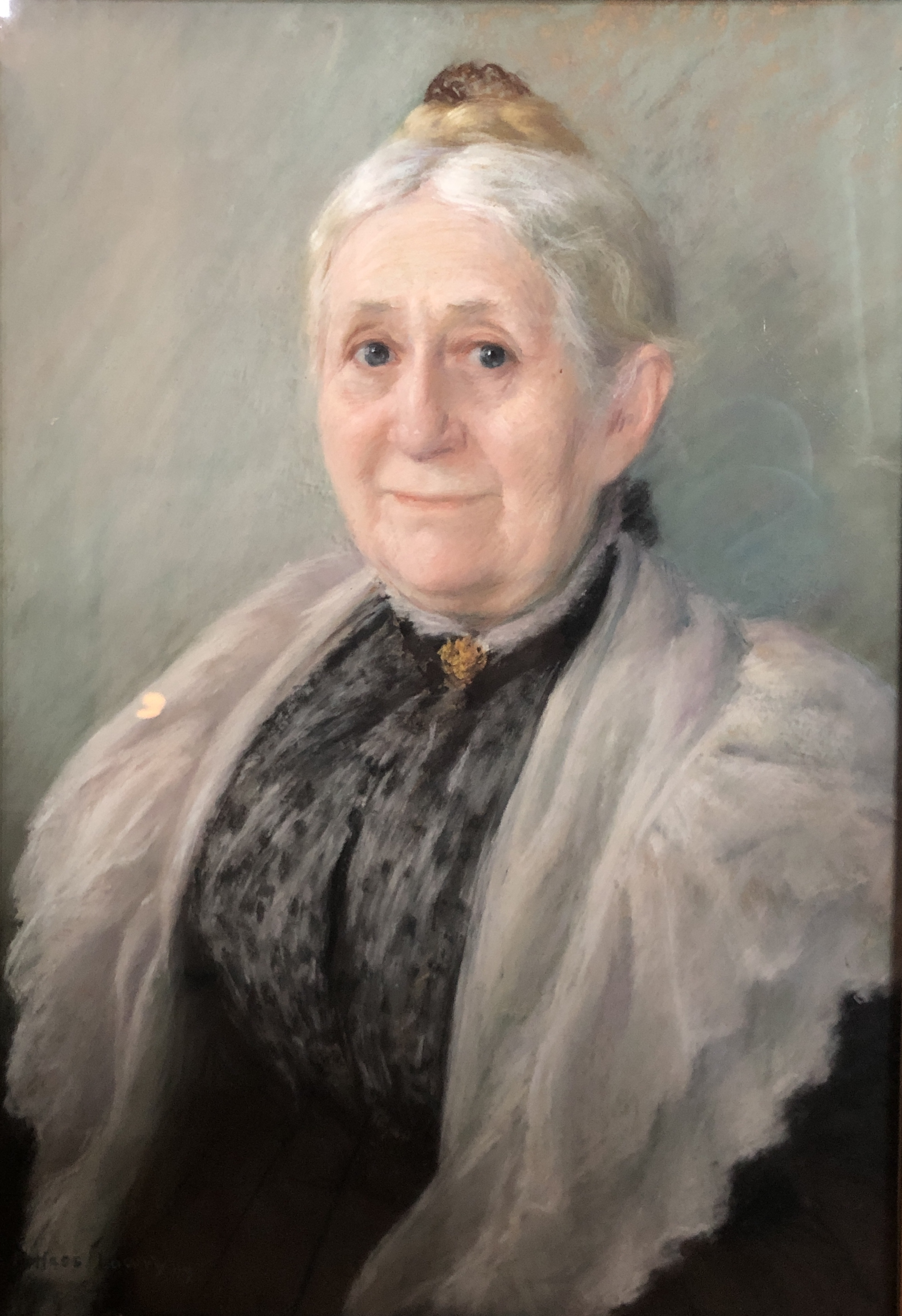
A portrait of Rebekah Goodrich Lowry (c. 1917)

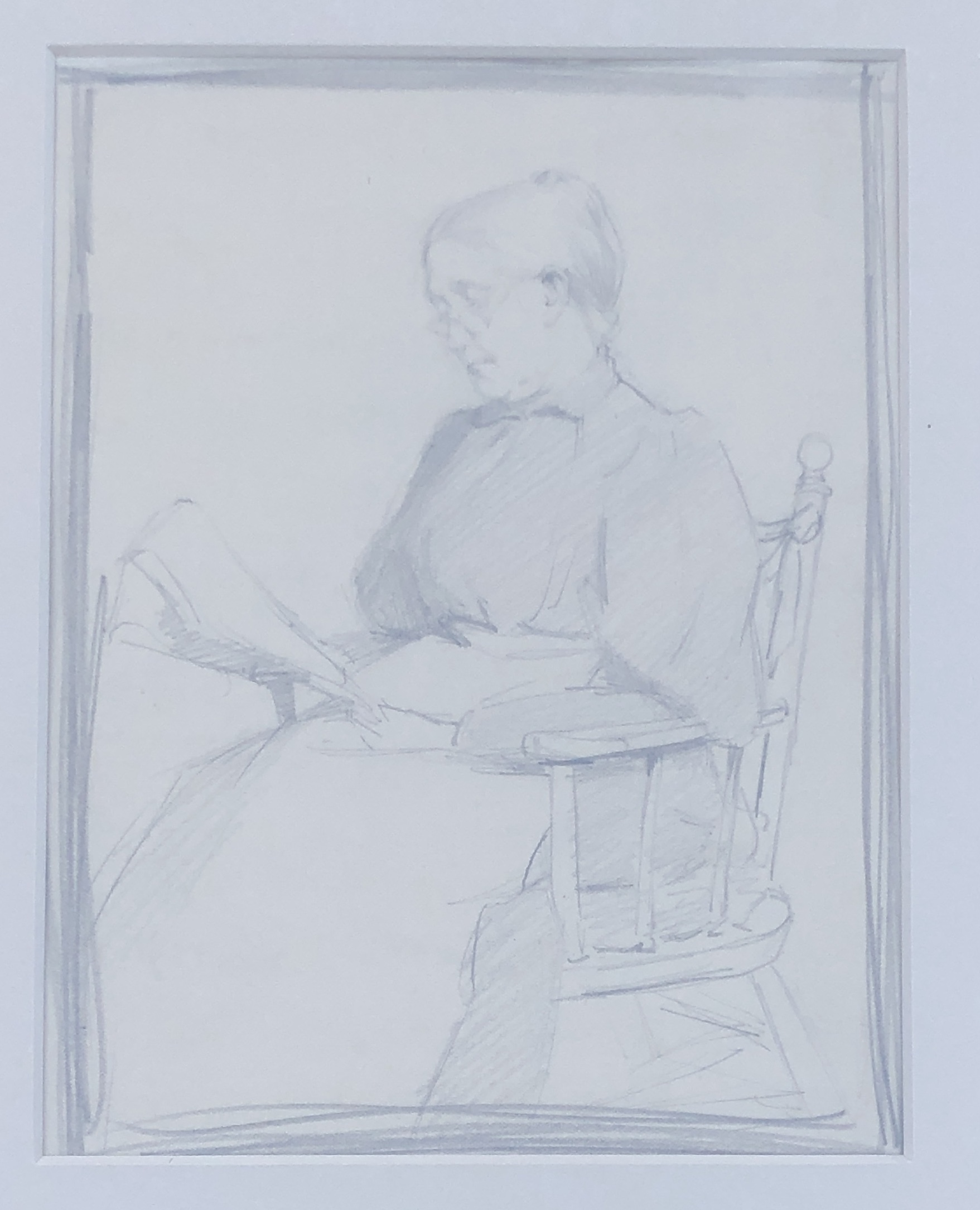
Pencil sketch of Rebekah Goodrich Lowry (c. 1917)

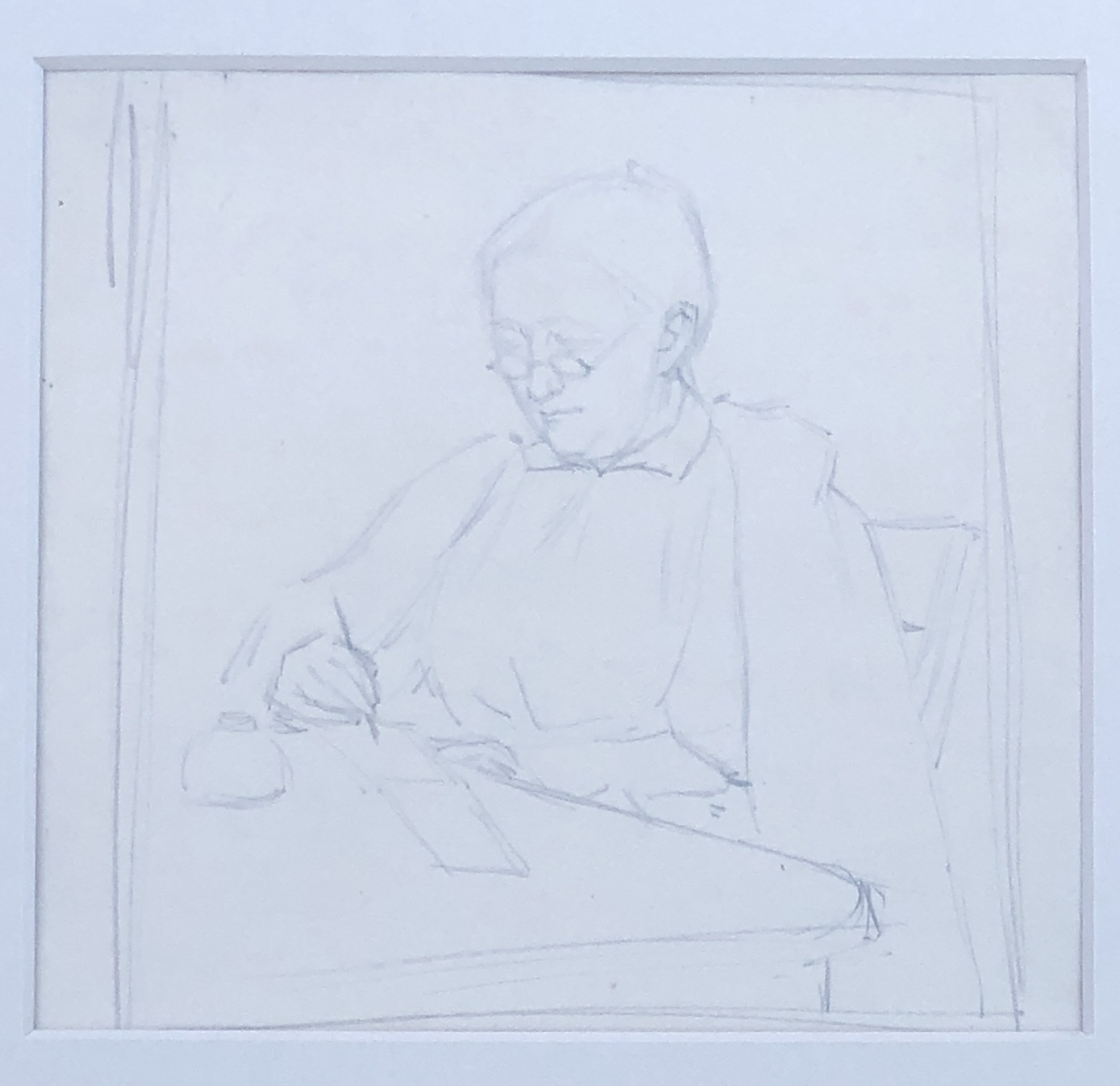
Pencil sketch of Rebekah Goodrich Lowry, (c. 1917)
