= Ancell Stronach =

Scottish artist

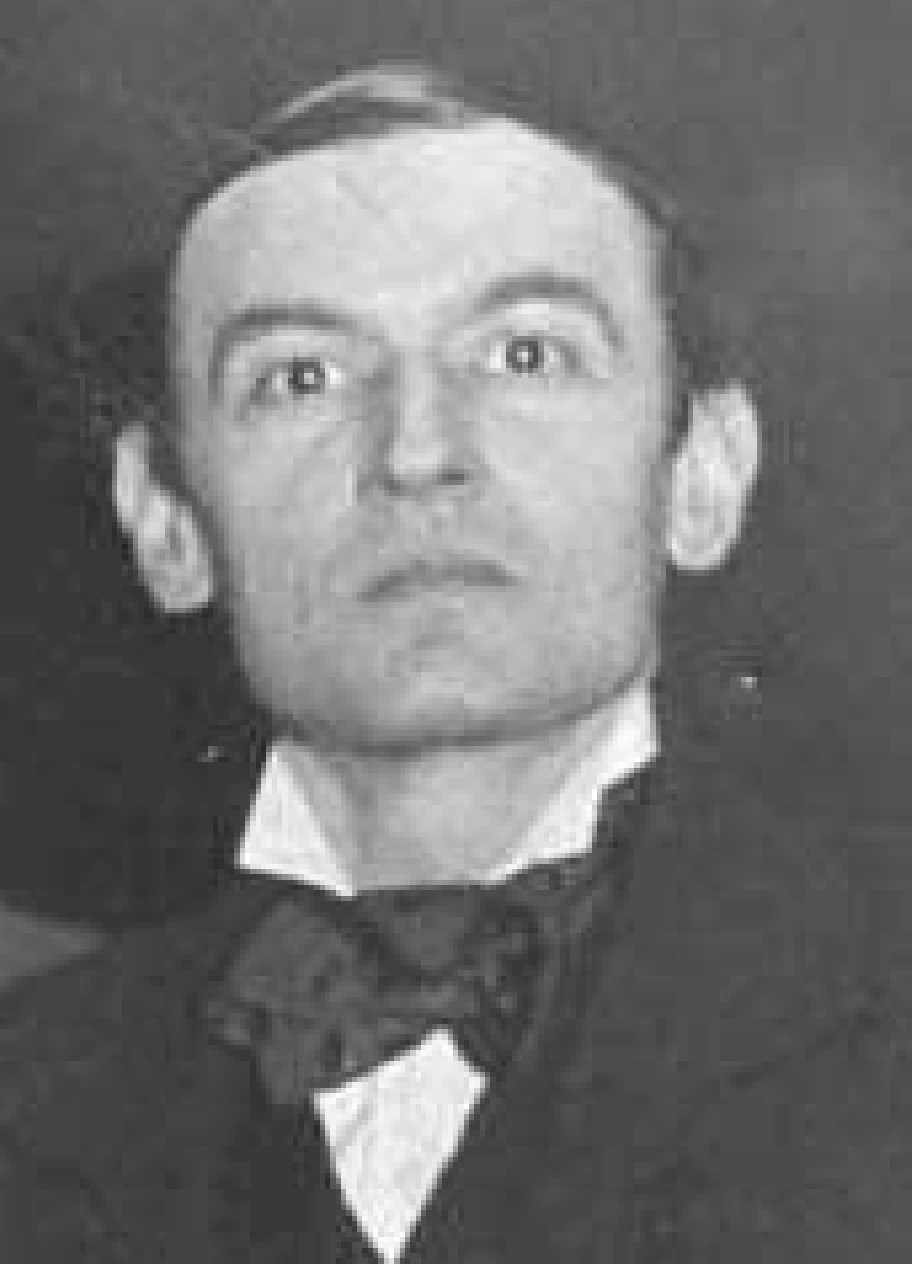
- Ancell Stronach (Portrait)
- Born: 1901
- Died: 1981 (aged 79–80)
- Known for: painting
- Awards: Guthrie Award, 1927

Ancell Stronach (1901–1981) was a Scottish artist born in Dundee.

Stronach was a member of the Royal Scottish Academy, elected in June 1934. He was winner of the Royal Scottish Academy Guthrie Award in April 1927. Stronach was initially a student and later became Professor of Mural Painting at the Glasgow School of Art.

A painter of portraits and figure subjects, among them 'The Annunciation', which draws on Domenico Ghirlandaio's fresco at the church of Santa Maria Novella in Florence, Stronach was strongly influenced by Sandro Botticelli, early Italian fresco painters and the Pre-Raphaelites, though his commitment to mural painting and stained glass design is also evident throughout his work. His chosen style and subject reflects the wider Celtic Revival movement prevalent in Scotland's arts scene at the time, and is visible in the work of other artists such as John Duncan (painter) and Phoebe Anna Traquair. Stronach exhibited at the Paris Salon, the Royal Scottish Academy, at the Royal Academy and in Canada, New Zealand and America. Seen as separated from the Celtic Revival, Stronach is today known to have been influenced by the work of Max Klinger, Mikhail Nesterov and Franz von Stuck, and come to be associated with symbolism.

About Glasgow in the mid twenties, Stronach had a most distinctive style of dress. He always wore a high-winged collar and black stock, such as Walter Scott is seen wearing in his portraits, a very waisted jacket, narrow black-and-white checked trousers and white spats.

He was also a mural and church decorator and stained glass designer. Later, disillusioned with the medium of paint and canvas, he tried his hand as a stage performer with Ancell and His 40 Painted Pigeons. He toured extensively with his wife, Gwendoline Eleanor Cunningham. At that time he kept Barbary Doves (the 'pigeons' of his act), several species of stick insect and also bred fancy mice. He continued to paint but gave away his paintings to friends and relatives. His work fell from favour during his later years, and he died in relative obscurity, in Kent, in 1981.

In a revival of interest, his painting 'Circe', of a nude, sold at Christie's in London for £13,750 in 2012 – and then sold again for £32,500 on 4 September 2014 as part of 'The Neil Wilson Collection: A Romantic Vision' (Sale 5928). In June 2021, his painting 'Where Sinks the Voice of Music into Silence' was sold at a Lyon and Turnbull Auction in Edinburgh for £57,500.

A portrait of Ancell Stronach painted by Andrew Law was lost in the fire in the Mackintosh Building at the Glasgow School of Art on 23 May 2014.

== Selected paintings ==
- Circe, 1925
- The Unexpected Meeting, 1927
- The Annunciation, 1924
- Where Sinks the Voice of Music into Silence, 1925
- Portrait of Peter Wylie Davidson, 1924
- A Visitation, 1922
