= Sarah Noble Ives =

American artist and writer

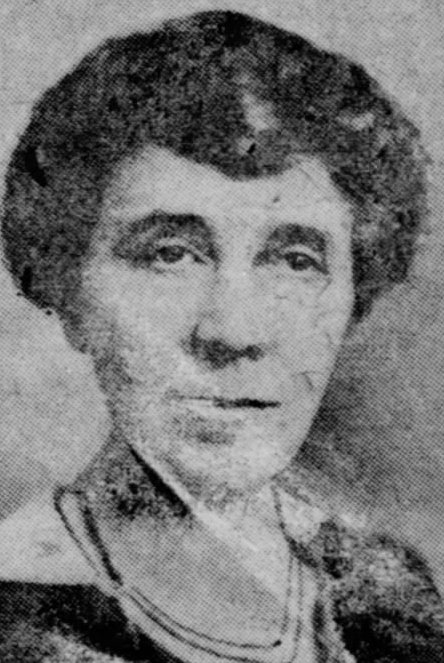
- Born: March 1864; Grosse Ile Township, Michigan
- Died: November 1944 (aged 80); Altadena, California
- Education: Académie Julian, Académie Delécluse
- Occupations: writer, illustrator, historian

Sarah Noble Ives (March 1864 – November 1944) was an American writer, illustrator, and historian known for her children's books including Dog Heroes of Many Lands and Songs of the Shining Way. Her work also appeared in publications like the New York Herald Tribune, the Boston Globe, and McClure's, sometimes under the name Noble Ives. Later in her life she researched and published a history of Altadena, California.

== Early life ==
Ives was born in Grosse Ile, Michigan, near Detroit, in March 1864, to S. William and Sarah Mana Hyde Ives. She attended Port Huron High School, where she first began studying art, and a Training School for Elocution and Literature run by Mrs. Edna Chafee Noble, who was a suffragette and a role model to Sarah. She continued her education first in New York City at the School for Artists and Artisans and then in Paris at the Académie Julian and Académie Delécluse. When she returned to the United States she began work as a freelance author and illustrator in New York under the name "Noble Ives", in line with other female artists of the time who hid their identity in various ways.

== Career ==
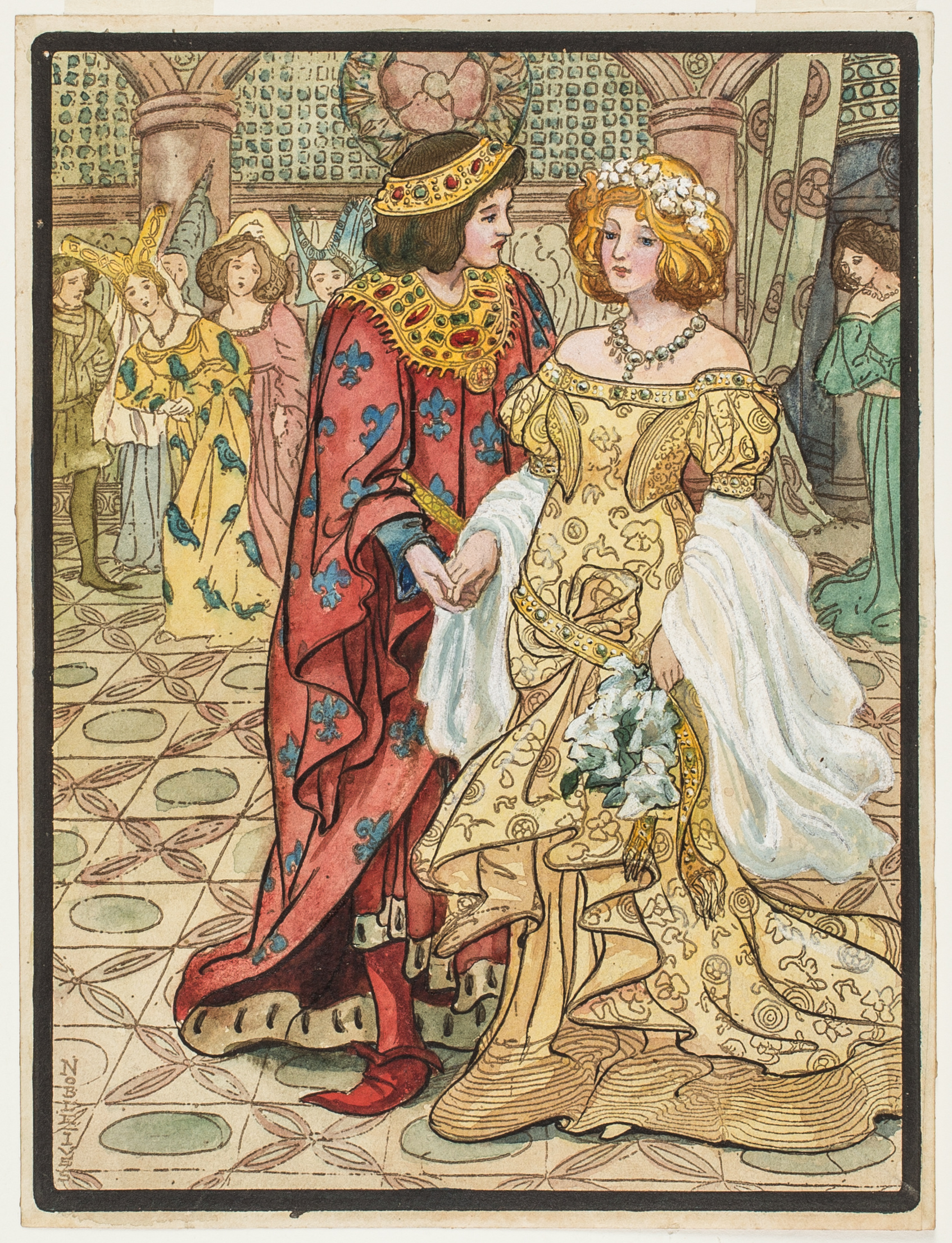
Watercolor illustration of Cinderella at the ball.

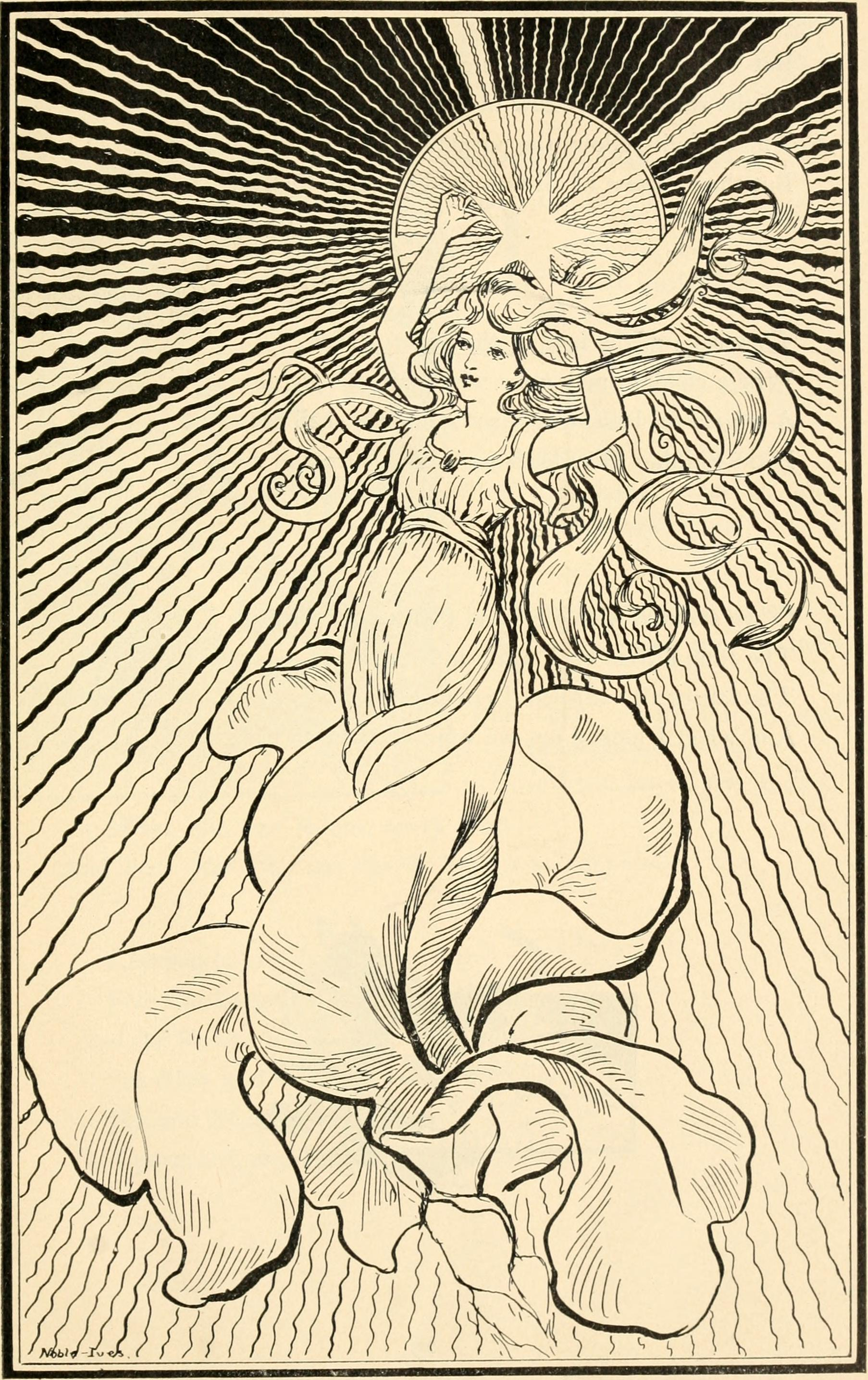
Illustration from Songs of the Shining Way, 1899

Ives specialized in descriptive illustrations with varied, distinct characters. Some of the pieces include decorative Art Nouveau elements and apparel. She was proficient in black and white pen and ink drawings as well as watercolors and oil painting.

=== Works for children ===
Songs of the Shining Way, written and illustrated by Ives, was published in 1899 and featured poems paired with black ink drawings. Ives dedicated the book to her mentor, Edna Chaffee Noble.

Many of Ives' illustrations feature animals, and several of her self-penned publications include them prominently. The Key to Betsy's Heart, in 1916 tells the story of a girl and her dog.

Ives created colorful illustrations for books like The Wonderful Story of Teddy the Bear, published by the McLoughlin Brothers, who often commissioned female artists. She also illustrated fairy tales and rhymes for them, including many popular illustrations for one of their editions of Mother Goose's Nursery Rhymes.

=== Landscapes ===
In addition to her freelance work illustrating, Ives also painted and exhibited landscapes for her own enjoyment. She said of these oil paintings, "To work in oils, that is what I love. The black and white [commercial illustration] is bread and butter work." She also experimented with early color photography.

== Later life ==
Ives lived and worked in New York for some time, then returned to Port Huron, Michigan in 1921. In 1925, she left Michigan and retired to Altadena, California, with her three sisters, Florence, Cayde and Julia. All four remained unmarried.

Ives was recruited by the local historical society to compile a history of the town, which was published in 1938 by the Star-News Publishing Company. A resident of the town remembered her as "a very lovely little old lady" who "trudged up and down the streets of Altadena ringing doorbells. ... Her house-to-house canvassing was not to sell books, but to gather information to write a book."

Ives died in November 1944. Her home in Altadena is now included on local historical tours. Original artwork by Ives can sometimes be found at auction, in private collections and on display in museum exhibits.

== Bibliography ==
=== Author and illustrator ===
- Songs of the Shining Way, 1899
- The Story of Teddy the Bear, 1907
- The Key to Betsy's Heart, 1916
- Dog Heroes of Many Lands, 1922

=== Illustrator ===
- Carey of St. Ursula's by Jane Brewster Reid, 1911
- Mother Stories by Maud Lindsay
