= Andrew Law (artist) =

British painter (1873-1967)

- Born: 1873; Crosshouse, Ayrshire
- Died: 1967 (aged 93–94)
- Education: Glasgow School of Art; Académie Delécluse
- Known for: Portrait painting

Andrew Law (1873–1967) was a Scottish artist and portrait painter. Law rarely exhibited outside of the west of Scotland, but, during a long career based on private commissions, he produced a significant body of work.

== Life and work ==
Law was born at Crosshouse in Ayrshire, where his father was a miner and later a publican. Law went to school in Kilmarnock and took evening classes at the Kilmarnock Academy. In 1891, he was awarded the National Medal for Success in Art and won a place at the Glasgow School of Art, where his tutor was Fra Newbery. In 1896, Law was awarded a travelling scholarship and spent six months studying in Paris, where he took lessons from Robert Henri and attended classes at the Académie Delécluse. Law returned to Kilmarnock and began a successful career accepting private portrait commissions.

Law married Elizabeth Wilson in 1912, and the couple moved to Glasgow, where Law continued with his commissioned work. Among these commissions was the full-length portrait of the footballer Alan Morton, which still hangs in the Ibrox Stadium. Law was active in the Glasgow Art Club and also taught part-time at the Glasgow School of Art until his retirement in 1938. Law exhibited regularly at the Royal Scottish Academy, at the Glasgow Institute of Fine Art and at the Paris Salon. His only one-man show was in 1958, and in later life, he continued to paint rural and street scenes around Kilmarnock.

A portrait painted by Law of his fellow Scot and artist Ancell Stronach was lost in the fire in the Mackintosh Building at the Glasgow School of Art on 23 May 2014.
