= Eugène Delécluse =

French painter

- Born: 5 August 1882; Paris, France
- Died: 5 October 1972 (aged 90)
- Occupation: Painter

Eugène Delécluse (5 August 1882 – 5 October 1972) was a French painter. His work was part of the painting event in the art competition at the 1928 Summer Olympics.

== Biography ==
A student of Fernand Cormon, Paul-Louis Delance, Étienne-Jean Delécluze, Émile Renard and Charles Albert Waltner, he exhibited at the Salon des Artistes Français from 1903 to 1914, then at the National Society of Fine Arts. In 1913, he obtained an honorable mention as an engraver.

During the First World War, sent to Salonika with the army of the East, he made several drawings for the newspaper L'Illustration. Delécluse died in Villiers-le-Bel on 5 October 1972.
