= Edward Frederick Ertz =

English painter

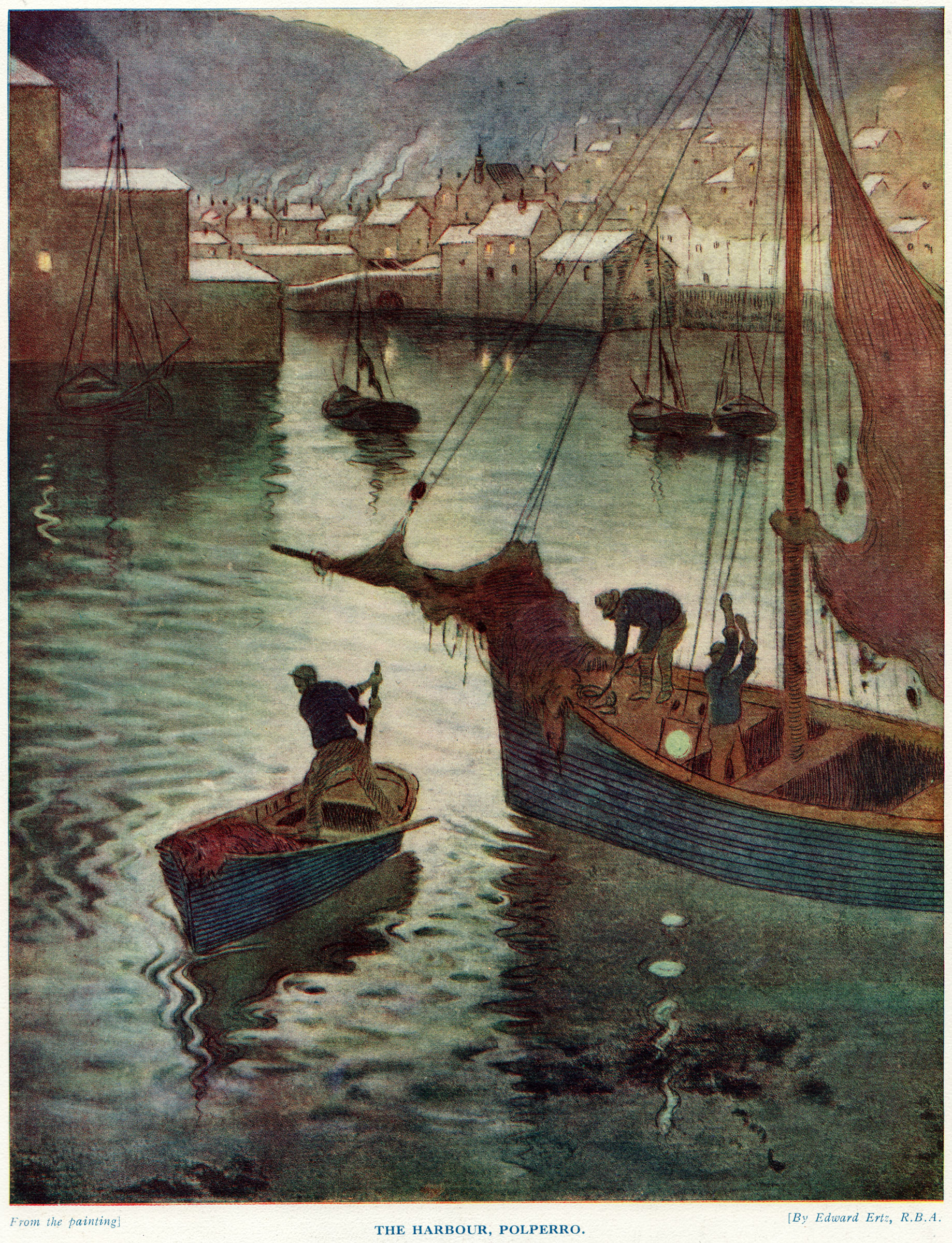
The Harbour, Polperro, Cornwall, by Edward Ertz. A full-page colour plate from: "Britain Beautiful". 4 vols. London: Hutchinson, 1924–26.

Edward Frederick Ertz (born 1 March 1862 in Canfield, Illinois, died 1954 in Pulborough, England) was an artist and fellow of the Royal Society of Arts. He was also an etcher and wood engraver, and an early member of the Society of Graphic Art.

He first worked in New Orleans and then New York, and showed work at the 1893 World's Fair. He went to Paris to train as a painter, exhibiting in the Paris salons from 1889. From 1892 to 1899 he was a professor of watercolour-painting and drawing at the Académie Delécluse in Paris. In 1899 or 1900 Ertz settled in the south of England, where he made paintings that were shown nationally and internationally. He kept a studio at Pulborough, Sussex, and taught at Kings Langley in Hertfordshire. He also produced coloured 'xylographie' (or 'xylographic') woodcut prints.

He is now remembered largely for his harbour and coastal scenes, and his early work in the American West.
