= Auguste Joseph Delécluse =

French painter and educator

- Born: April 23, 1855; Roubaix, France
- Died: December 13, 1928 (aged 73); Paris, France
- Known for: painting, education

Auguste Joseph Delécluse (1855–1928) was a French painter and educator, known for his still life and portraiture paintings. He founded the Académie Delécluse.

== Biography ==
Auguste Joseph Delécluse was born 23 April 1855 in Roubaix, France. He studied with Jean-Joseph Weerts, Carolus-Duran, and Paul-Louis Delance. Delécluse first participated in the Salon in 1880. The Académie Delécluse was an atelier-style art school in Paris founded by Auguste Joseph Delécluse in the late 19th century.

Delécluse died on 13 December 1928 in Paris.
