= Académie Delécluse =

Former art school in Paris, France

Location
- 84 Rue Notre Dame des Champs, Paris, France
- Coordinates: 48.84165810436894°N 2.332252756363852°E

Information
- Other name: Academie Delecluse
- School type: art school
- Established: late 19th century
- Founder: Auguste Joseph Delécluse

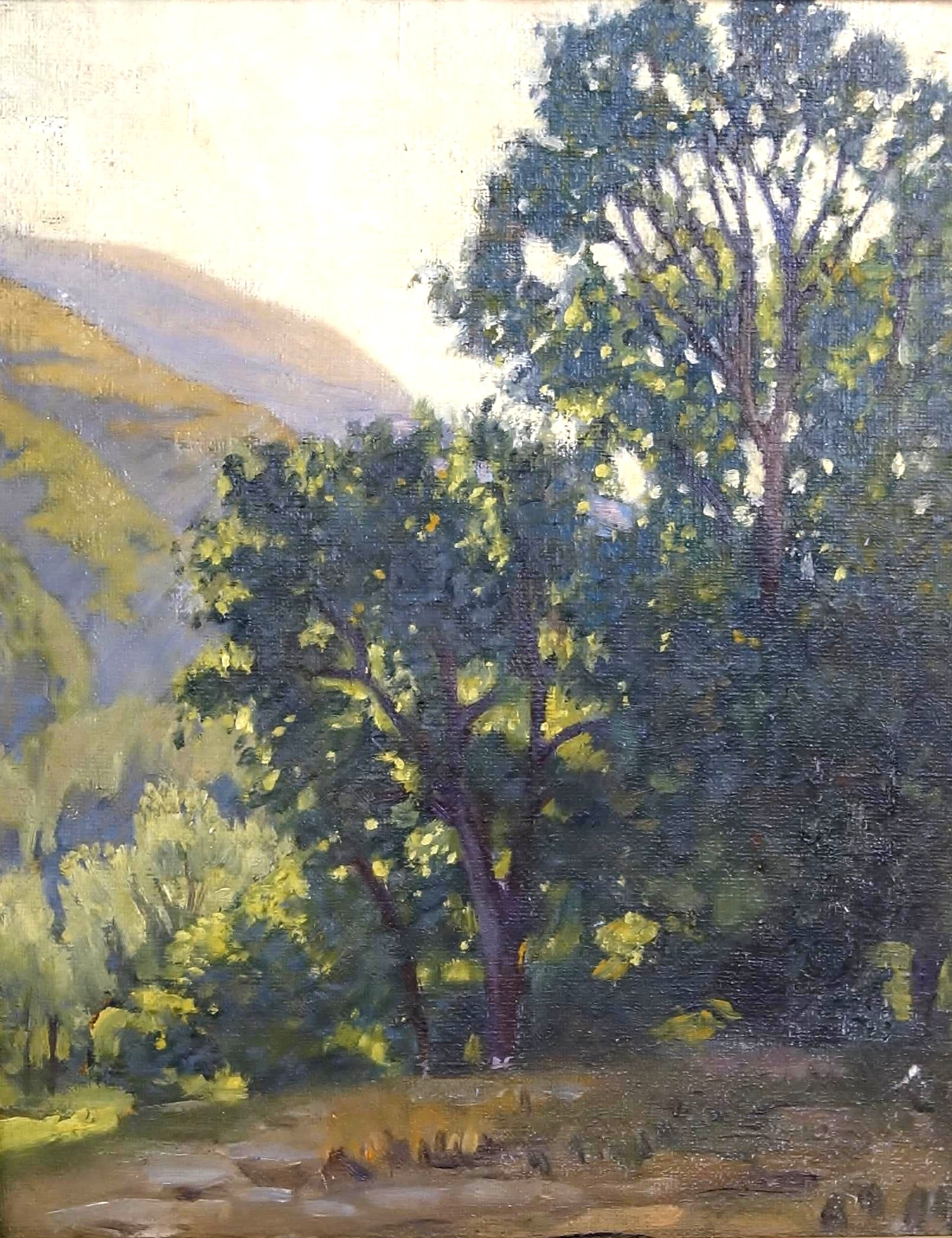
Channel Pickering Townsley painting, 1919, Académie Delécluse alumni

The Académie Delécluse was an atelier-style art school in Paris, France, founded in the late 19th century by the painter Auguste Joseph Delécluse. It was exceptionally supportive of women artists, with more space being given to women students than to men.

== History ==
The academy was founded by the French painter Auguste Joseph Delécluse in the late 19th century, and seems to have been in business starting in either 1884 or 1888.

The school moved locations several times before establishing a permanent location in Montparnasse on the 84 Rue Notre Dame des Champs. Like the Académie Julian, Académie Colarossi, and Académie Vitti, this school accepted women students. Men and women were trained separately, and it had two studios for women and only one for men. This proved to be particularly popular among English American and Australian women artists. During its heyday, it was one of the four best-known ateliers in Paris, but its influence and ability to attract good students waned in the early 20th century.

The main professors were Georges Callot, Paul-Louis Delance, and Auguste Joseph Delécluse himself. Edward Frederick Ertz (from 1892 to 1899) was also part of the faculty, teaching watercolor.

== Notable alumni ==
Notable students included:

- Gertrude Partington Albright;
- Florence Carlyle;
- Nathaniel Choate;
- Alson S. Clark;
- Colin Campbell Cooper;
- Emma Lampert Cooper;
- Jenny Eakin Delony;
- Simon Elwes;
- Dumitru Ghiață;
- Agnes Goodsir;
- Harold Harvey;
- Lydia Purdy Hess;
- Julia Beatrice How;
- Sarah Noble Ives;
- Alice Sarah Kinkead;
- Andrew Law;
- Blanche Lazzell;
- Harry Leith-Ross;
- Anna Lownes;
- Cedric Morris;
- Hilda Rix Nicholas;
- Roland Hinton Perry;
- Channel Pickering Townsley;
- Edith Somerville;
- Svend Rasmussen Svendsen;
- Ida Waugh
- Mahonri Young
- Inez Abbott
