= Mary Kollock =

American painter (1832–1911)

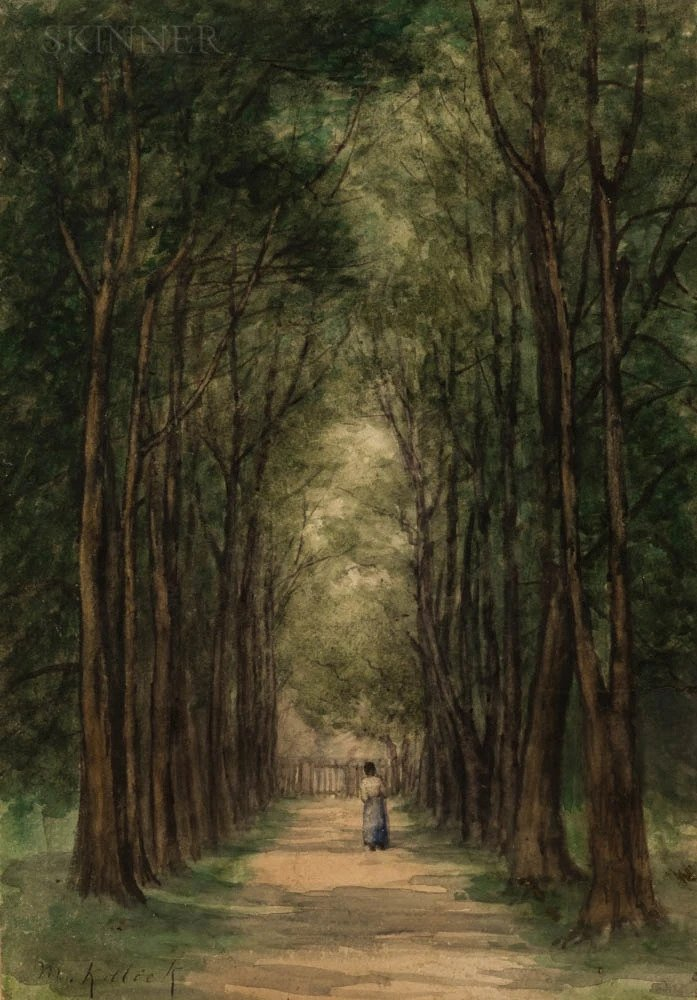
- Woman on an Allée by Kollock
- Born: August 20, 1832; Norfolk
- Died: January 12, 1911 (aged 78); New York City
- Occupation: Painter, artist
- Parent(s): Shepard Kosciuszko Kollock

Mary Kollock (August 20, 1832 – January 12, 1911) was an American landscape painter.

Mary Kollock was born on August 20, 1832 in Norfolk, Virginia, the daughter of Rev. Shepard Kosciuszko Kollock and Sarah Harris Kollock.

She studied art at the Philadelphia Academy of Fine Arts under Robert Wylie, then moved to New York City and studied at the National Academy of Design and the Art Students' League and under John B. Bristol and A. H. Wyant. She went to Paris and studied at the Académie Julian, then opened a studio there and studied under Paul-Louis Delance, Callot, and Lewis Deschamps. From 1895 to 1897, she was head of the art department at St. Helen's Hall, a school in Portland, Oregon. She exhibited her work regularly, including at the Centennial Exposition.

Mary Kollock died on 12 January 1911 in New York City.
