= Anna Sahlstén =

Finnish painter (1859–1931)

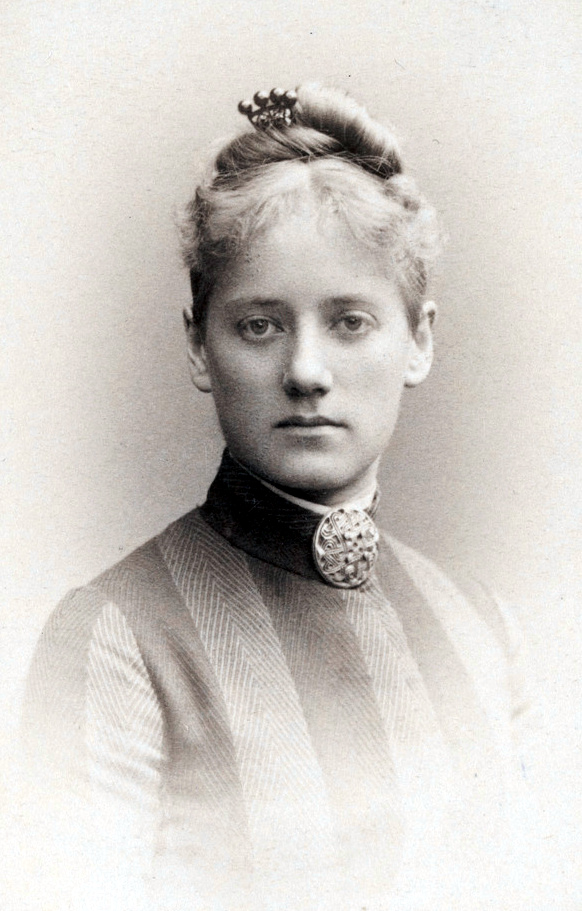
- Sahlstén in the late 19th century
- Born: Anna Sofia Sahlstén; 22 September 1859; Iisalmi, Grand Duchy of Finland, Russian Empire
- Died: 21 August 1931 (aged 71); Helsinki, Finland
- Known for: Painter

Anna Sofia Sahlstén (22 September 1859, Iisalmi – 21 August 1931, Helsinki) was a Finnish painter; primarily known for portraits and genre scenes.

== Biography ==
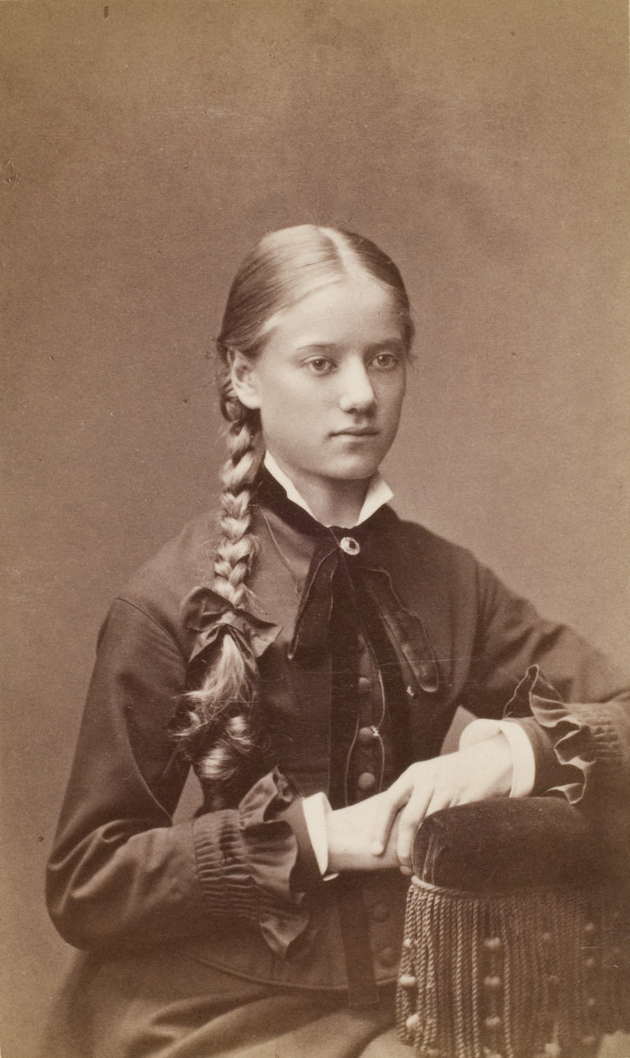
Young Sahlstén in 1877–78

Her father, Clas Vilhelm Sahlstén (1826–1897), was a Chamber Counselor who later became a writer. Her mother was Edla Elisabeth Heinricius. When she was eight, her family moved to Helsinki, where she attended a Swedish girls' school; receiving her certificate in 1877. She then studied at the Finnish Society Drawing School from 1877 to 1880, then at a private school operated by Adolf von Becker, from 1880 to 1882.

She went to Paris in 1884, where she studied at the Académie Colarossi, from 1884 to 1885 and after getting a new stipend again in 1889–1890. Her teachers there included Gustave-Claude-Etienne Courtois, Paul-Louis Delance and Jean-André Rixens. During a study trip in 1896, she visited Berlin and St. Petersburg.

She began teaching at the age of twenty-one and worked as a secondary school drawing teacher from 1882 to 1926. She co-founded the Finnish Teachers' Drawing Association in 1906 and acted its first president 1906–1926. She also started the association's own magazine, Stylus.

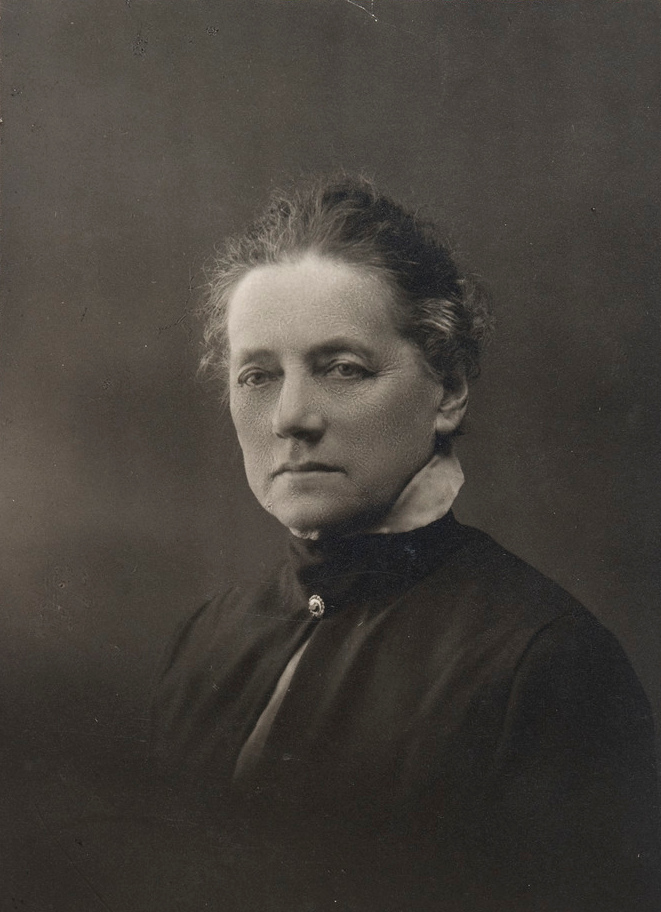
Sahlstén in 1923

After she retired from teaching, she wrote a two-act for children called Paimen-Pertti ja prinsessa Priscilla. She also developed a program to help children get food at school. In 1929, she worked on religious paintings at the church in Leppävaara.

Most of her works are folk scenes of people at work, in church or in their home. She later incorporated humorous elements into her work. Her paintings of coffee-drinking grandmothers have been used by the Paulig company, on a brand of coffee named after her.

== Selected works ==
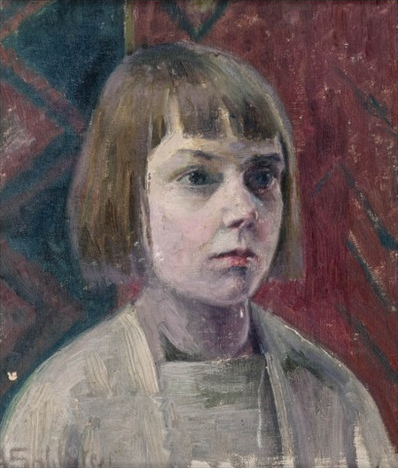
Young Girl

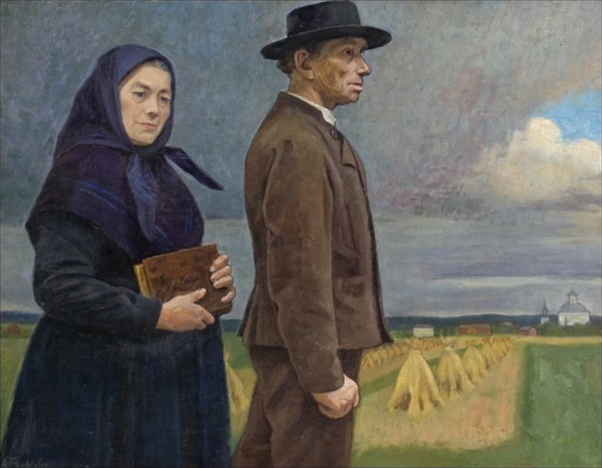
On the Way to Church, 1892

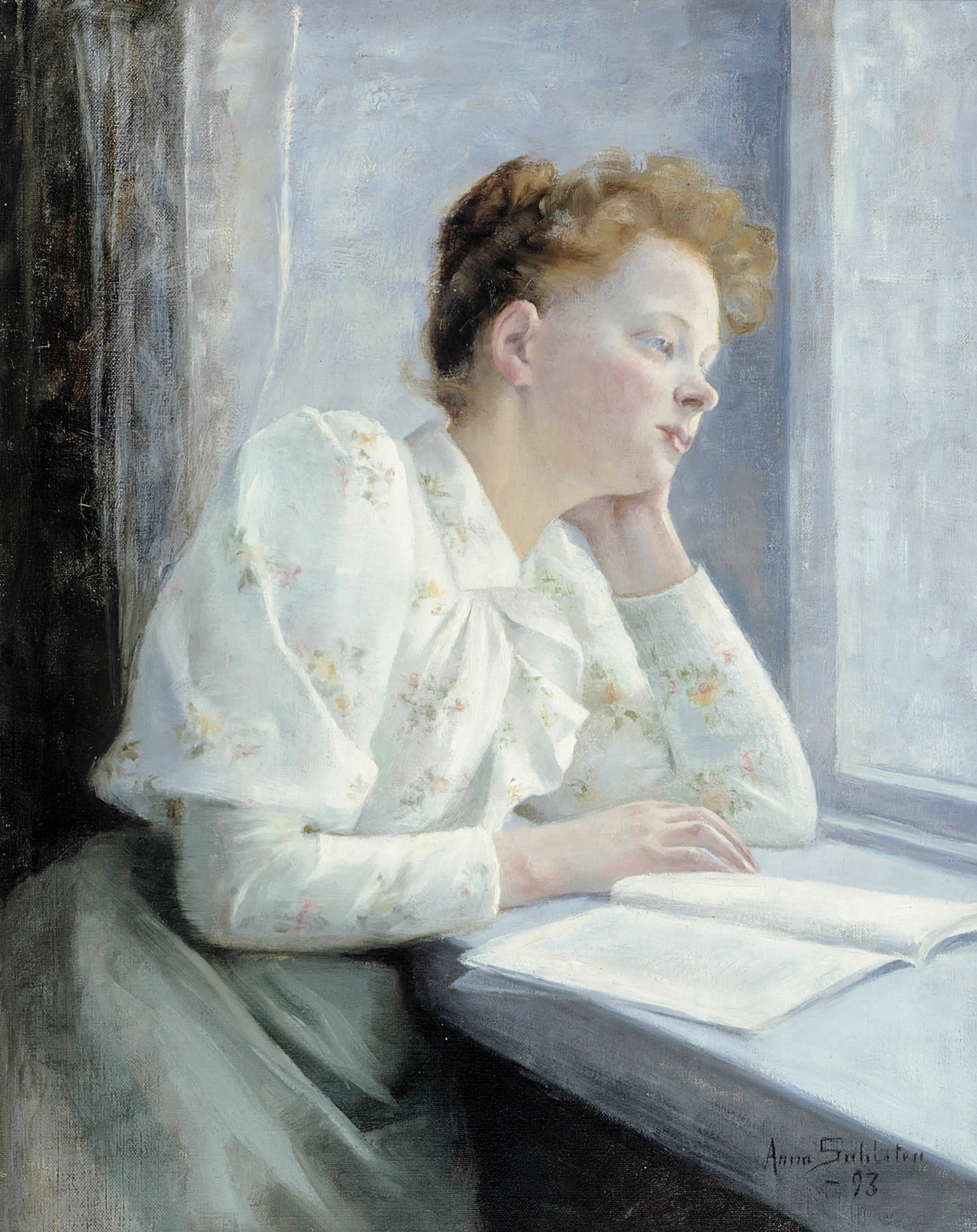
Woman by the Window, 1893

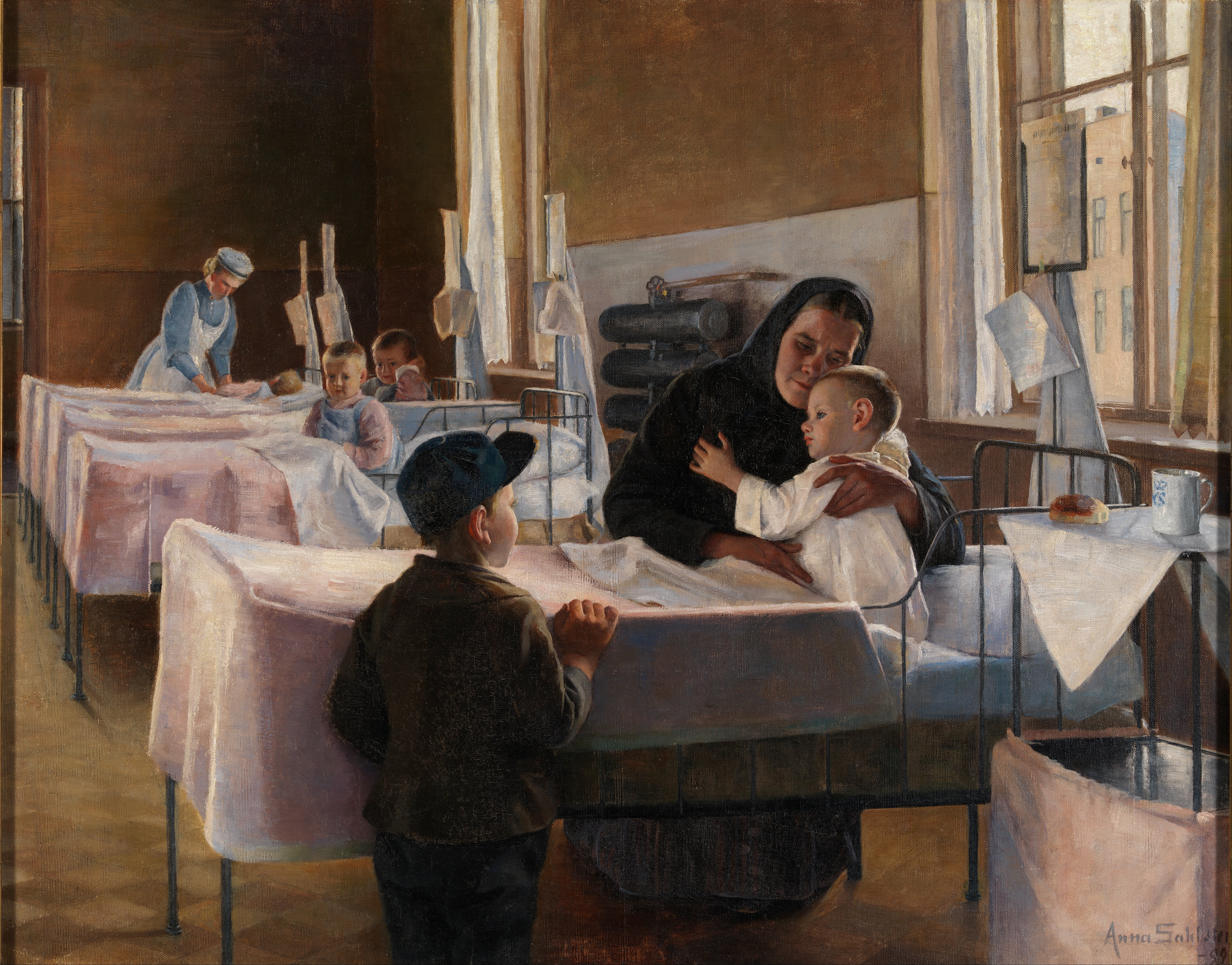
In the Hospital for Surgery, c. 1893

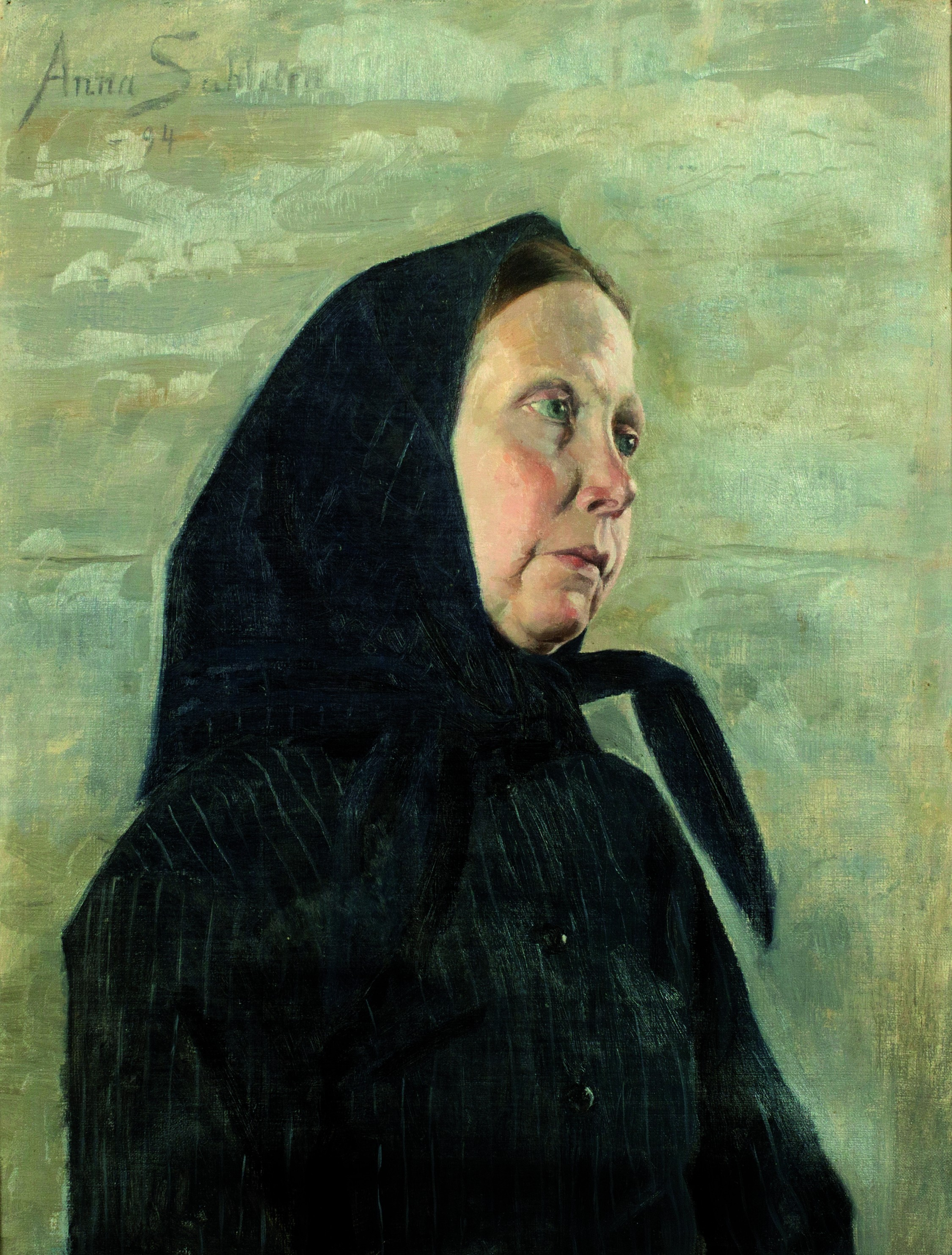
Woman, 1894

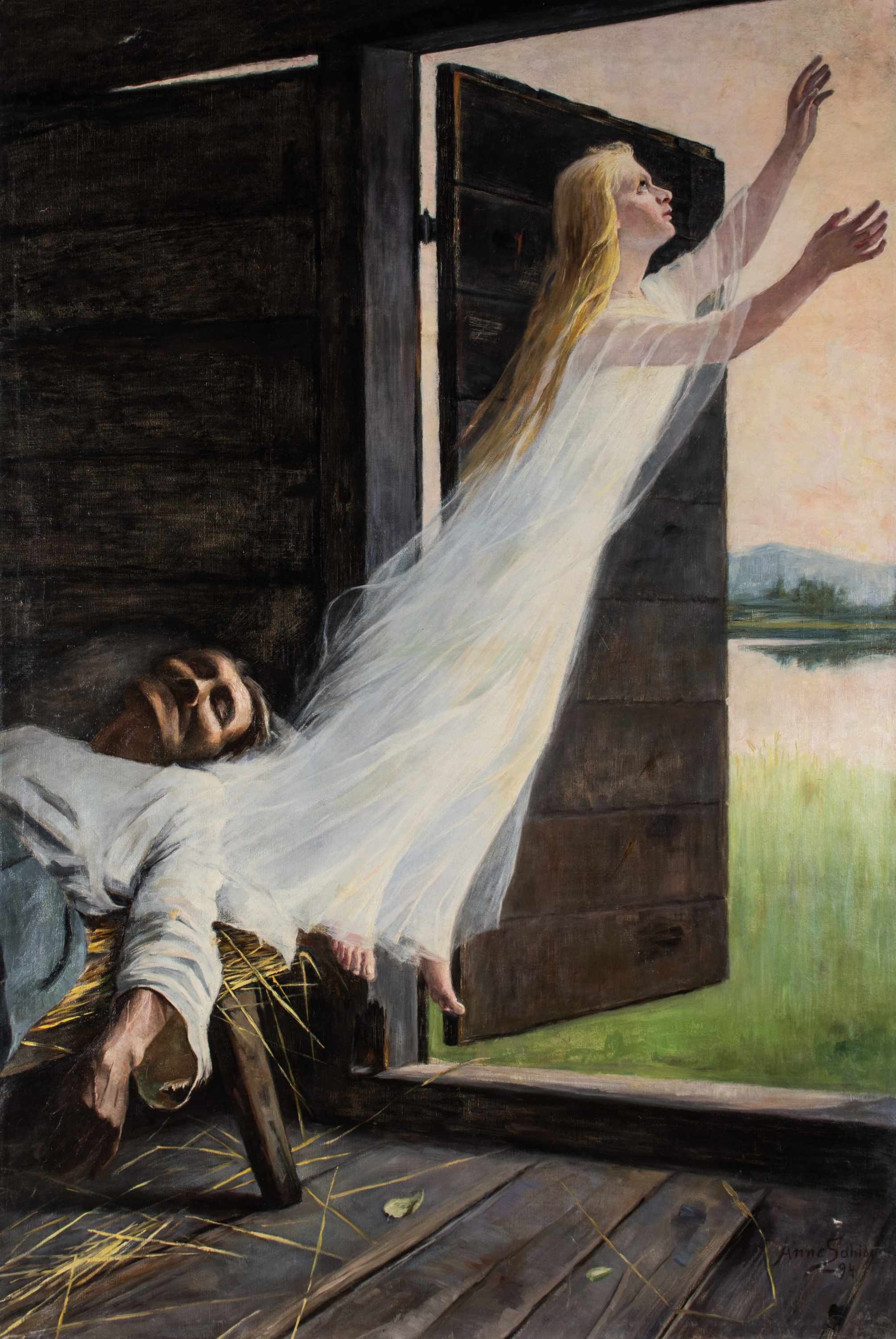
Passage, 1894

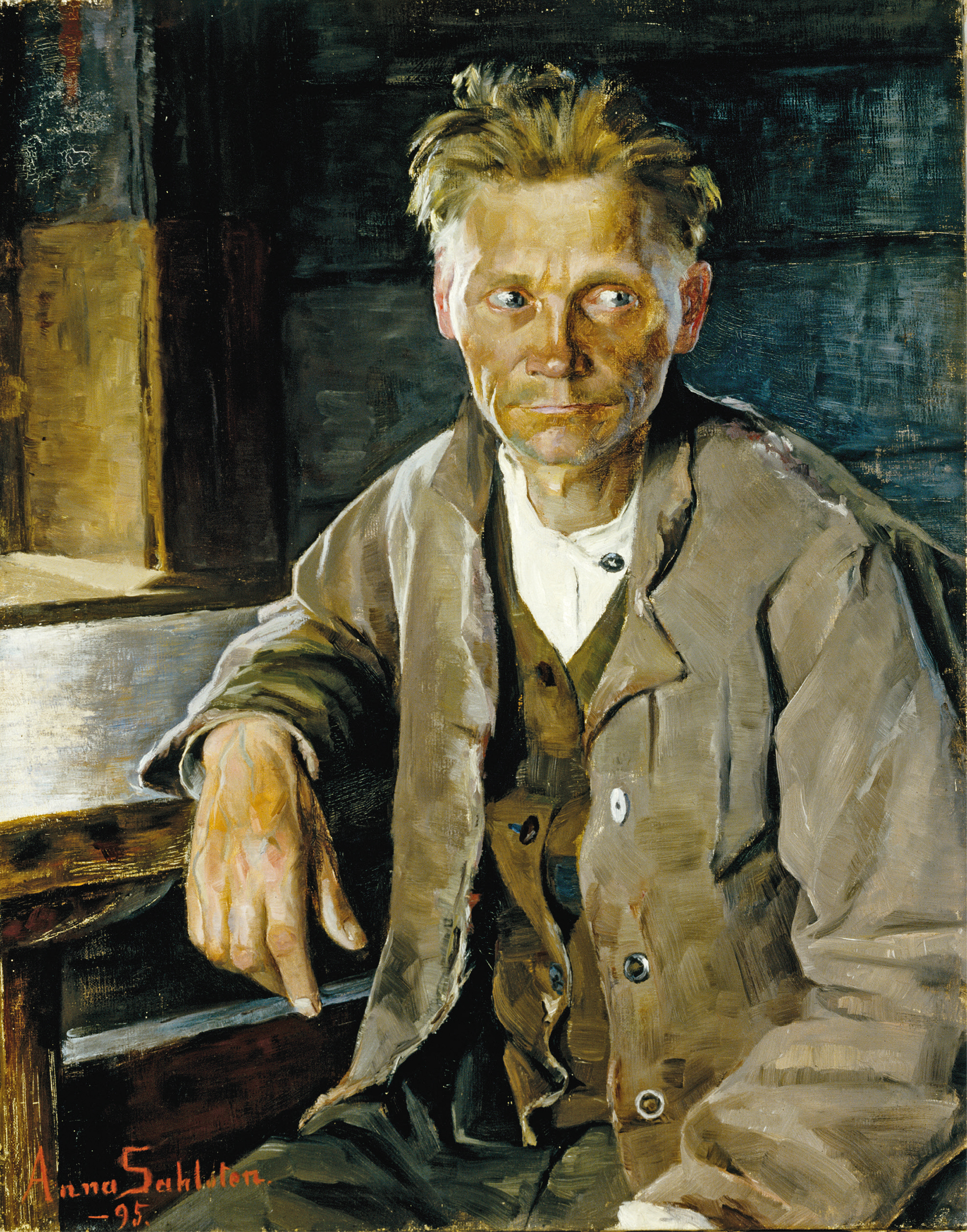
Bread Worries, 1895

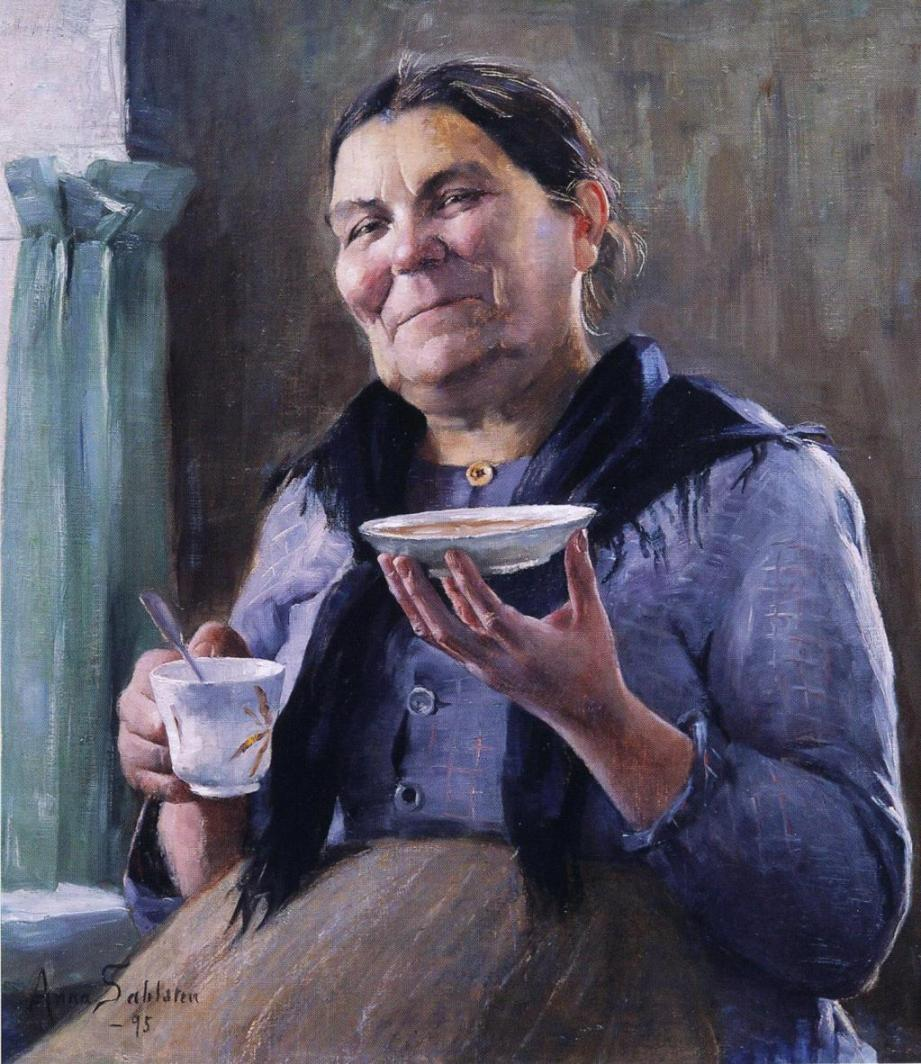
Coffee Granny, 1895

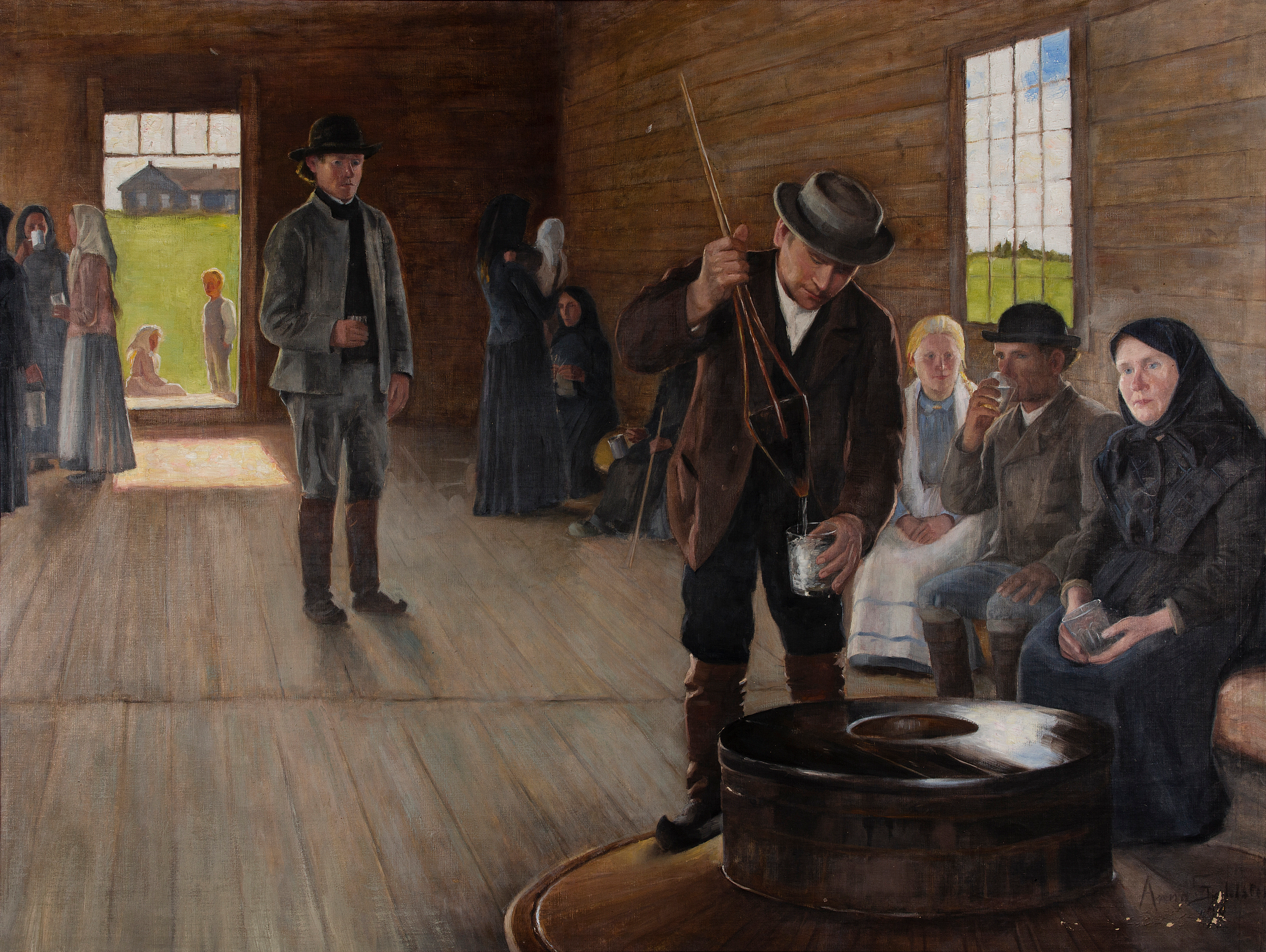
By the Well of Runni, 1898

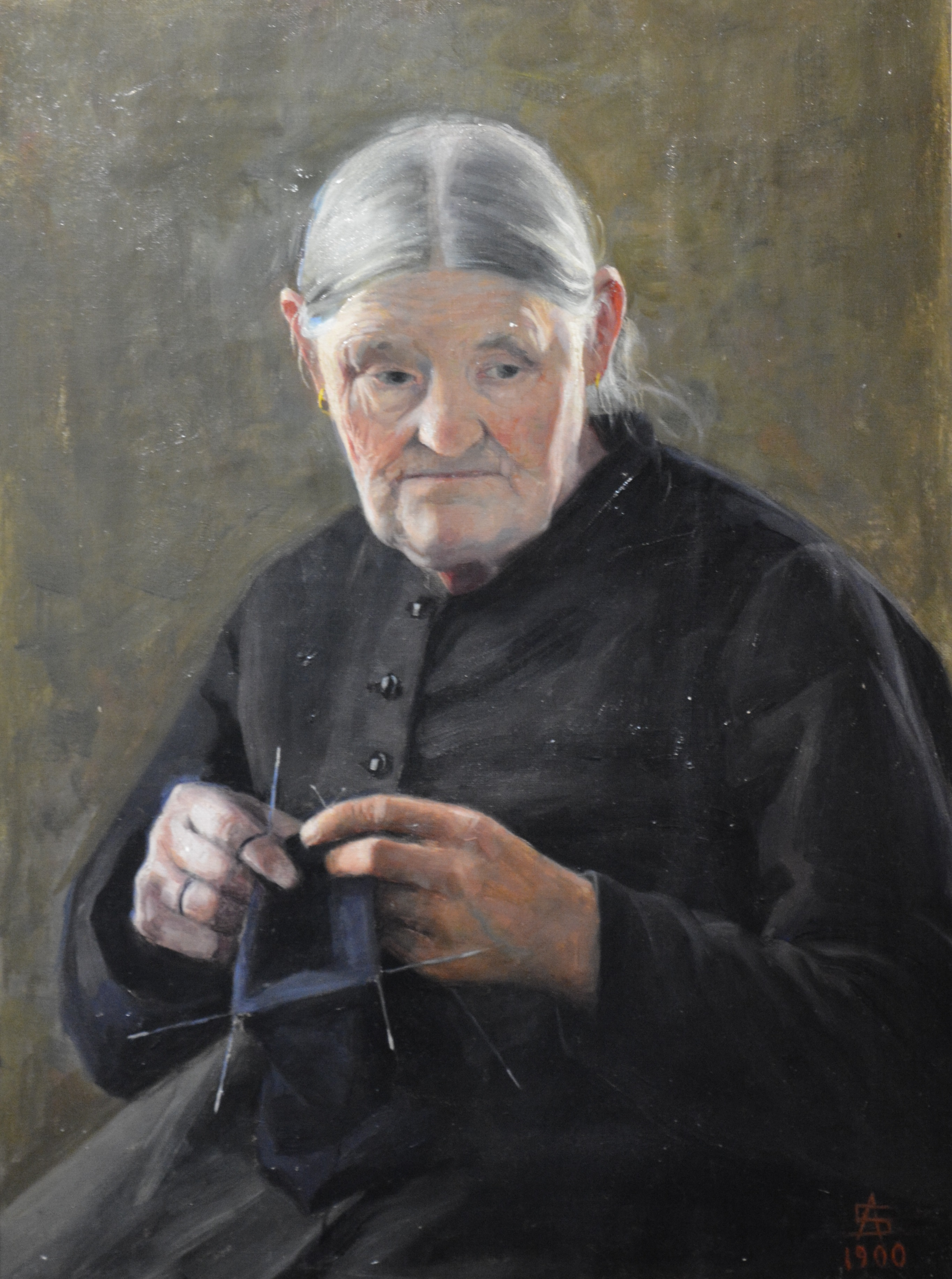
Old Woman Stitching, 1900

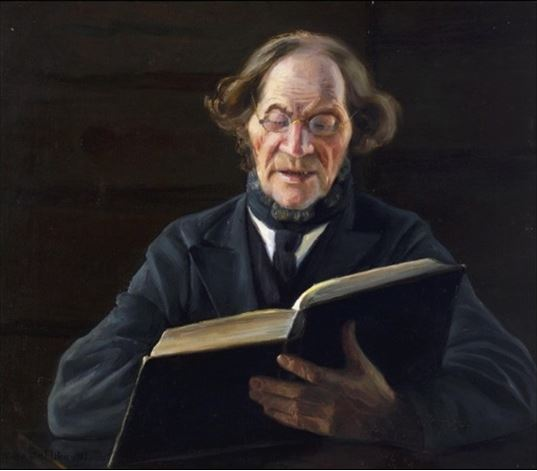
Man from Karelia, 1902

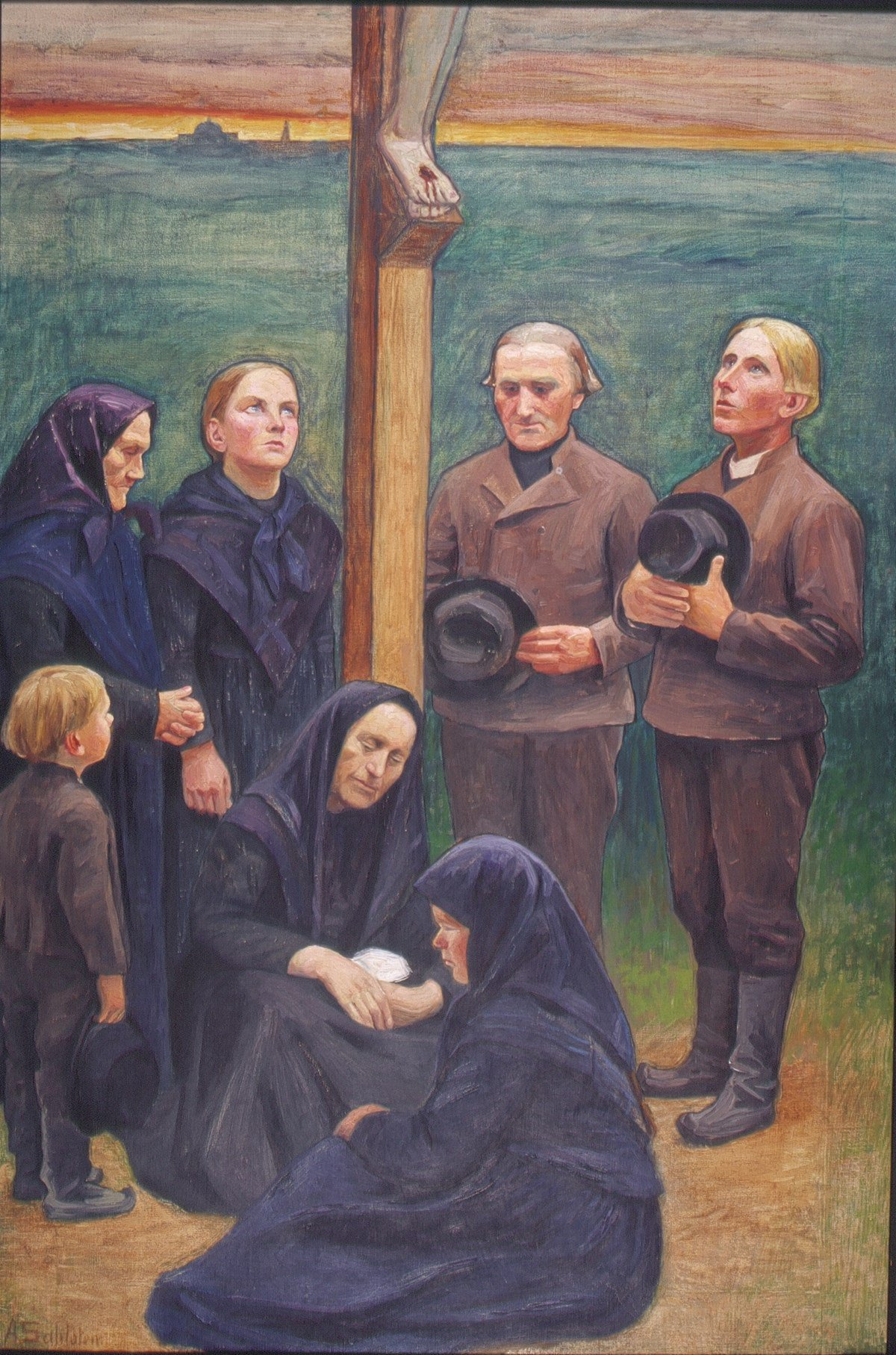
At the Foot of the Cross

== See also ==
- Golden Age of Finnish Art
- Finnish art
