= Julie Delance-Feurgard =

French painter

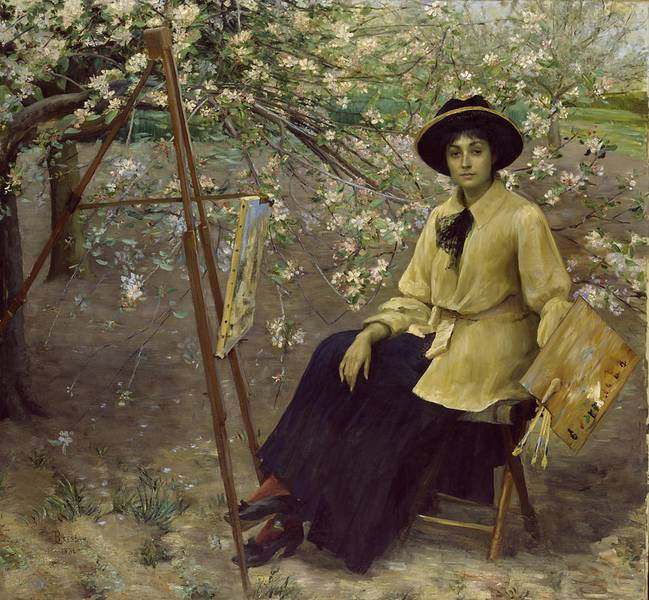
- Portrait of Julie Feurgard by Louise Catherine Breslau, 1886
- Born: Julie Feurgard; 8 November 1859; Paris, France
- Died: 11 January 1892 (aged 32); Paris, France
- Known for: Painting
- Spouse: Paul-Louis Delance (m. 1886)

Julie Delance-Feurgard (November 8, 1859 – January 11, 1892) was a French painter. She was known for her landscapes and genre paintings.

== Biography ==
Delance-Feurgard was born on 8 November 1859 in Paris, France. She attended the Académie Julian. She studied under Jean-Léon Gérôme and Léon Bonnat. She was a classmate of the artist Louise Catherine Breslau.

Delance-Feurgard exhibited at the Paris Salon, earning an honourable mention in 1889. She was an associate of the Société Nationale des Beaux-Arts and also exhibited regularly at the Durand-Ruel gallery.

She married painter and teacher Paul-Louis Delance in 1886. She died in Paris on 11 January 1892 at the age of 32.

Delance-Feurgard was included in the 2018 exhibit Women in Paris 1850-1900.

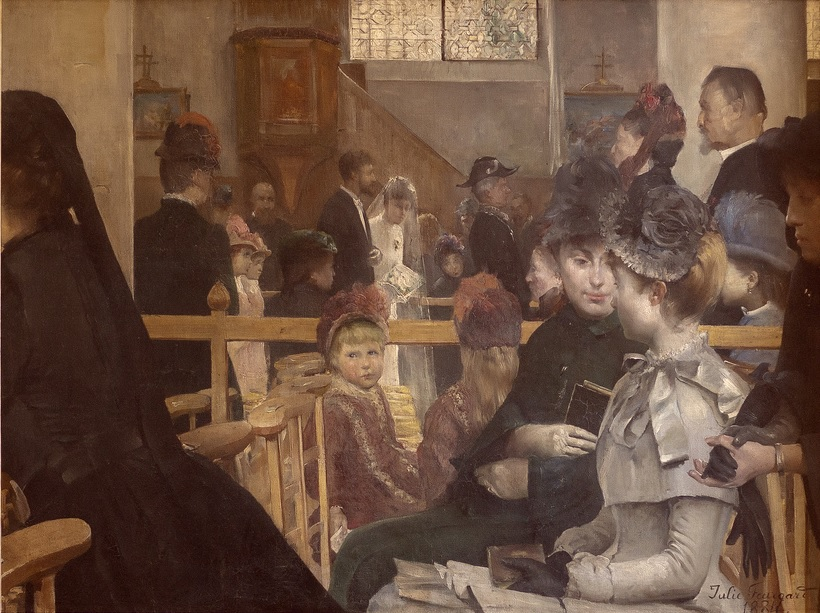
The Marriage, 1884
