= Paul-Louis Delance =

French painter and educator

- Born: Paul-Louis Gustave Delance; March 14, 1848; Paris, France
- Died: October 16, 1924 (aged 76); Paris, France
- Other names: Paul Delance
- Education: École des Beaux-Arts
- Spouse: Julie Feurgard
- Children: 1
- Awards: Legion of Honour - Knight (17 July 1908)

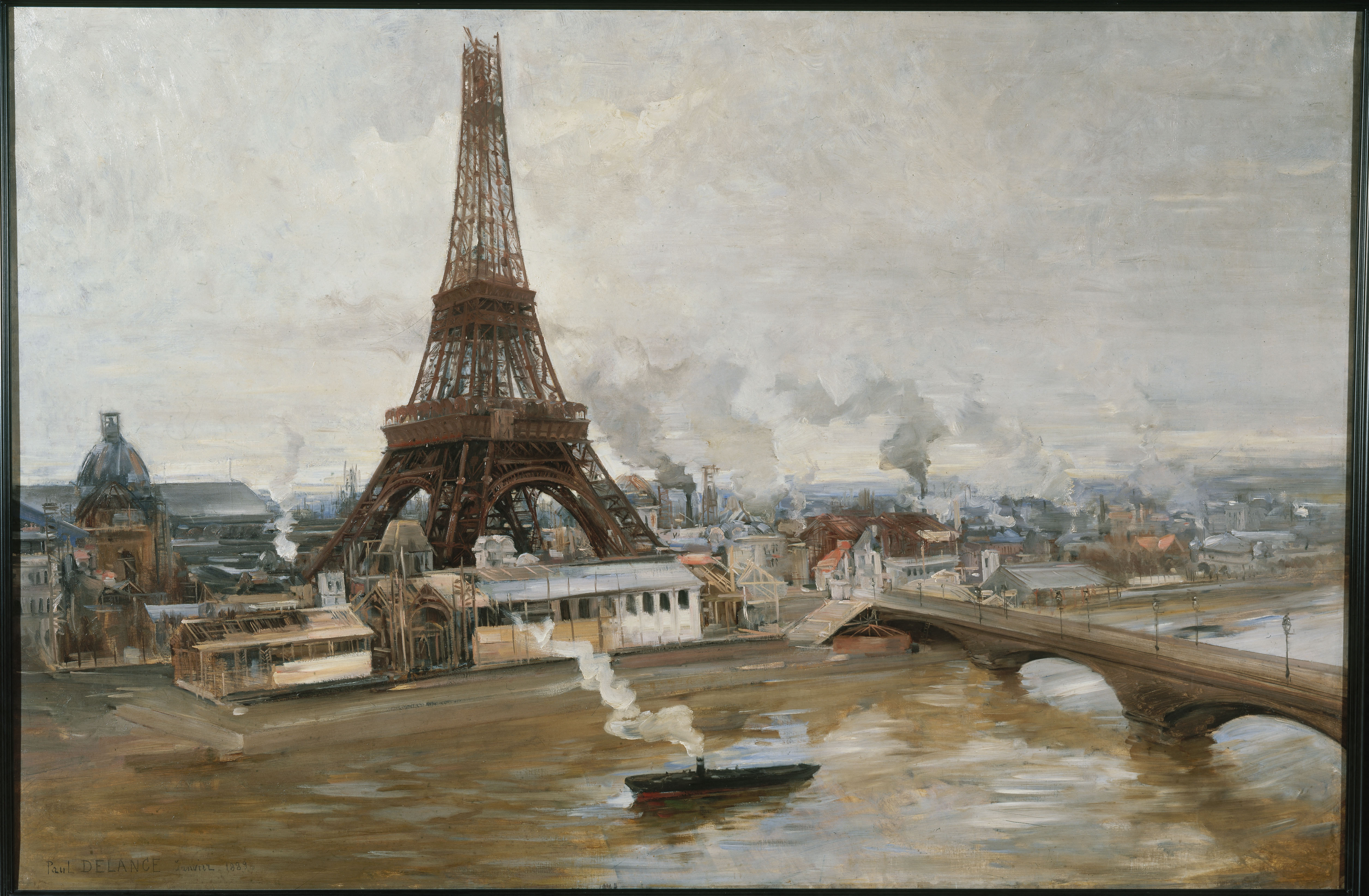
La tour Eiffel vue de la Seine (1889), oil painting by Delance

Paul-Louis Delance (1848–1924) was a French painter and educator. He is known for his allegorical and genre scene paintings early in his career, and his religious, and landscape paintings later in his career.

== Early life and education ==
Paul-Louis Gustave Delance was born on March 14, 1848, in Paris, France. His grandfather was Comte Joseph van Roosebeck from Belgium.

Delance studied art at École des Beaux-Arts with Jean-Léon Gérôme and Léon Bonnat. Delance first participated in the Salon in 1865 and was active until 1874. He joined the French Army during the Franco-Prussian War (from 1870 to 1871).

== Career ==
He taught at the Académie Delécluse, the Dominican school at Arcueil, and taught private lessons. Students of his included Jean Mannheim, John Noble Barlow, Robert Burns, Jenny Eakin Delony, Anna Sahlstén, William Edwin Atkinson, among others.

In 1886, he married one of his pupils, Julie Feurgard. Together they had a daughter, Alice Delance (1888–1973). Julie Feurgard died in 1892, as a result of her death, Delance's paintings became focused on landscape, portrait and religious subjects.

In 17 July 1908, Delance was awarded the Knight of France's Legion of Honour.

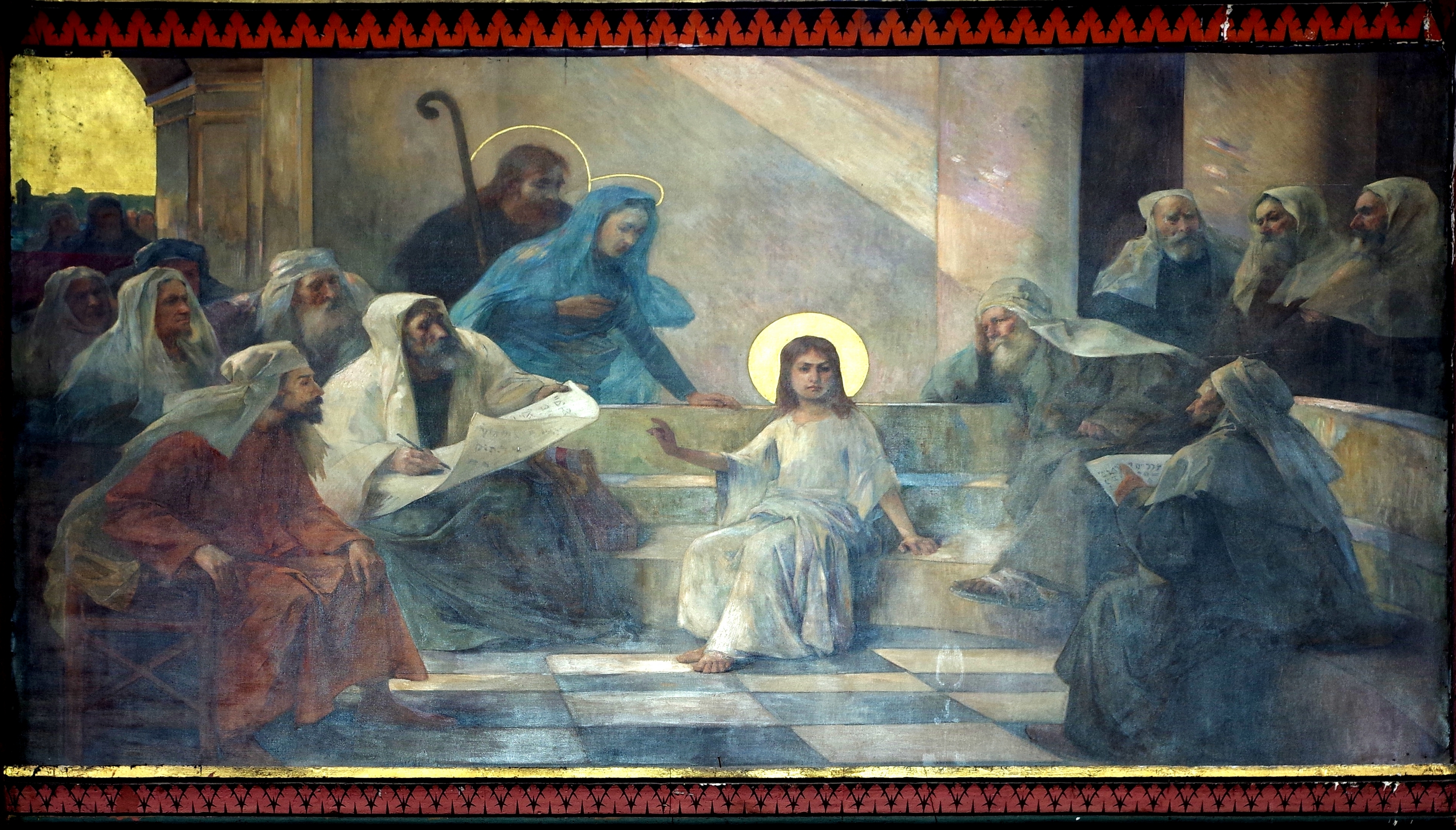
Christ among the doctors

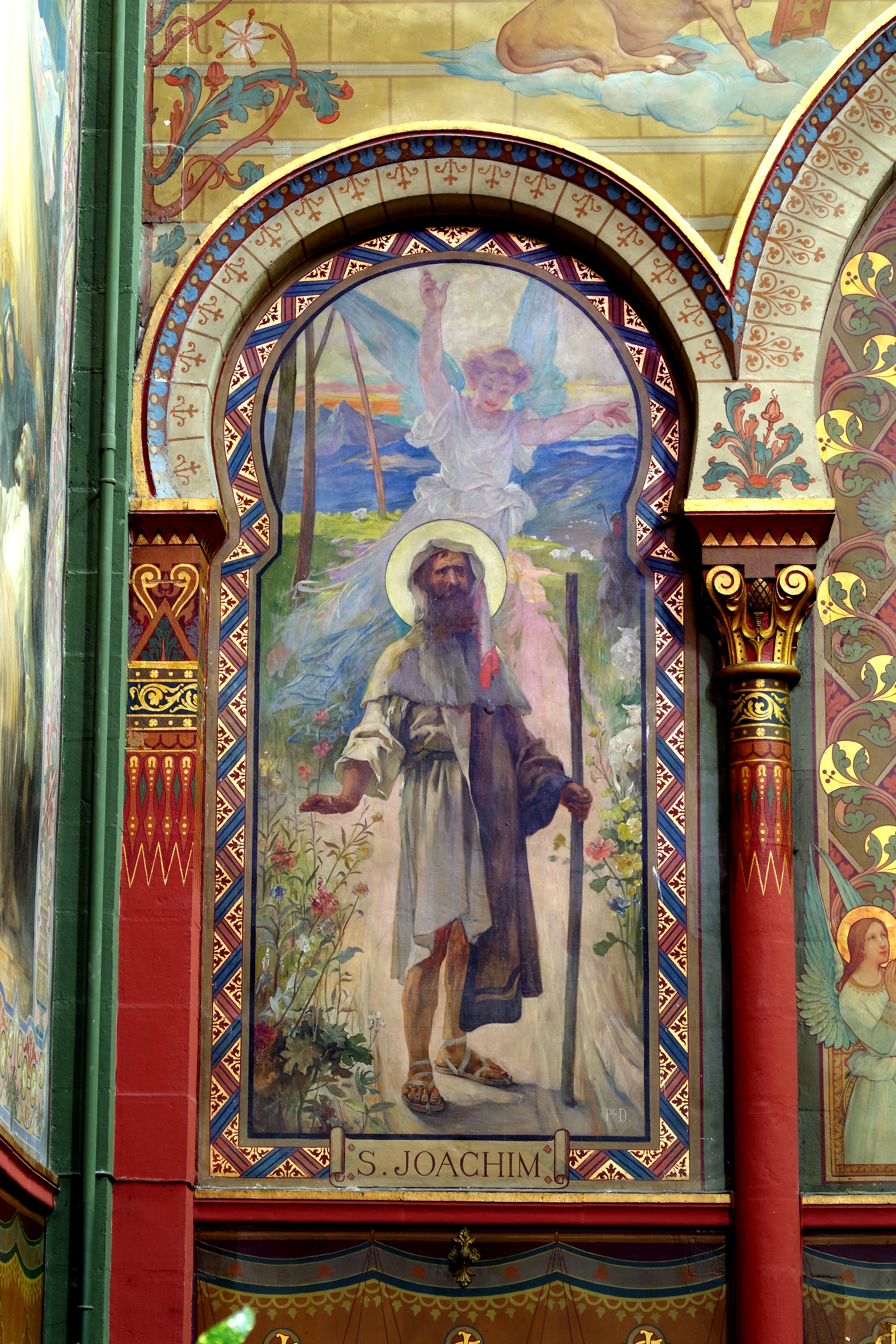
Saint Joachim

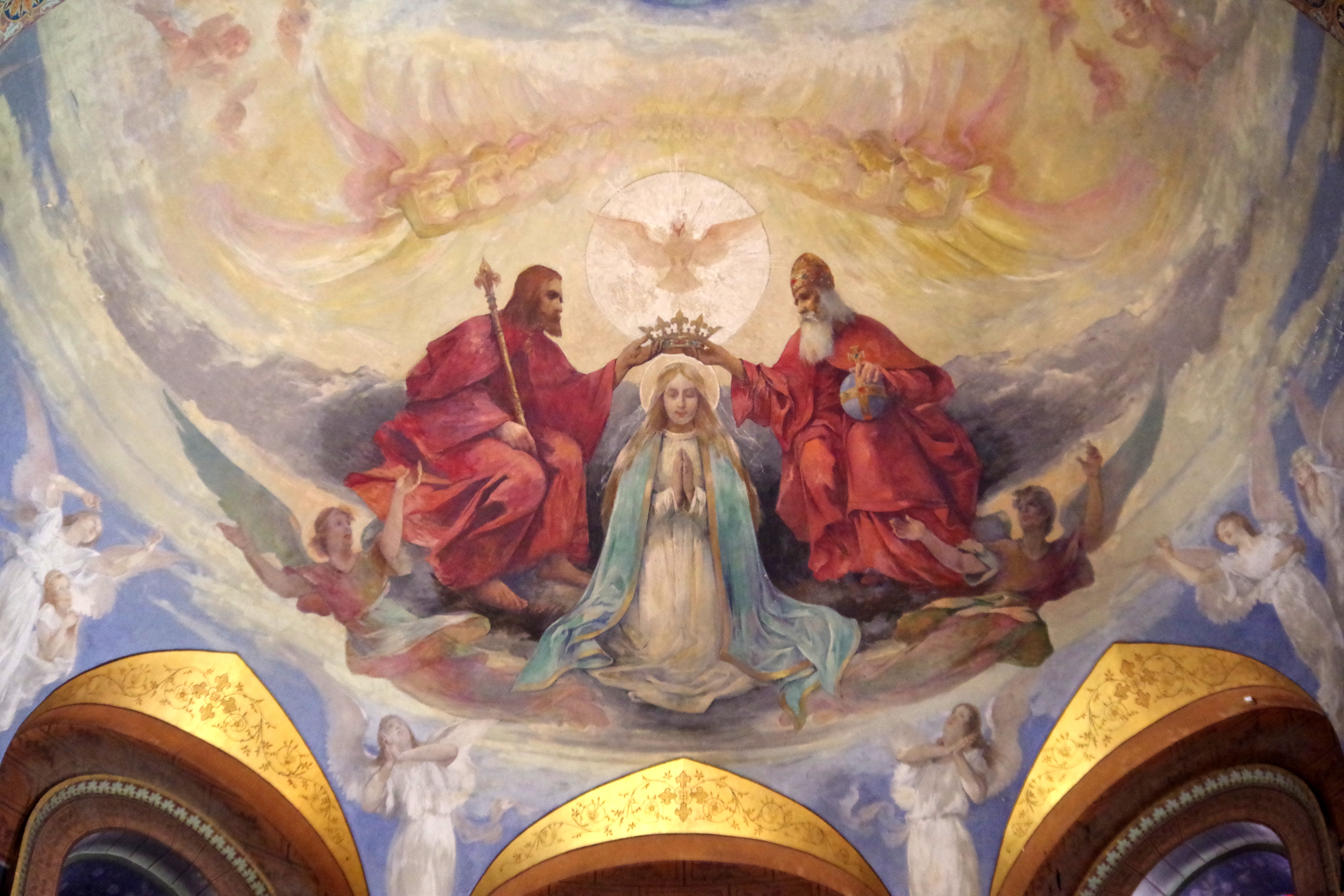
Coronation of the Virgin

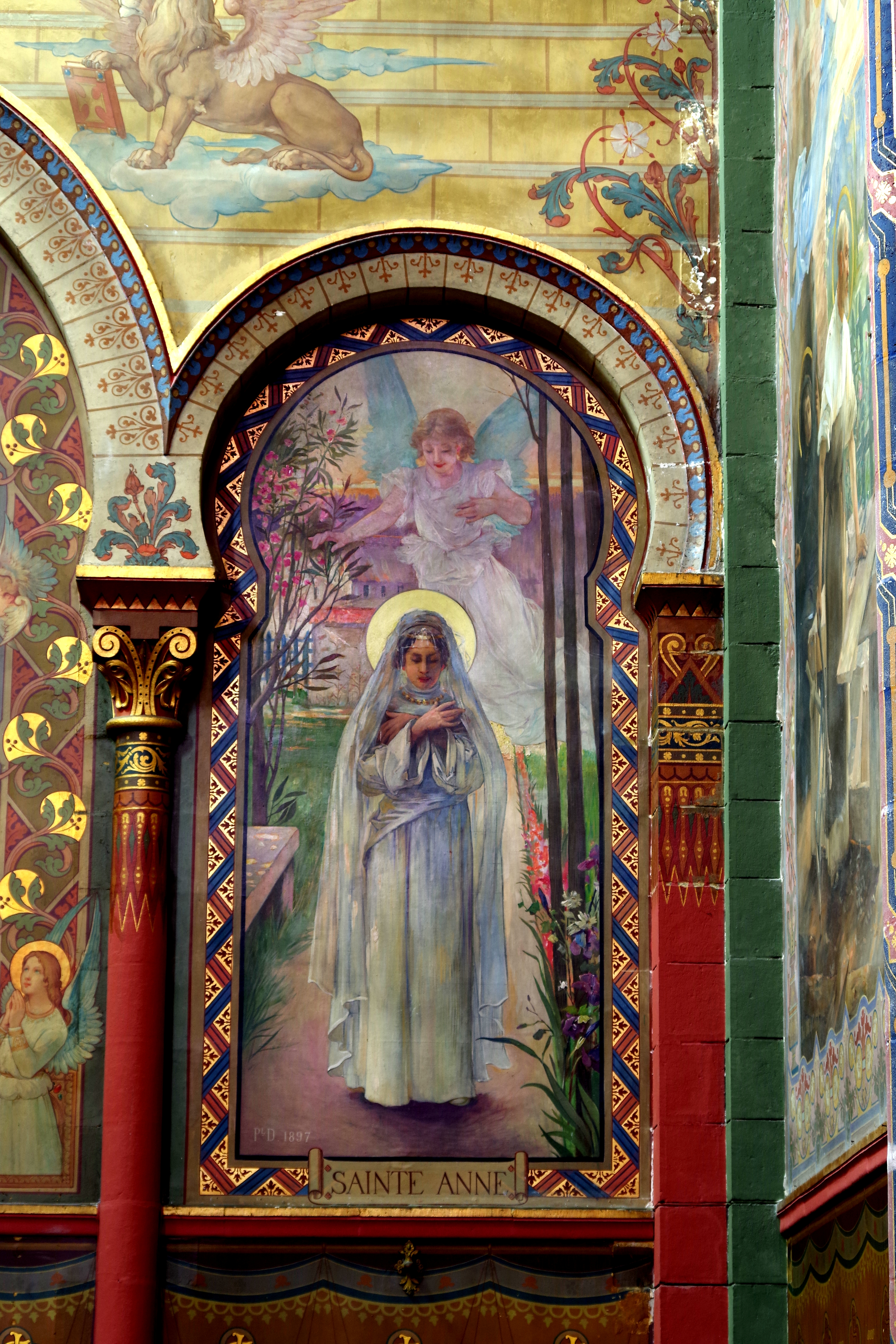
Saint Anne

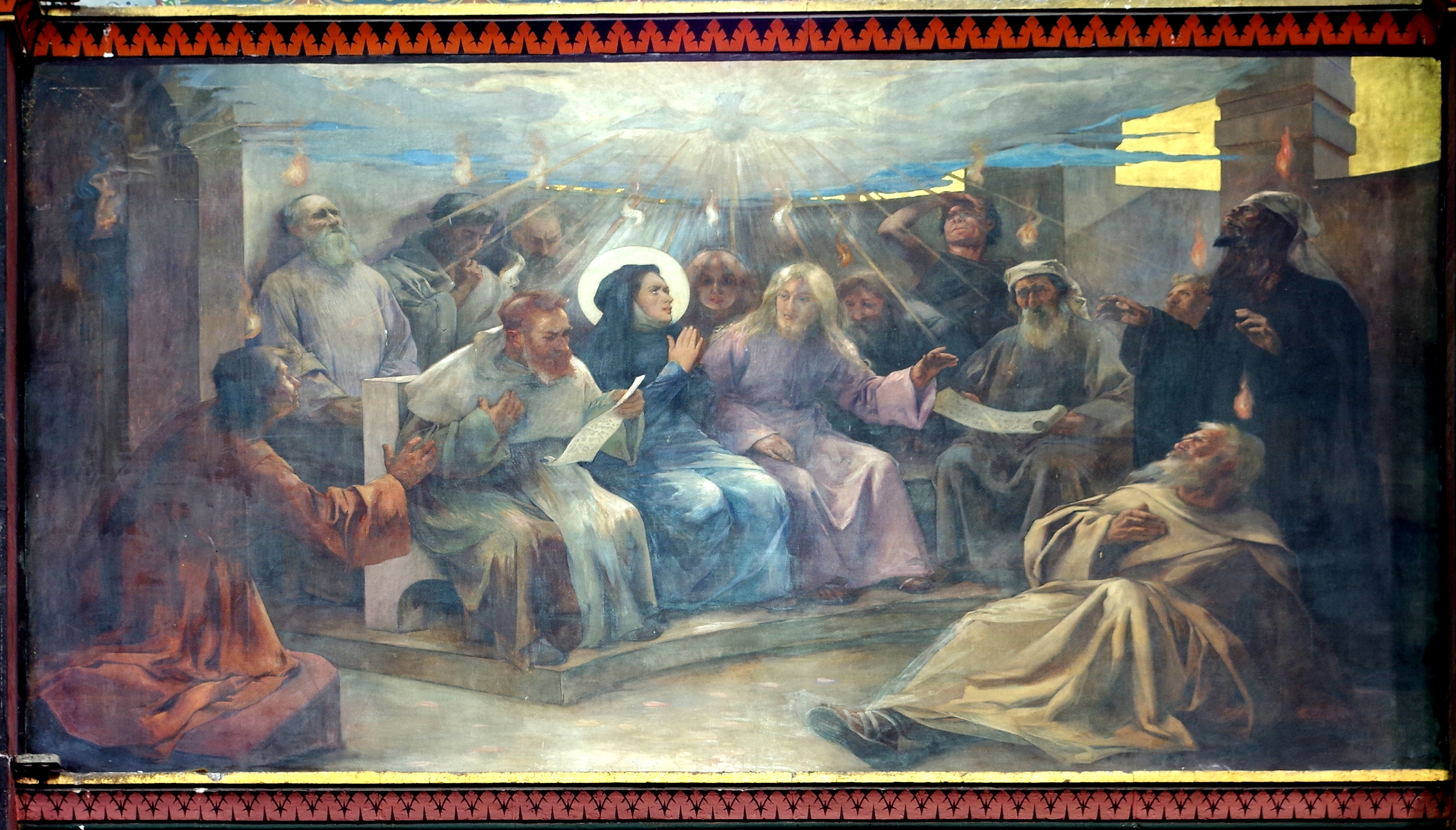
Pentecost

== Death and legacy ==
He died on October 16, 1924, in his home at 7 Bausset Street in the 15th arrondissement of Paris. Delance is buried at Passy Cemetery.

His work is included in various museum collections including National Museum Wales, Art Renewal Center, Carnavalet Museum, among others.
