= Calvet Museum =

Museum in Avignon, Vaucluse, France

Coordinates: 43.9471°N 4.8039°E

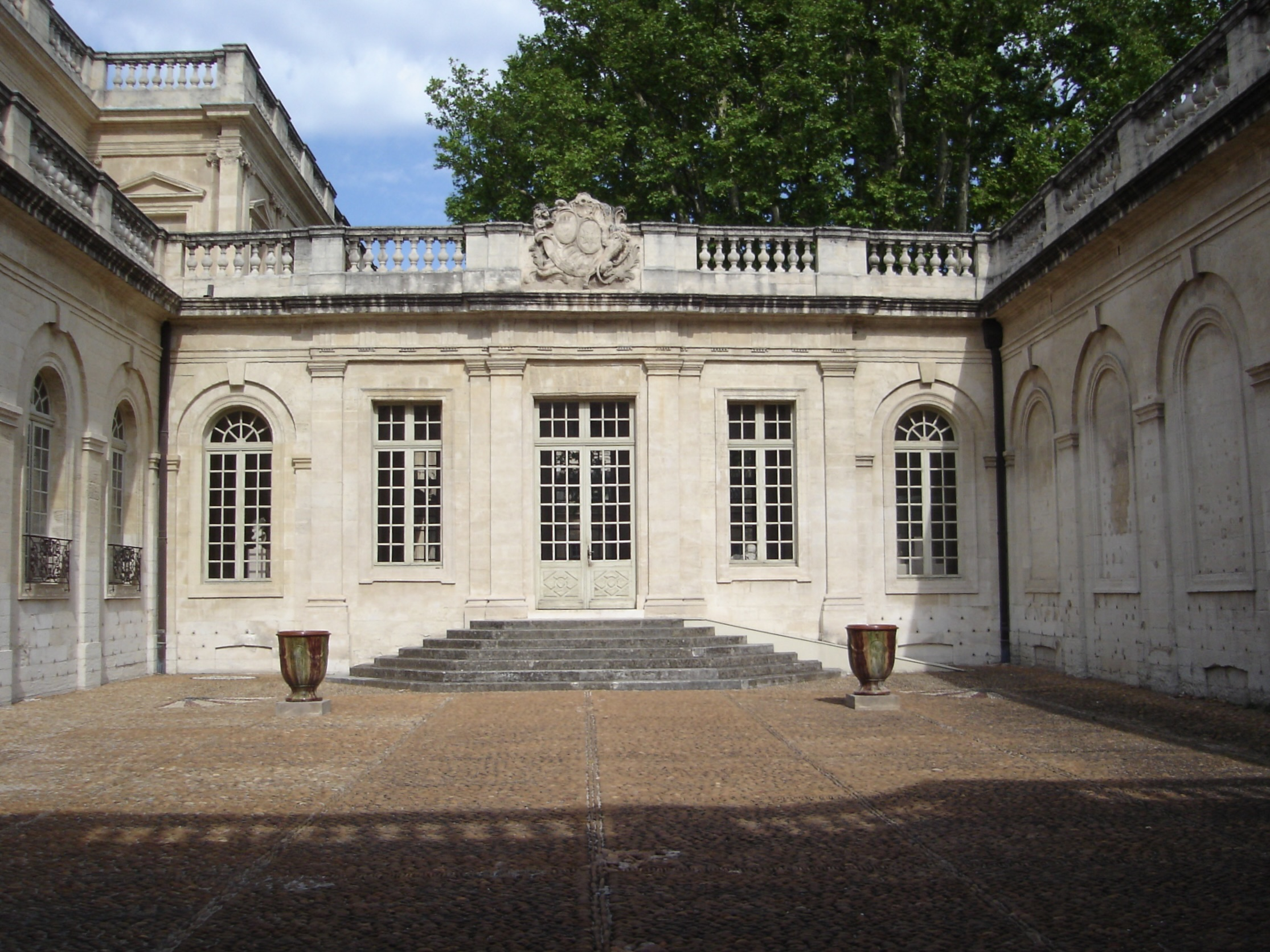
The main courtyard of the museum.

The Calvet Museum (French: musée Calvet, pronounced [myze kalvɛ]) is the main museum in Avignon. Since the 1980s the collection has been split between two buildings, with the fine arts housed in an 18th-century hôtel particulier and a separate Lapidary Museum in the former chapel of the city's Jesuit college on rue de la République. It is one of the museums run by the Fondation Calvet.

Its collections also include goldwork, faience, porcelain, tapestries, ironwork and other examples of the decorative arts, along with archaeology and Asian, Oceanic and African ethnography.

== History ==
=== The hôtel de Villeneuve-Martignan ===
The museum is housed in a building on the site of the Livrée de Cambrai, named after its last inhabitant, cardinal Pierre d'Ailly, bishop of Cambrai. In 1719, it was sold to François-René de Villeneuve, marquis d'Arzeliers and lord of Martignan, in the Principality of Orange.

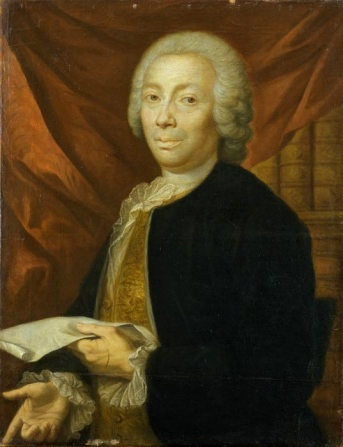
Philippe Sauvan (1698–1789), Portrait of Esprit Calvet (c. 1778–1780), Avignon, musée Calvet.

In 1734, de Villeneuve's son Jacques-Ignace de Villeneuve decided to extend the building to designs by Thomas Lainée, but later changed his mind and razed the whole building in 1741, replacing it with a completely new one to designs by Jean-Baptiste Franque. Work on this new construction was only completed in 1749, which was then bought in 1802 by the businessman Deleutre, who then rented it to the city authorities as a home for Esprit Calvet's collections. The authorities acquired it on 3 March 1833 to turn into a museum. The hôtel de Villeneuve-Martignan was made a monument historique on 1 October 1963.

=== Museum ===
A major collector and a physiocrat by training, Esprit Calvet devoted his life to medicine and arts. In 1810 his will left his library, natural history collection and cabinet of antiquities to his birthplace of Avignon, along with the necessary funds to make them accessible as an independent institution. Napoleon I issued a decree on 9 April 1811 from the palais des Tuileries allowing Avignon's mayor to accept the legacy for and in the name of the city of Avignon. The resulting museum was named after him and housed his collection.

== Collections ==
=== Paintings ===
==== French ====
===== 16th and 17th centuries =====
- Simon de Châlons : The Holy Family; The Adoration of the Shepherds; The Resurrection; Lament over the Dead Christ.
- Nicolas Mignard : Saint Michel Defeating the Rebel Angels; Saint Bruno at Prayer; Vice-Legate Frédéric Sforza; The Virgin Mary Granting the Scapular to Saint Simon Stock; Pietà; Self-Portrait.
- Reynaud Levieux : Laban Seeking His Idols; The Archangel Gabriel Appearing to Zacharias.
- Pierre Dupuis : Still Life with Vegetables and Apricots.
- Pierre Mignard : Portrait of Henri de Forbin Maynier, baron d'Oppède; Alexander Meets the Queen of the Amazons.
- Pierre II Mignard : Allegory of Spring; Allegory of Summer; Allegory of Autumn; Allegory of Winter; Apollo Flaying Marsyas; Noli me tangere.
French - 16th and 17th centuries

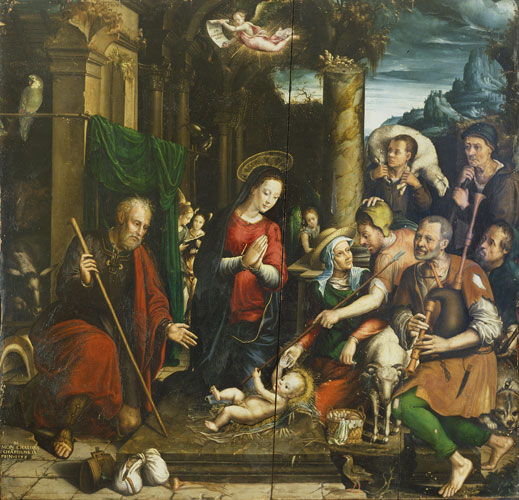
Simon de Châlons, Adoration of the Shepherds.

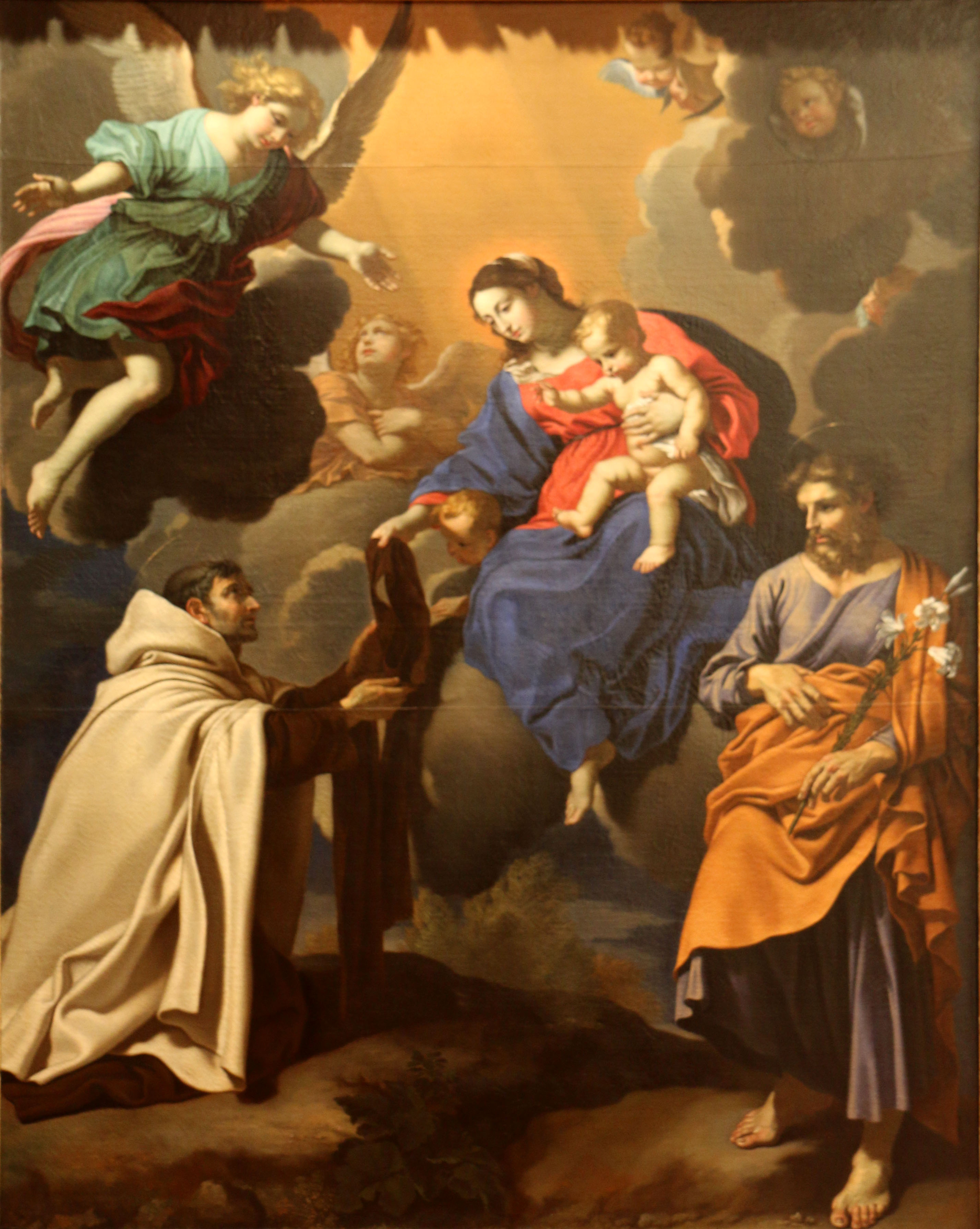
Nicolas Mignard, The Virgin Mary Granting the Scapular to Saint Simon Stock.

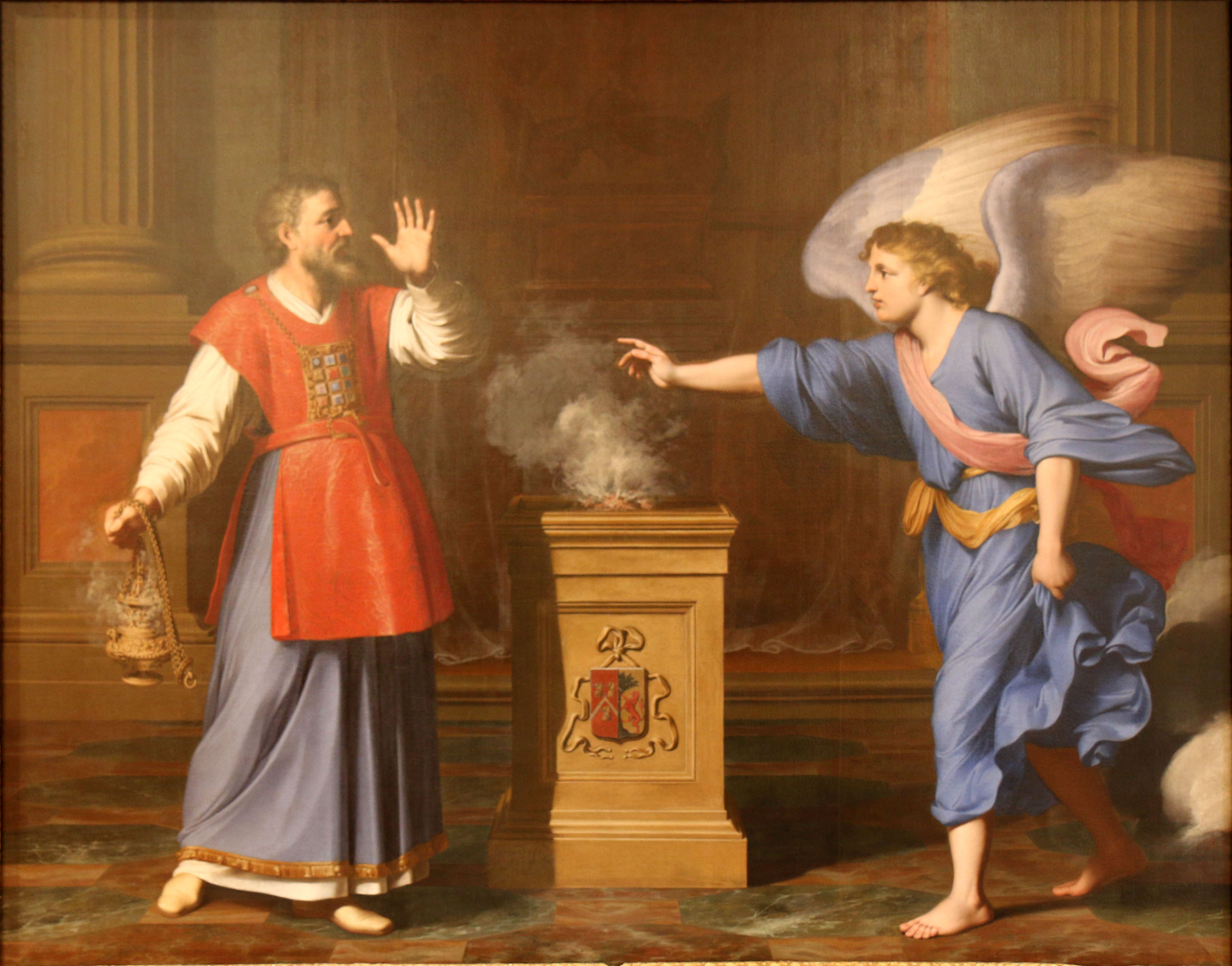
Reynaud Levieux, The Archangel Gabriel Appearing to Zacharias.

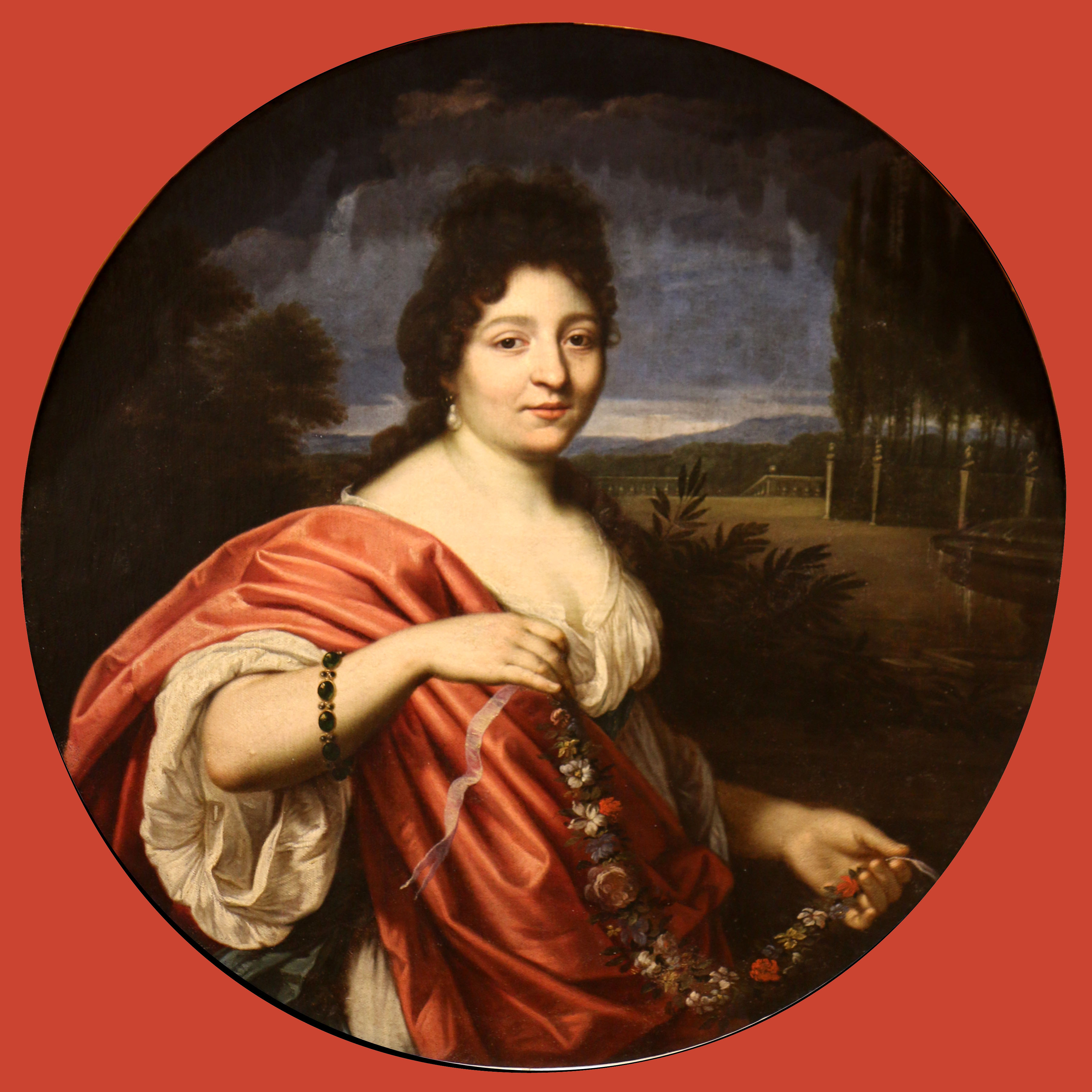
Pierre II Mignard, Allegory of Spring.

===== 18th century =====
- Nicolas de Largillierre : Portrait of Pierre Parrocel.
- Jean Raoux : Young Woman Reading a Letter; Silence, or Woman at a Window Drawing a Curtain.
- Pierre Parrocel : Resurrection.
- Étienne Parrocel : St John the Baptist Proclaiming the Messiah; Saint Camille de Lellis Presented to the Holy Trinity.
- Jean Valade : Marie-Anne de Montboissier-Beaufort-Canillac, marquise de Beaumont; Portrait of Joseph François Xavier de Seytres.
- Jacques de Lajoue : Seascape, Calm Weather.
- Philippe Sauvan : Sovereignty; Portrait of Esprit Calvet; The City of Avignon Restored to the Holy See.
- Joseph Vernet : Entry into a Seaport in Calm Weather; The Italian Gondola; Fresh Morning, Pleasure Party; Sailing Ship Wrecked on the Rocks; A Shepherdess in the Alps; Morning on Land, the Fish in the River; Midday on Land, Gale; Morning at Sea, Fog; Sea, Sunrise, Port with a Temple.
- Joseph-Marie Vien : Jesus Presented in the Temple
- Jean-Baptiste Marie Pierre : Beheading of St John the Baptist
- Louis-Michel van Loo : Portrait of Joseph Vernet.
- Hubert Robert : Spring; The Fontaine de Vaucluse; Landscape with Ruins and a Fountain; Herd in front of the Colisseum and the Arch of Constantine in Rome.
- Jean-Baptiste Regnault : The Centaur Chiron Educating Achilles.
- Pierre Peyron : Curius Dentatus Refusing Gifts from the Samnite Ambassadors.
- Jacques-Louis David : The Death of Joseph Bara.
- Élisabeth Vigée Le Brun : Portrait of Giuseppina Grassini.
French - 18th century

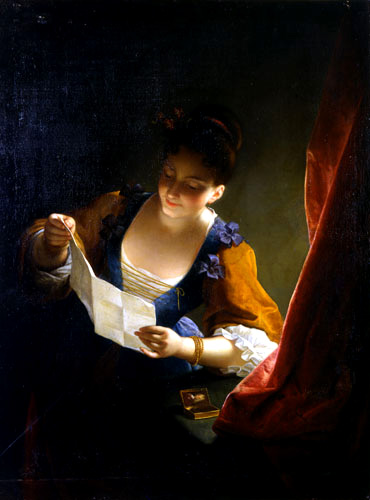
Jean Raoux, Young Woman Reading a Letter.

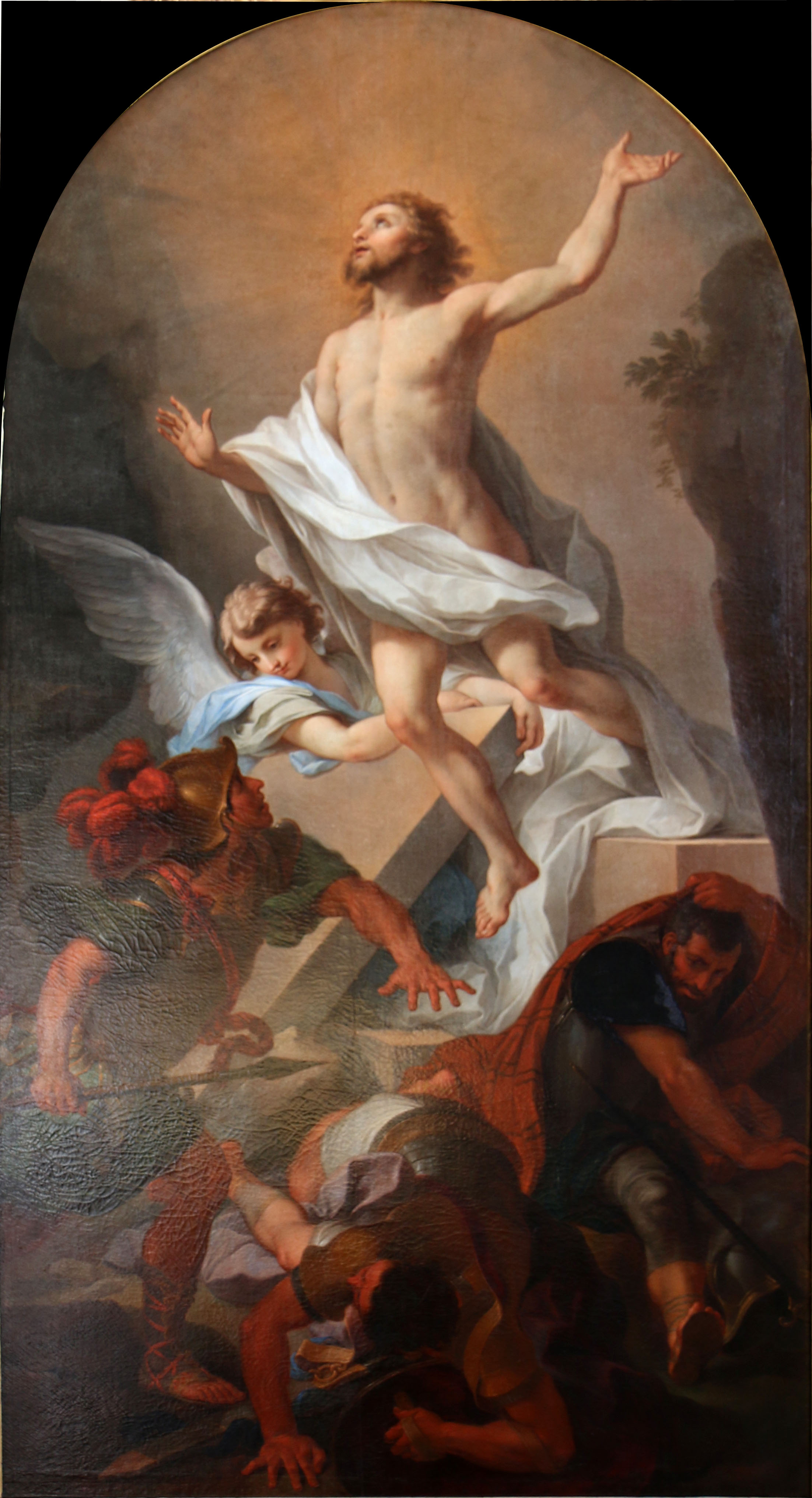
Pierre Parrocel, Resurrection.

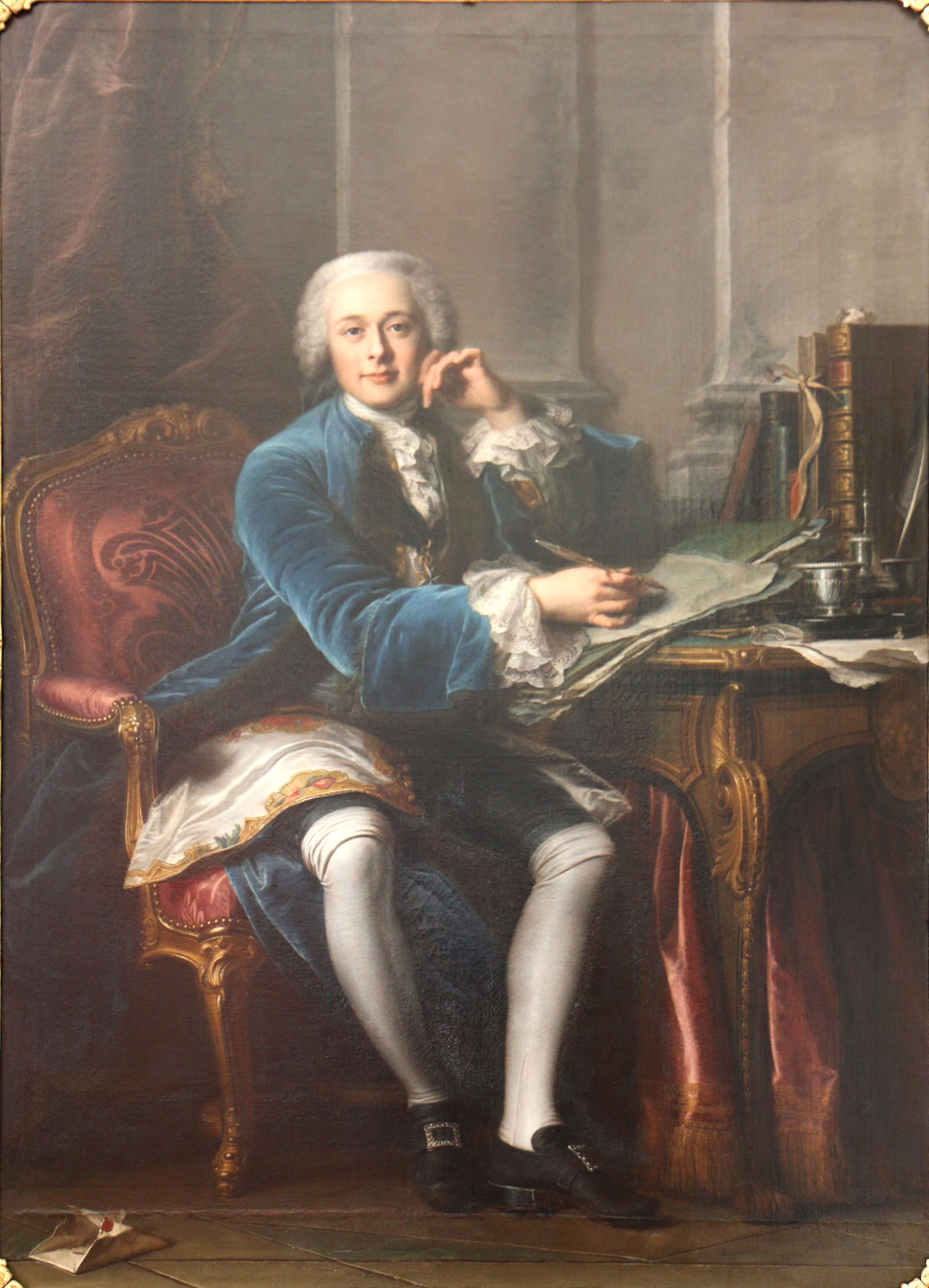
Jean Valade, Portrait of the marquis de Caumont.

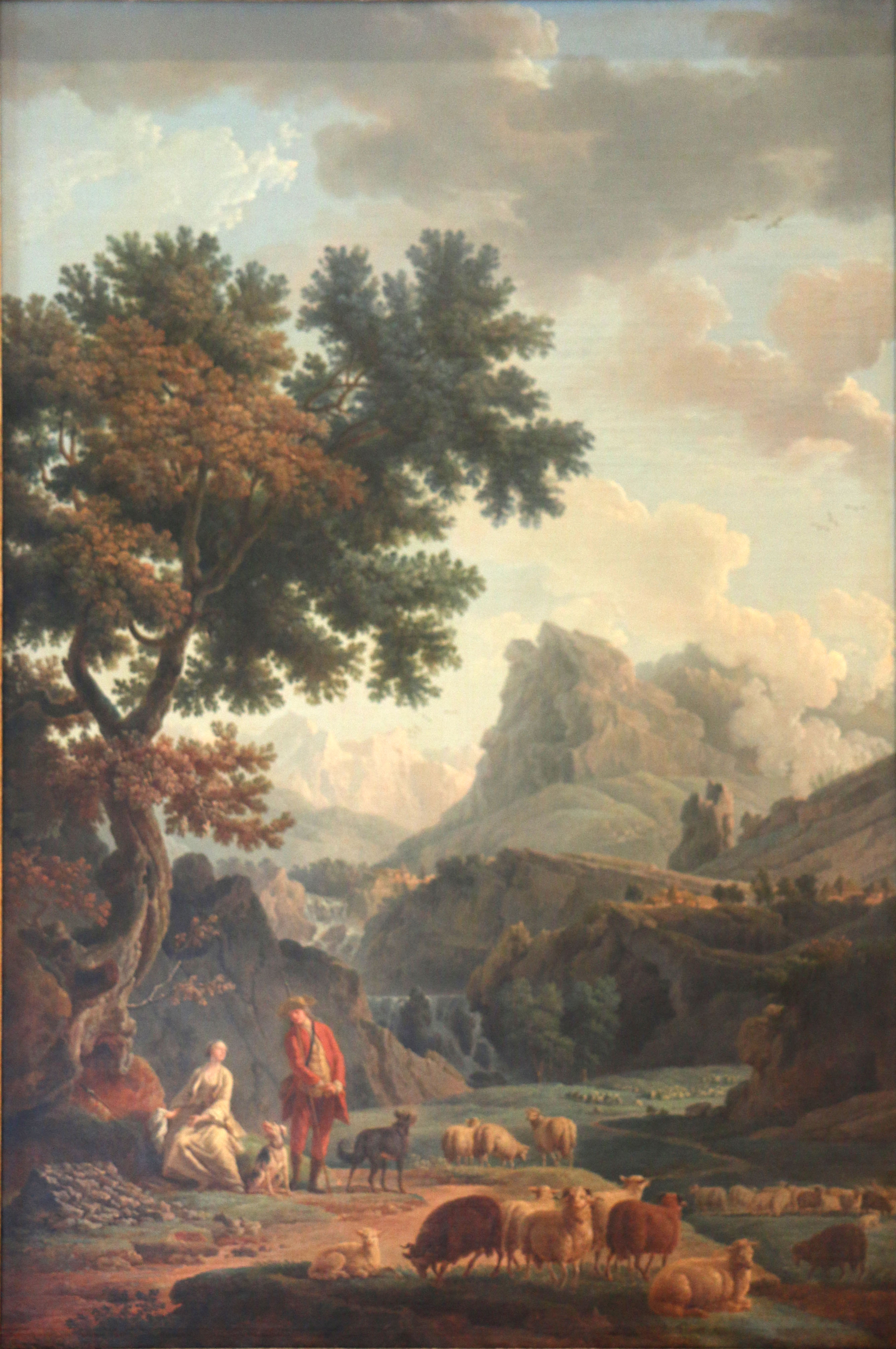
Joseph Vernet, A Shepherdess in the Alps.

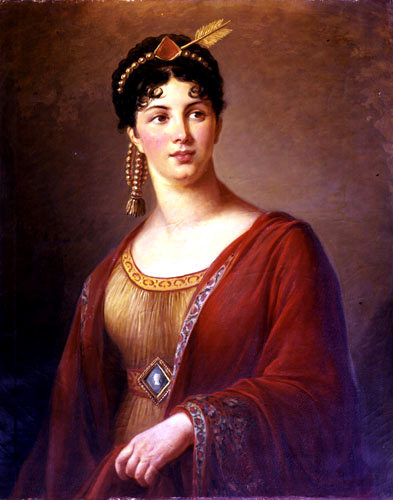
Élisabeth Vigée Le Brun, Portrait of Giuseppina Grassini.

===== 19th century =====
- Horace Vernet : Joseph Vernet Tied to a Mast During a Storm, oil on canvas, 1822; Mazepa and the Wolves, oil on canvas, 1826
- Jean-Joseph Lacroix : The Legend of Christ of the Black Penitents.
- Jean-Antoine Constantin : View of the Fontaine de Vaucluse.
- François Marius Granet : Jacques de Molay Received into the Templars.
- Claude Marie Paul Dubufe : Apollo and Cyparissa.
- Jean-Baptiste Camille Corot : Site in Italy.
- Jean-Joseph-Xavier Bidauld : Francis I at the Fontaine de Vaucluse.
- Eugène Devéria : Portrait of Calvet.
- Auguste-Barthélemy Glaize : Luca Signorelli Preparing to Paint His Son, Killed in a Duel at Cortona.
- D'après Antoine-Jean Gros : The Battle of Nazareth.
- Isidore Dagnan : View of Avignon and the pont Saint-Bénézet.
- Auguste Bigand : Caravaggio in His Studio.
- Pierre Révoil : Charles-Quint at the abbaye de Saint-Just.
- Paul Huet : General view of Avignon and Villeneuve-lès-Avignon from inside the fort Saint-André; View of Avignon from the North Side.
- Théodore Chassériau : Sleeping Bather.
- Alfred Sisley : The Church at Moret.
- Armand Guillaumin : The Pointe de la Baumette.
- Paul Guigou : Selfportrait, or Man with a Pipe.
- Pierre Grivolas : Flagellants in the 14th Century; The Market in place Pie.
- Victor Leydet : Before Mass; Portrait of a Standing Young Man.
- Paul Vayson : The Prodigal Son Guarding Pigs.
- Clément Brun : Street in Villeneuve-lès-Avignon.
- Pierre-Jérôme Lordon : Burial of Saint Sebastian, 1827.
French - 19th century

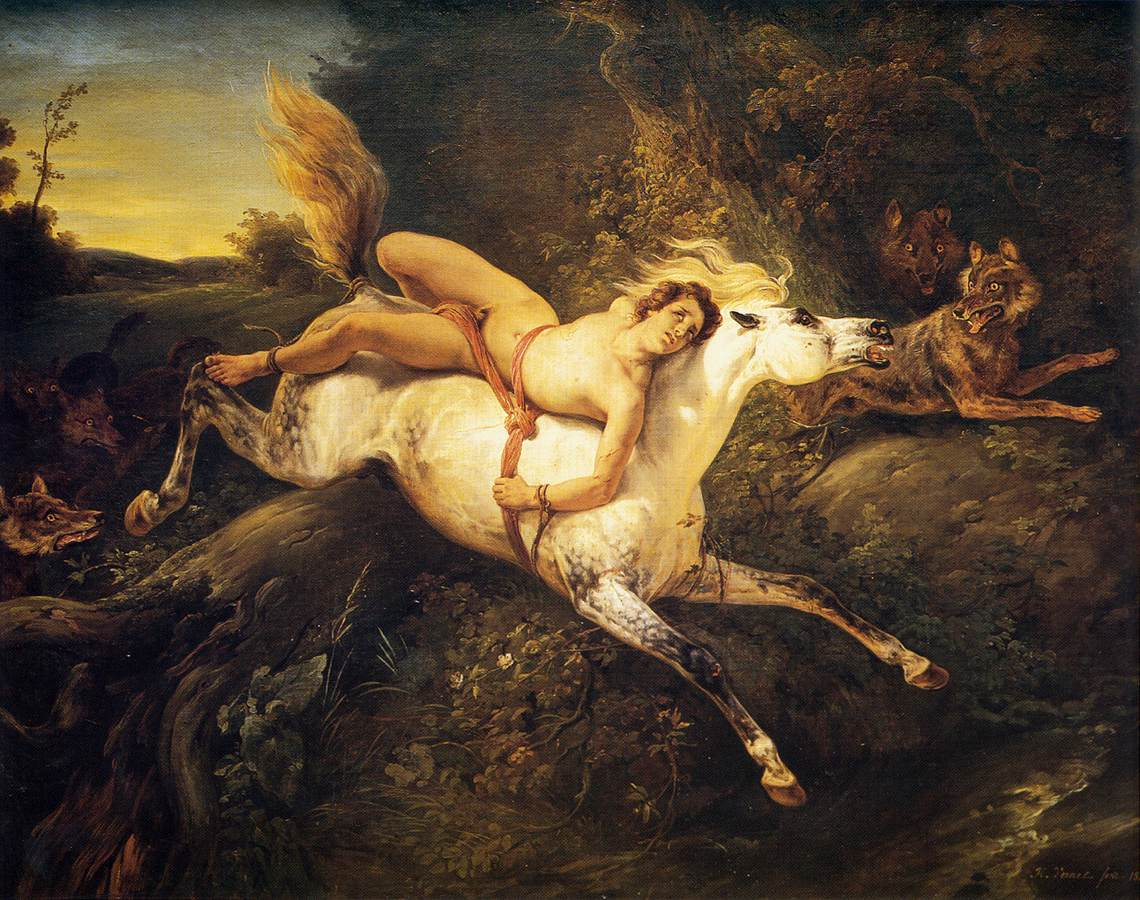
Horace Vernet, Mazeppa.

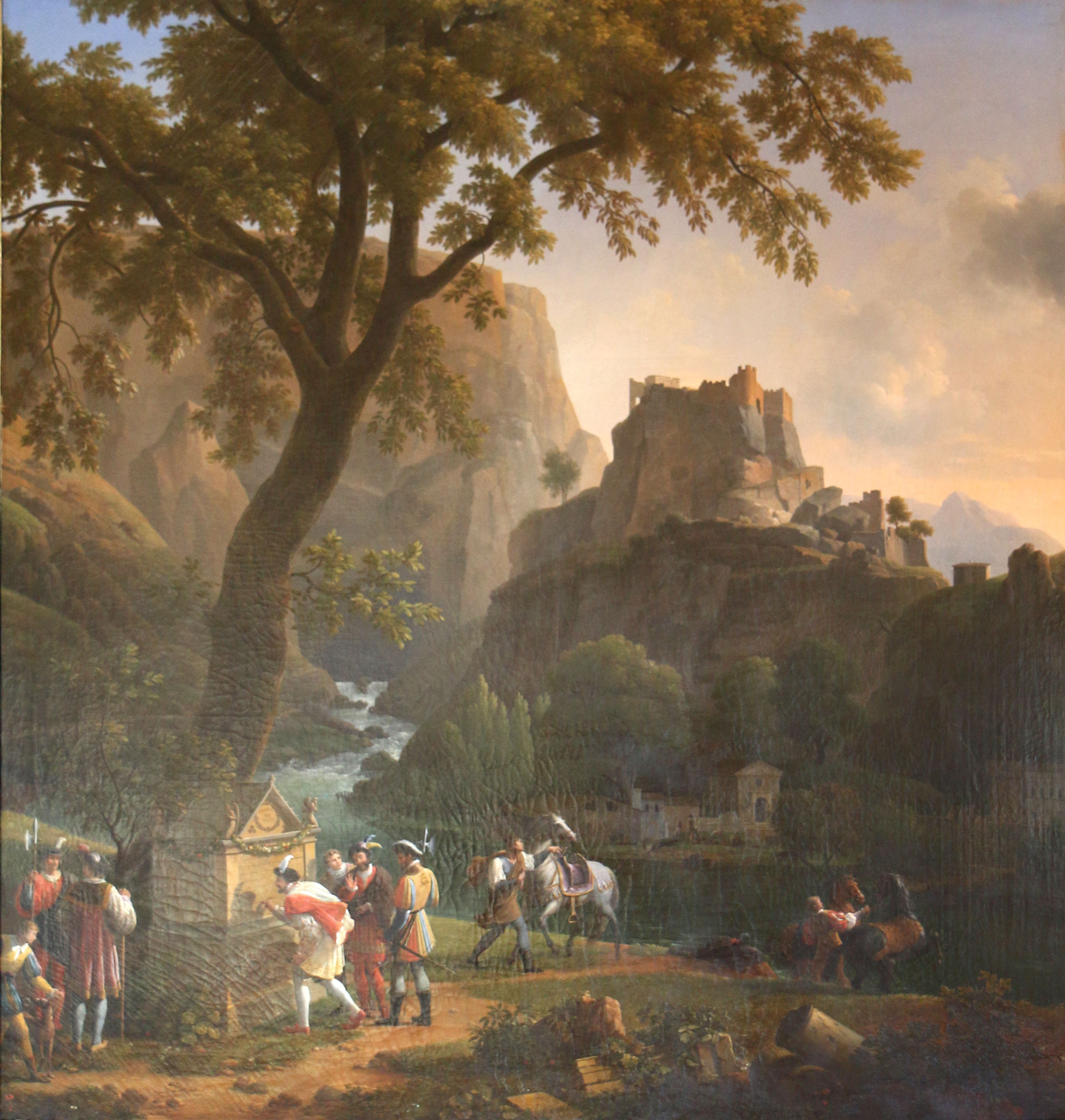
Jean-Joseph-Xavier Bidauld, Francis I at the Fontaine de Vaucluse.

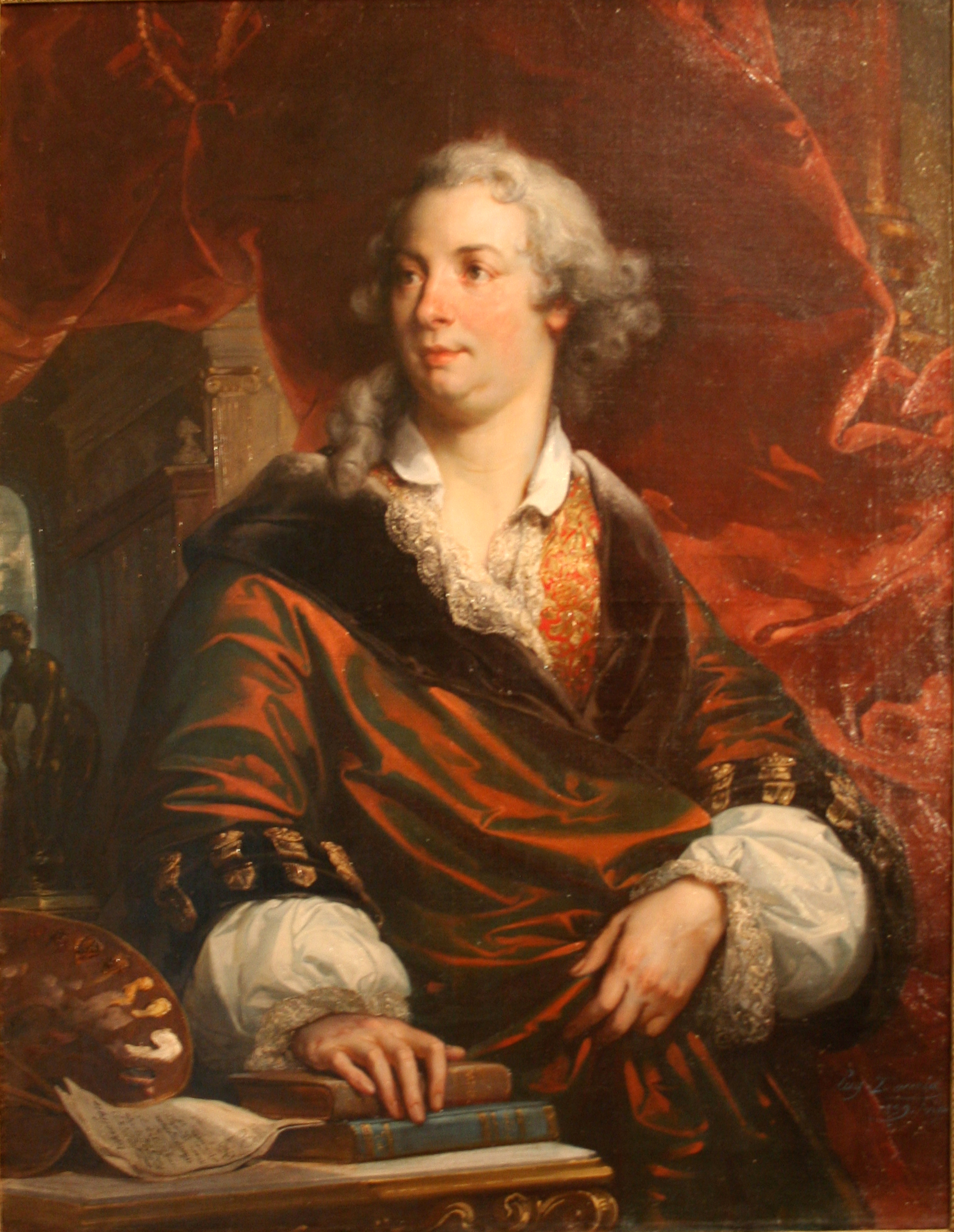
Eugène Devéria, Portrait of Calvet.

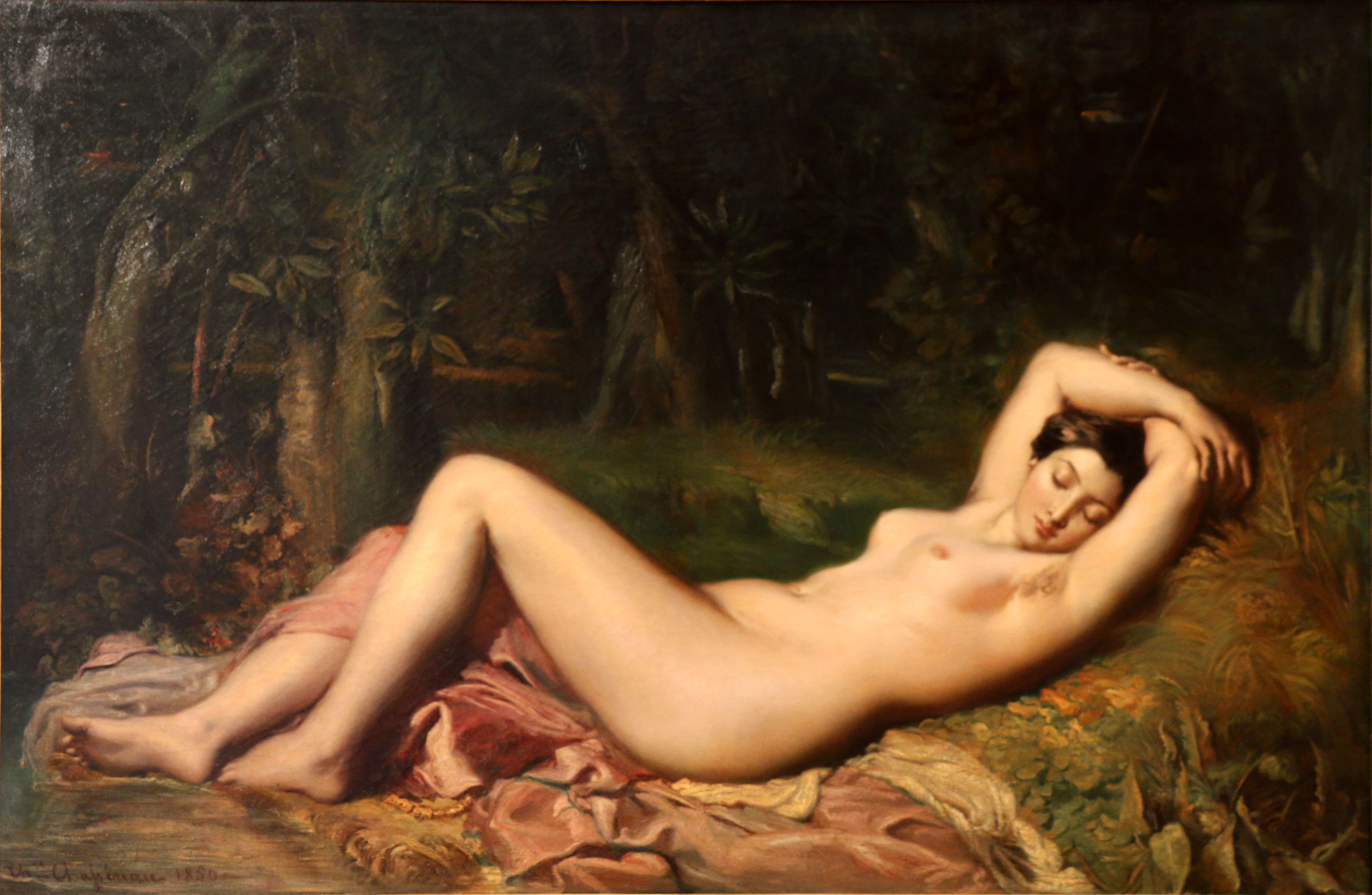
Théodore Chassériau, Sleeping Bather.

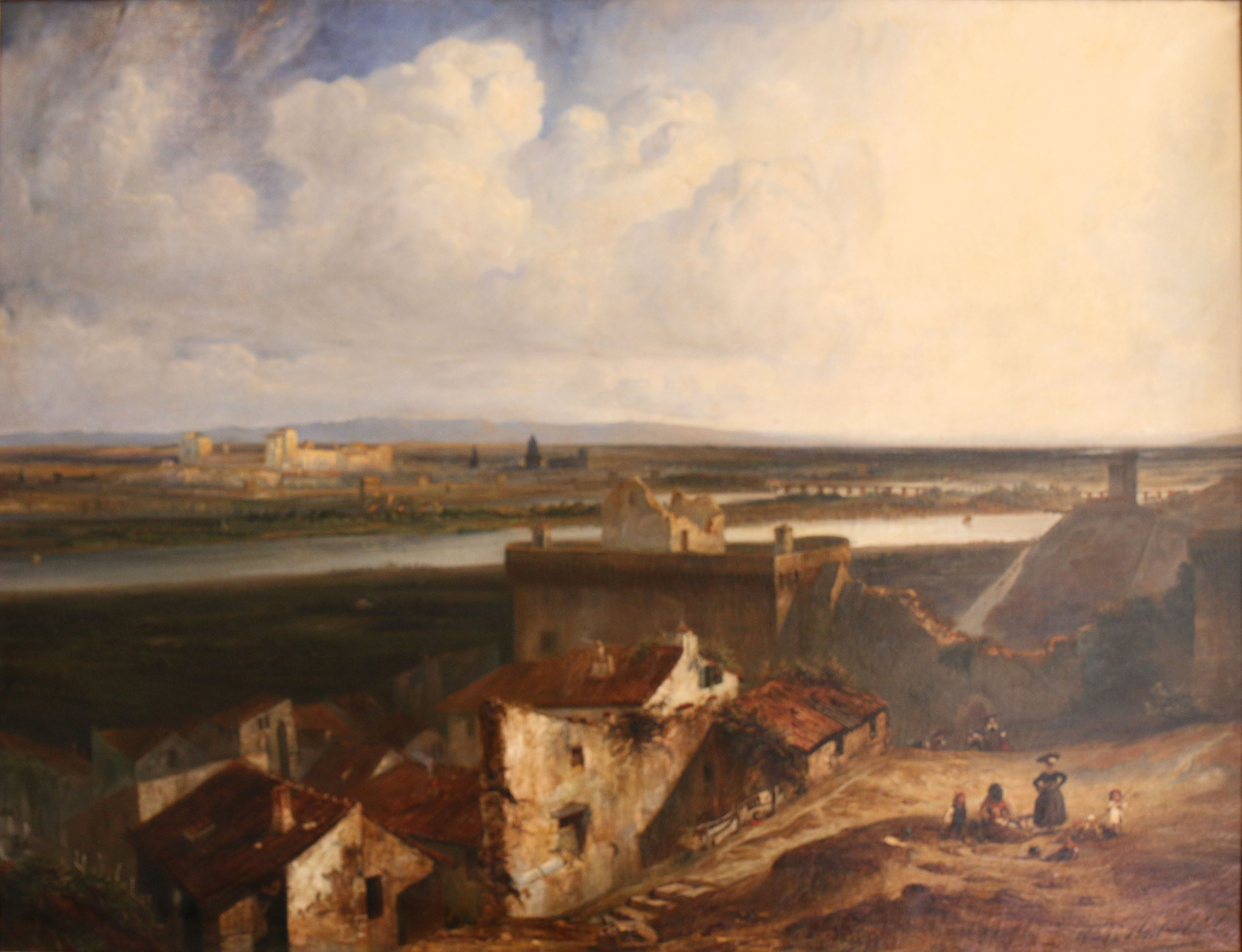
Paul Huet, General view of Avignon and Villeneuve-lès-Avignon from inside the fort Saint-André.

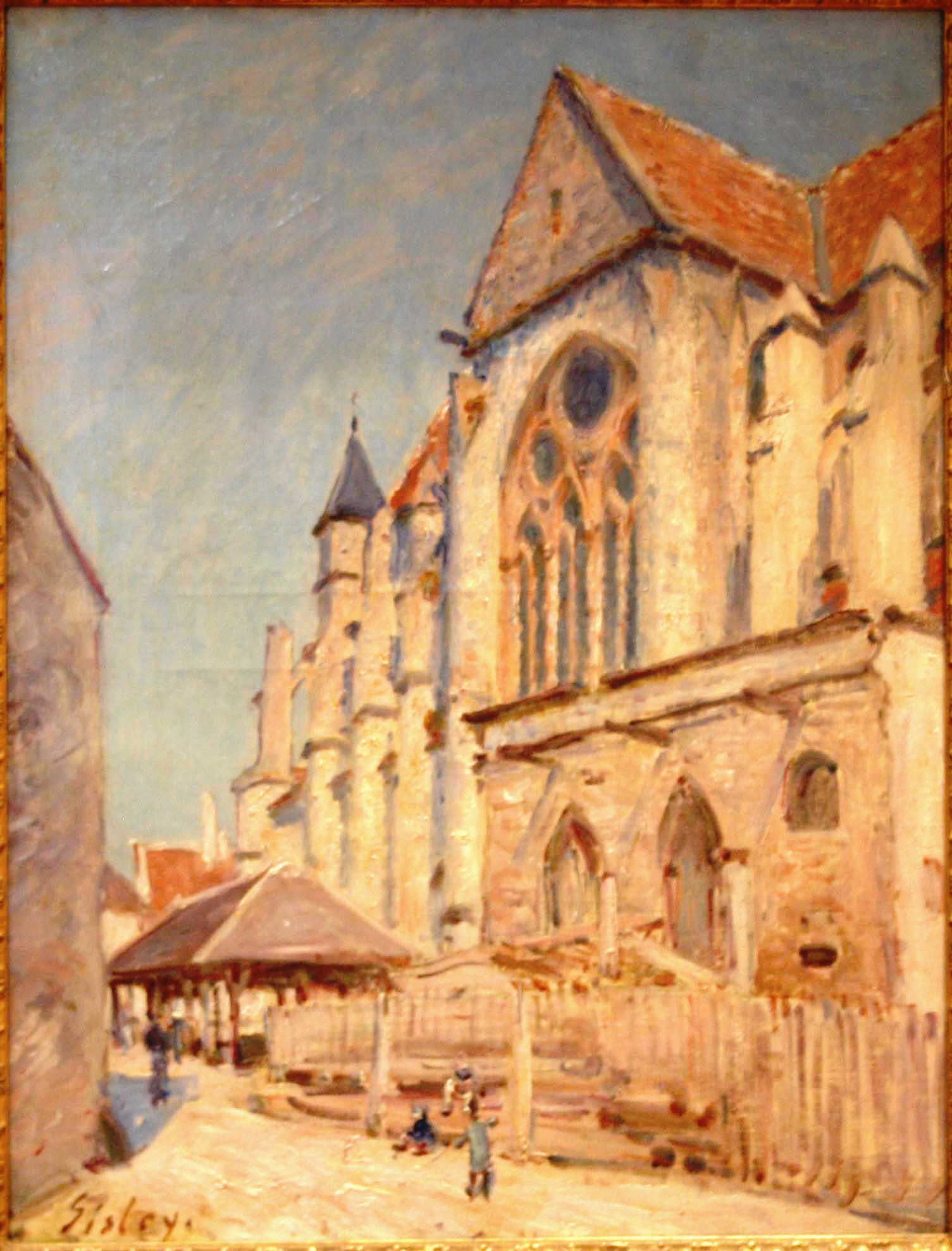
Alfred Sisley, The Church at Moret.

===== 20th century =====
- Émile Bernard : Portrait of Paul Léautaud.
- Pierre Bonnard : Winter Day.
- Chaïm Soutine : The Idiot; Bad Luck; The Stripe; View of a Village, Céret in Roussillon
- Bernard Buffet : Holy Face.
- Auguste Chabaud : Big Blue Bathing Woman; Les Arènes.
- Maurice Denis : Motherhood in White.
- George Desvallières : Portrait of Madame Emile Desvallières.
- Albert Gleizes : Motherhood; Riverbank.
- Alfred Lesbros : Street in Villeneuve-lès-Avignon; Footing.
- Louis Agricol Montagné : Portrait of Jules Belleudy in his Office.
- René Seyssaud : River in Autumn.
- Ibrahim Shahda : Woman in Black (La Femme en noir).
- Jules Valadon : Portrait of Joseph Rignault Aged Twenty.
- Louis-Mathieu Verdilhan : View of the Vieux-Port in Marseille.
- Maurice de Vlaminck : On Zinc.
- Joe Downing : Painting.
French - 20th century

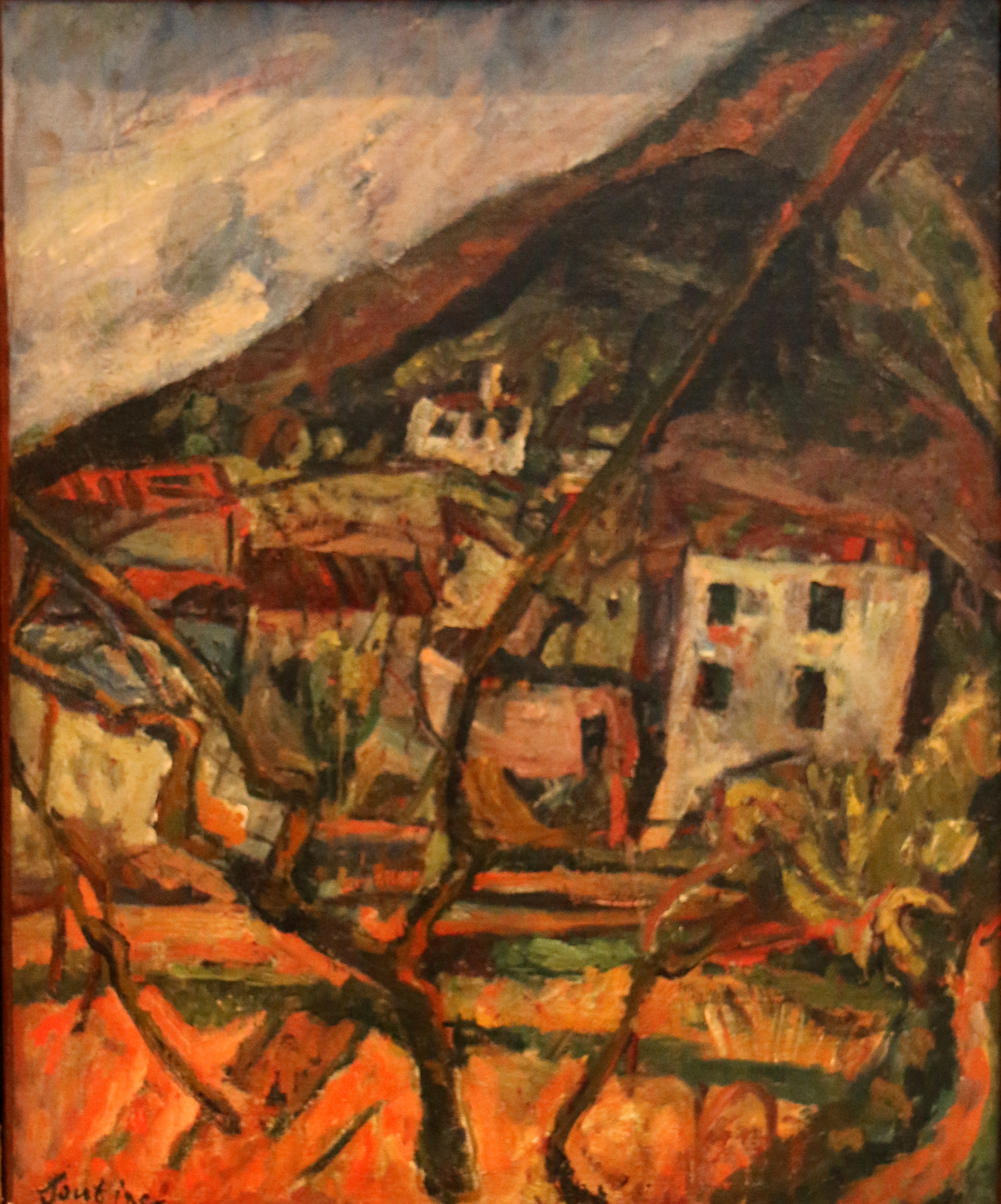
Chaïm Soutine, View of a Village, Céret in Roussillon.

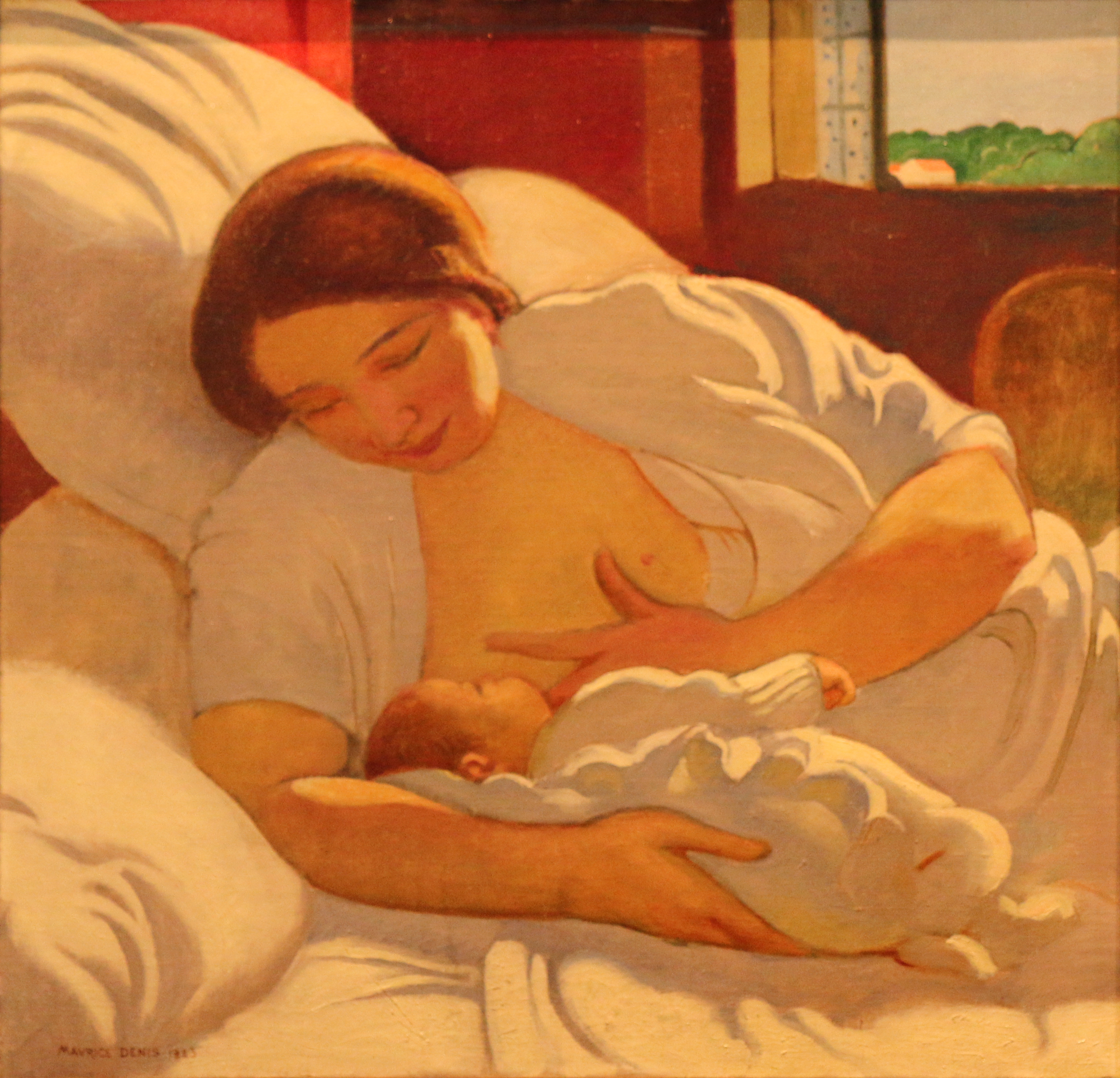
Maurice Denis, Motherhood in White.

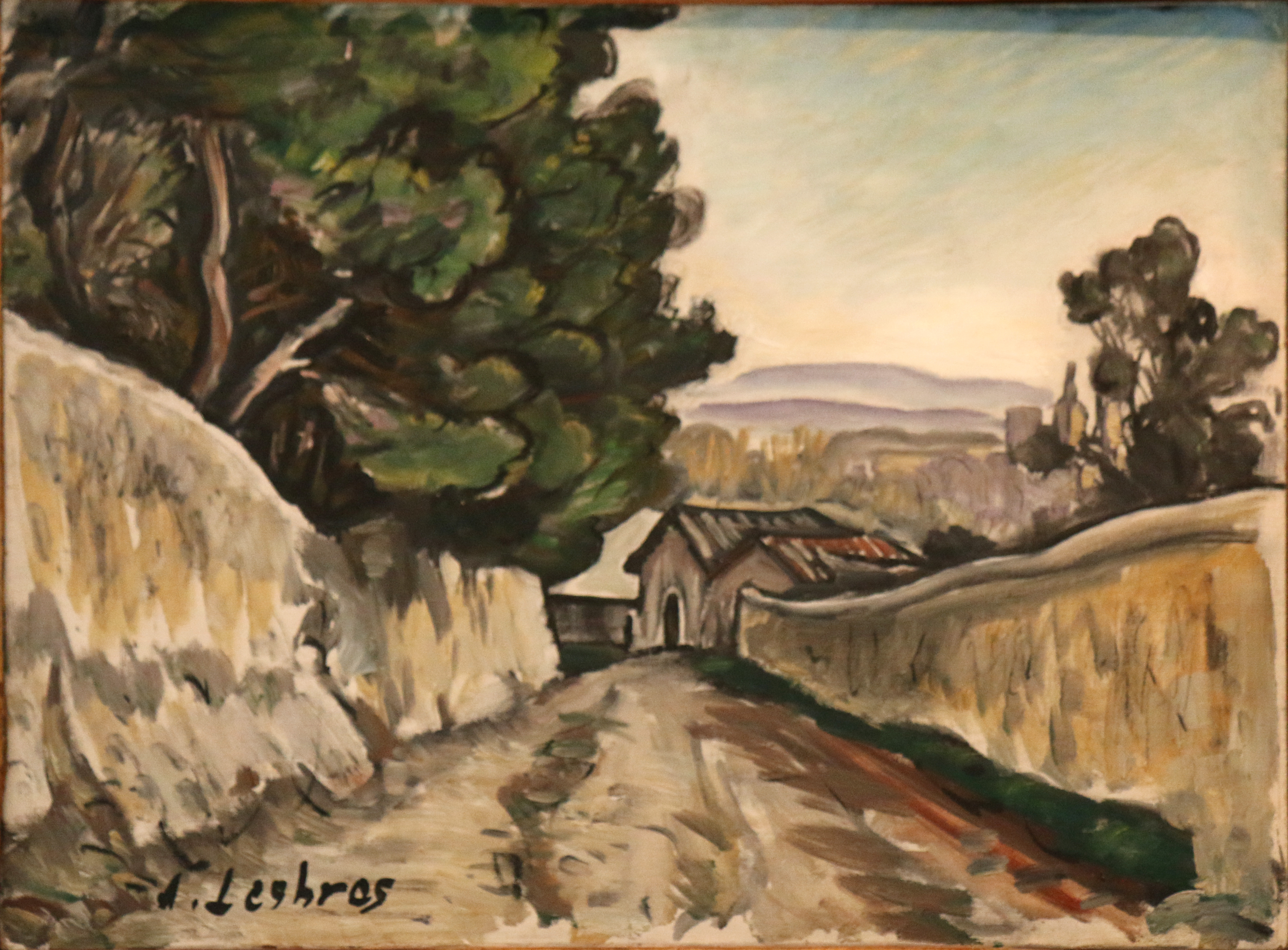
Alfred Lesbros, Street in Villeneuve-lès-Avignon.

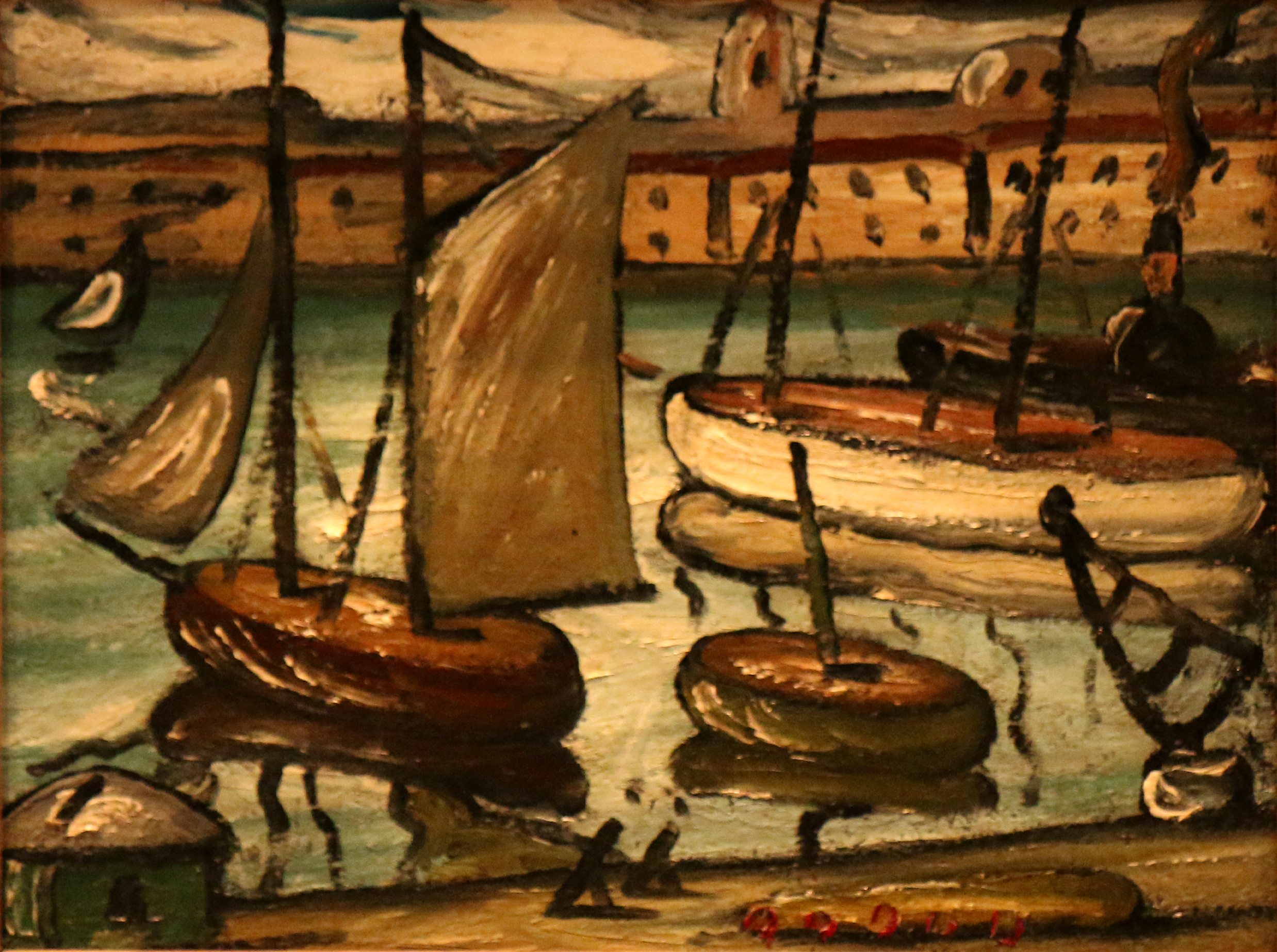
Louis-Mathieu Verdilhan, View of the Vieux-port in Marseille.

==== Italian ====
===== 16th and 17th centuries =====
- Filippo Abbiati : The Virgin Mary Appearing to the Bishops at the Council of Ephesus, sketch for a large painting for santa Maria del Carmine church in Milan.
- Paolo Biancucci : The Virgin Mary Presenting the Rosary to Saint Dominic, with Saints Catherine of Sienna, Antony of Padua and Francis of Assisi Adoring the Christ Child.
- Vincenzo Campi : Peasants' Meal
- Angelo Caroselli : Young Man with a Skull, Vanitas.
- Antoine Fort-Bras : The Painter's Easel
- Luca Giordano : The Death of Lucretia.
- Rutilio Manetti; Saint Jerome Supported by Angels.
- Giovanni Maria Morandi : Portrait of cardinal Marcello Durazzo.
- Pietro Negri : Nero and Agrippina.
- Salvator Rosa : Landscape with Two Figures.
- Giorgio Vasari : Abraham Meets Melchizedec.
- Pietro della Vecchia : Christ and the Woman Caught in Adultery.

===== 18th century =====
- Faustino Bocchi : Dwarf Playing the Violin.
- Domenico Brandi : A Deer Pursued by Dogs.
- Ercole Graziani le Jeune : Saint Peter Freed from Prison by an Angel.
- Giovanni Paolo Panini : The Vow of Marcus Curtius , Belisarius Begging for Alms.
- Francesco Zuccarelli : Landscape with Peasants.
Italian

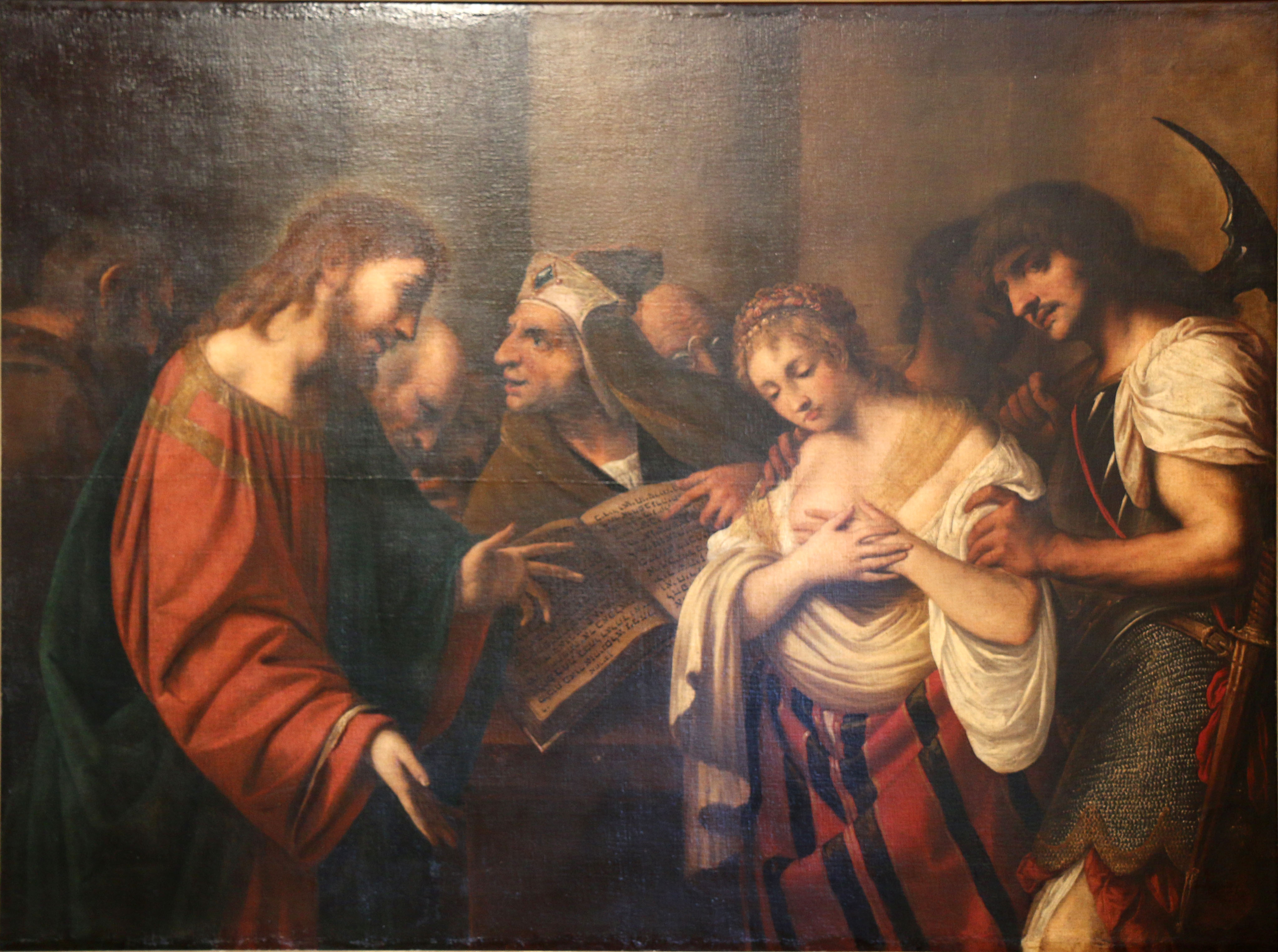
Pietro della Vecchia, Christ and the Woman Taken in Adultery.

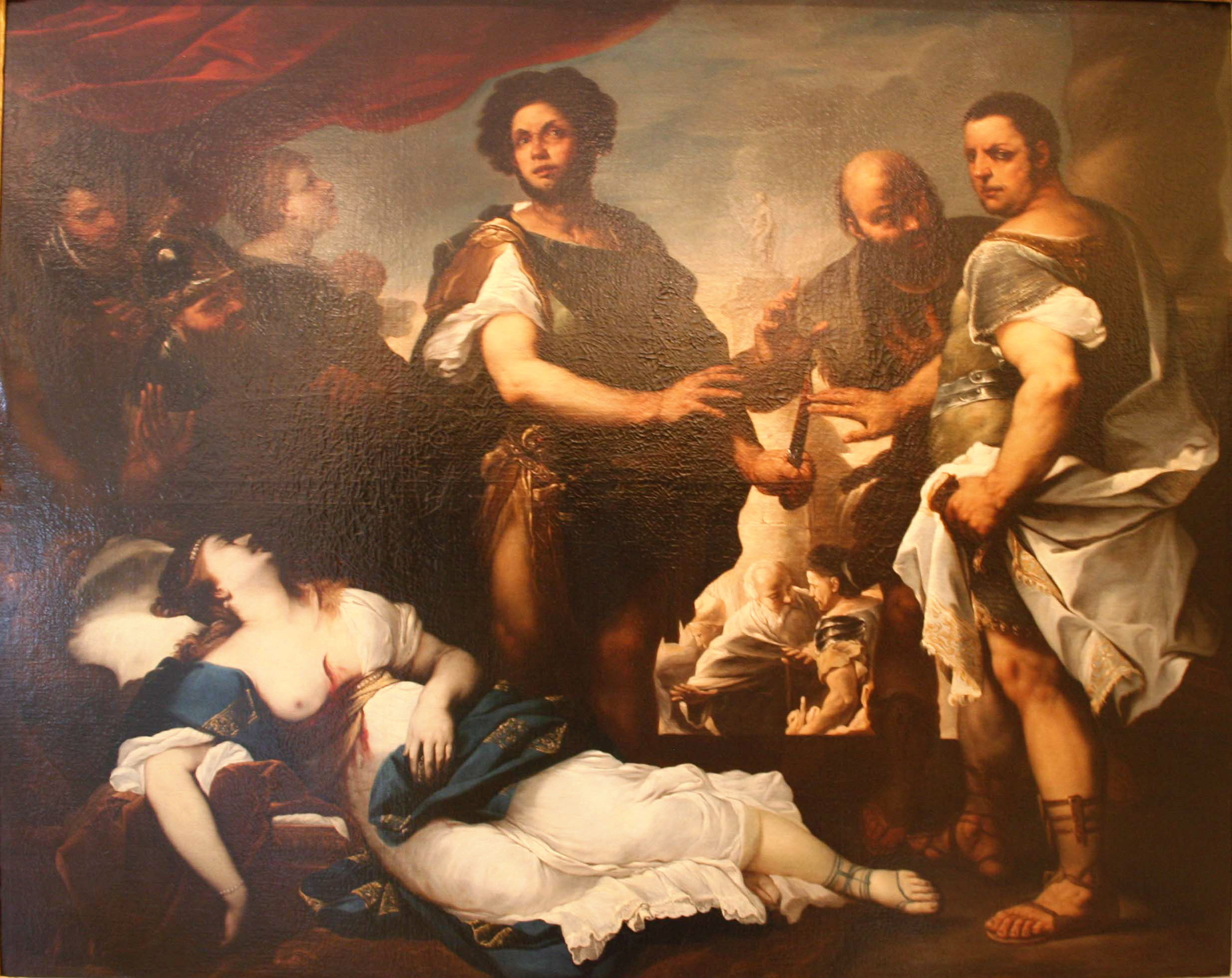
Luca Giordano, The Death of Lucretia.

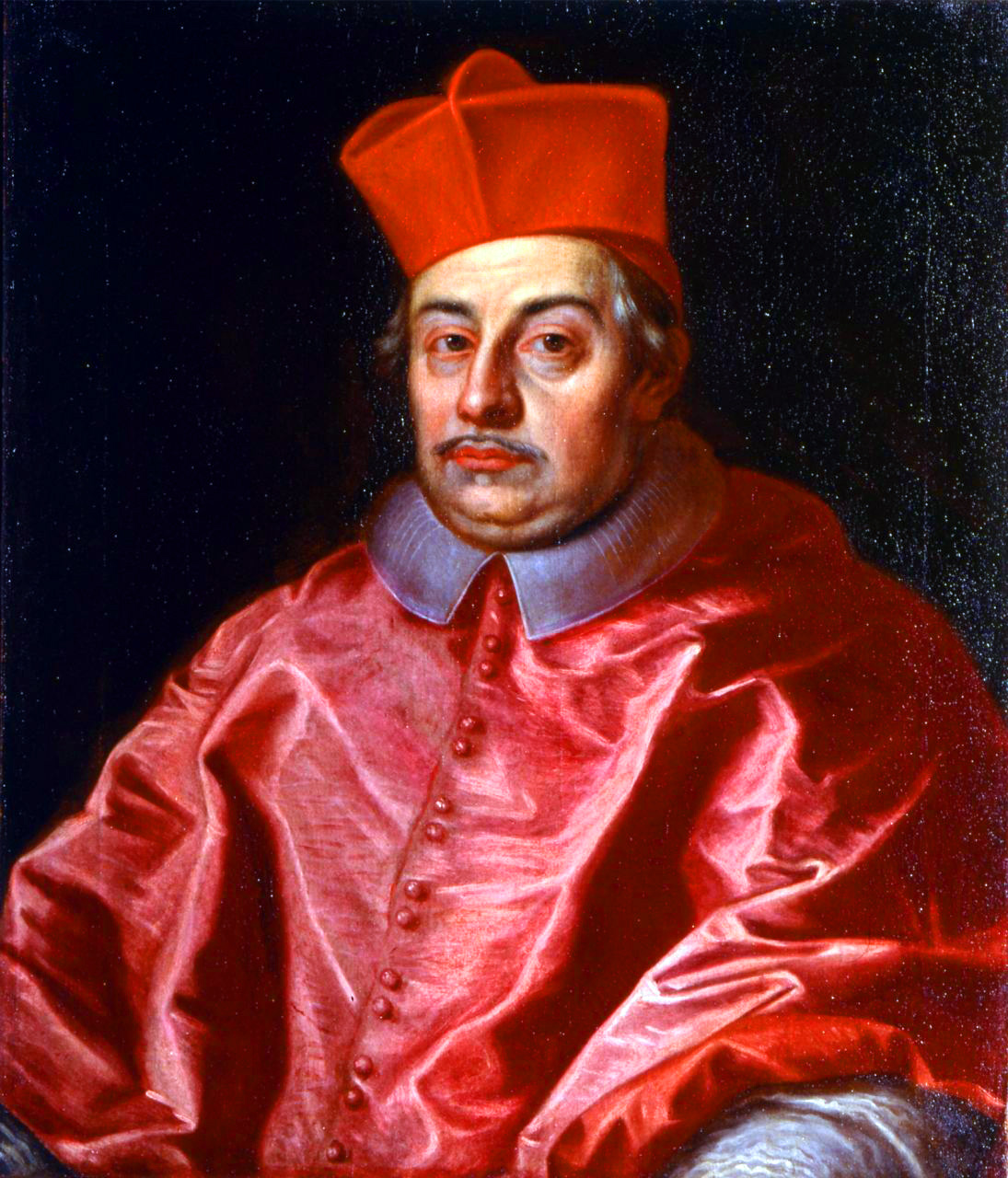
Giovanni Maria Morandi, Portrait of cardinal Marcello Durazzo.

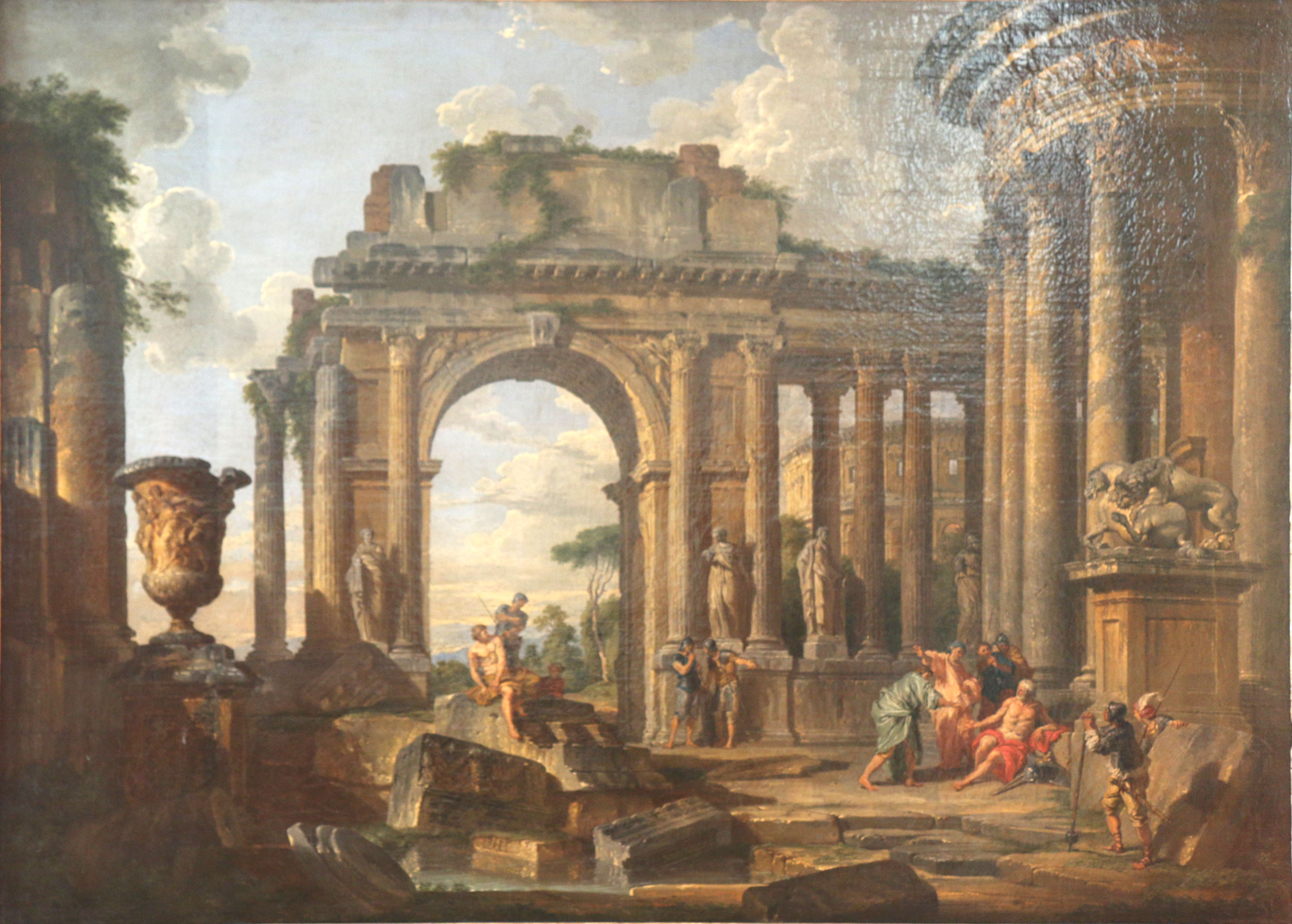
Giovanni Paolo Panini, Belisarius Begging for Alms.

==== Spanish ====
- Luis de Morales : Ecce Homo.

==== Northern Europe ====
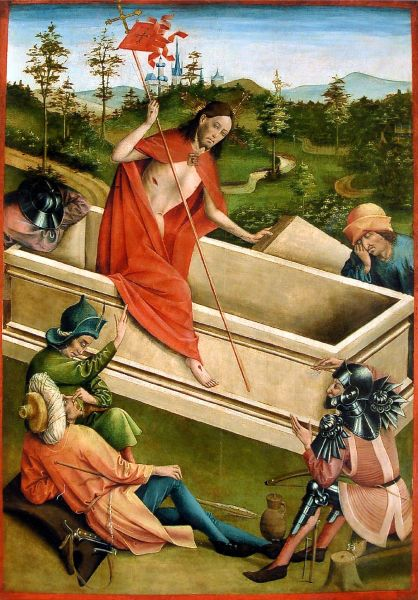
Johann Koerbecke, Resurrection (1457).

- Johann Koerbecke : Resurrection, 1457, a rare panel from a broken-up retable originally in Marienfeld Abbey.
- Germany (15th century) : Crucified Martyrs; Martyrs Whipped and Wearing Crowns of Thorns.
- Jan Frans van Bloemen : Landscape with Bathers; Landscape with Goatherds.
- Pieter Bout : Busy River Landscape.
- Salomon de Bray : Saint Peter Delivered from Prison.
- Joos van Craesbeeck : The Smoker and Death.
- After Albrecht Dürer : Christ Bearing the Cross.
- Cornelis Dusart : Seated Pipe-Smoker.
- After Jan Brueghel the Elder : Procession at a Peasant Wedding.
- Pieter Brueghel the Younger (studio) : Village Festival or Kermesse with a Play and a Procession
- Pieter Brueghel the Younger, The Parable of the Misers.
- Attributed to Jacob van Oost the Elder : Portrait of a Young Man.
- Attributed to Lucas Franchoys the Younger : Portrait of a Churchman.
- Pieter Hardimé : Flower Bouquet in a Vase on a Stone Ledge.
- Gerard Hoet : Armida Preparing to Pursue Rinaldo.
- Abraham Hondius : Dogs Attacking a Heron.
- Gérard de Lairesse : Jaël and Sisera.
- Anthonie de Lorme (architecture) and Anthonie Palamedesz. (figures) : Protestant Church Interior with Figures.
- Jan Miel : Shepherds and Their Flock in a Mountainous Landscape
- Jan Miense Molenaer : The Foot Operation.
- Michiel van Musscher : A Lute Lesson Interrupted.
- Eglon van der Neer : Portrait of a Man in Louis XIV Costume.
- Aernout van der Neer : View of a Village by Moonlight.
- Cornelis van Poelenburgh : Landscape with Mercury Sending Argus to Sleep with his Flute.
- Chistiaan van Pol; Study of a Lilac Branch; Study of a Variegated Rose Stalk.
- Hendrik van Steenwijk II : Church Interior with Figures, oil on copper
- Dominicus van Tol : Monk Reading with a Pen in his Hand.
- Jan van de Venne : Two Fantasy Heads, Profile.
- Jan Peeter Verdussen : The Blacksmith's Home.
- Jan Weenix : Child and Dog at a Window, Trompe-l’œil.
- Matthijs Wulfraet : Two Smokers.
Northern Europe

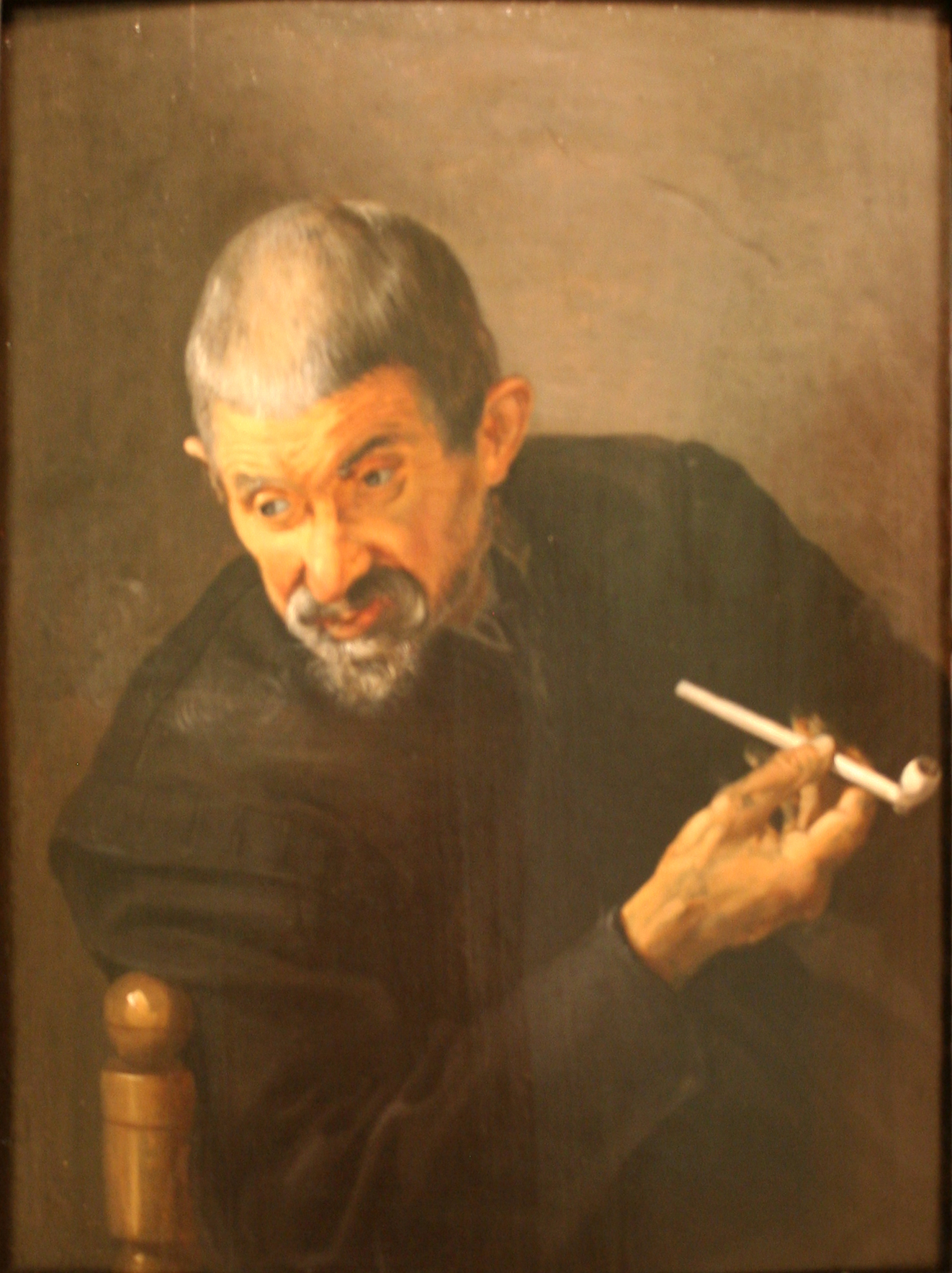
Cornelis Dusart, Seated Pipe-Smoker.

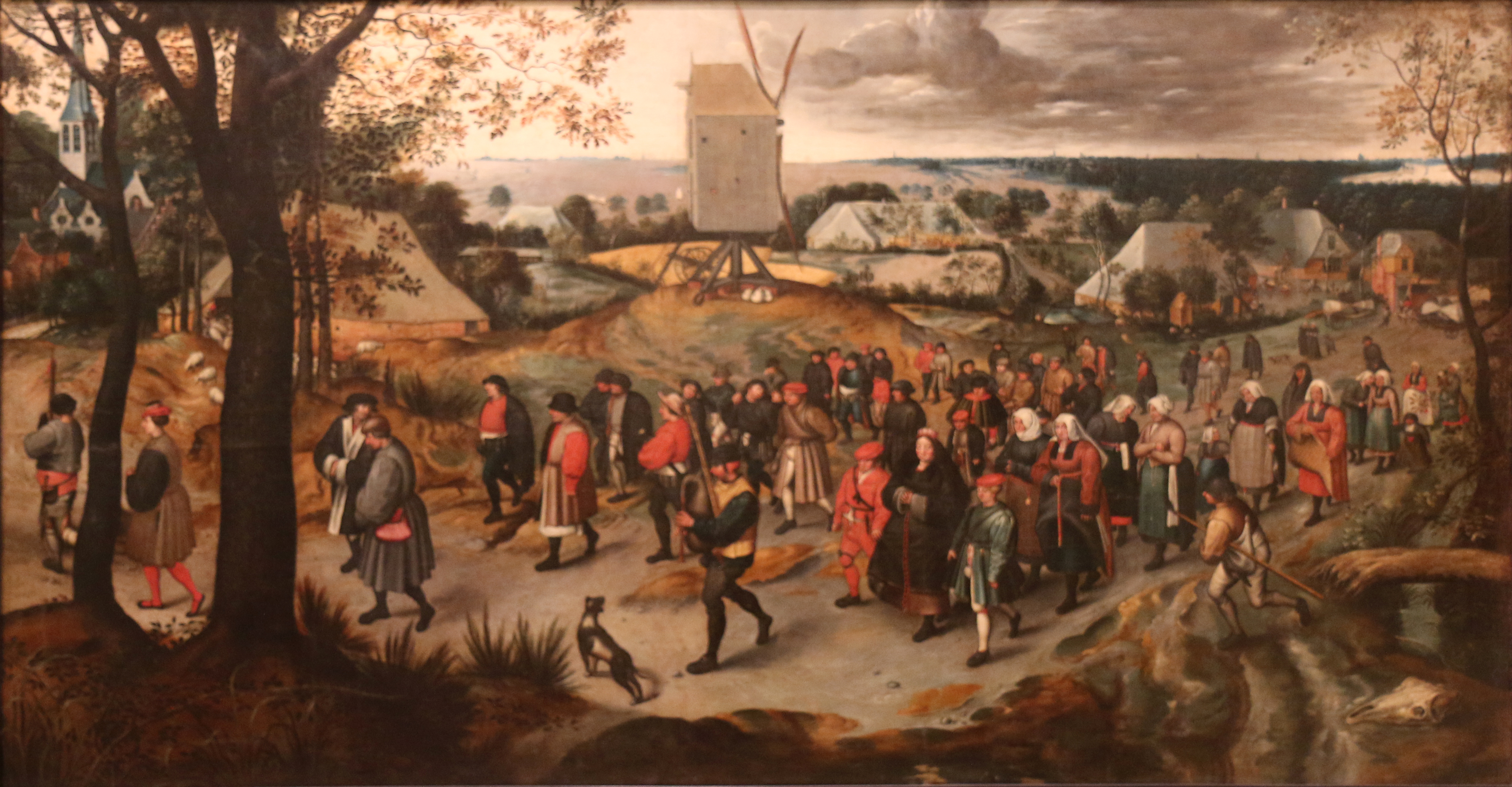
After Jan Brueghel the Elder, Procession at a Peasant Wedding.

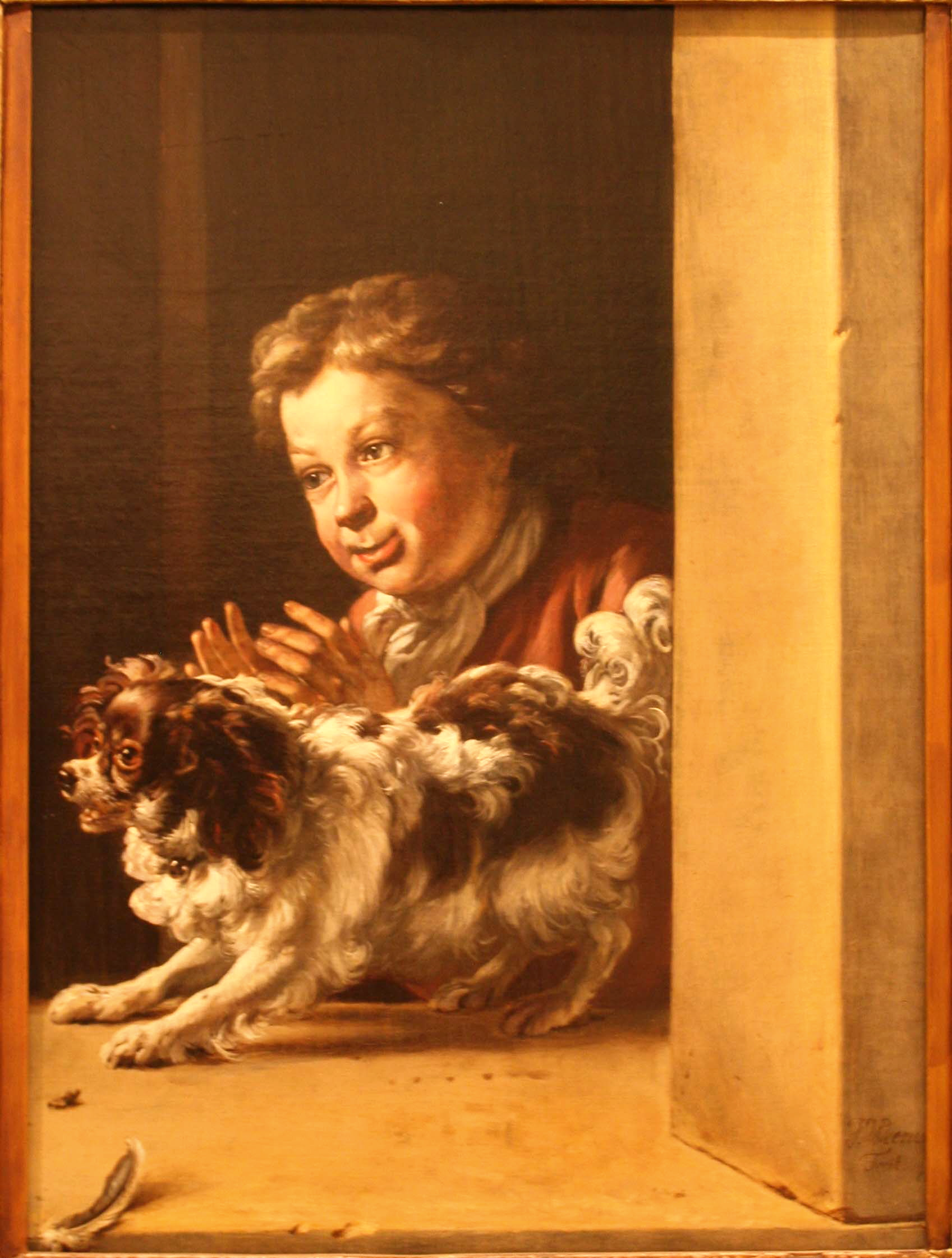
Jan Weenix, Child and Dog at a Window, Trompe-l’œil.

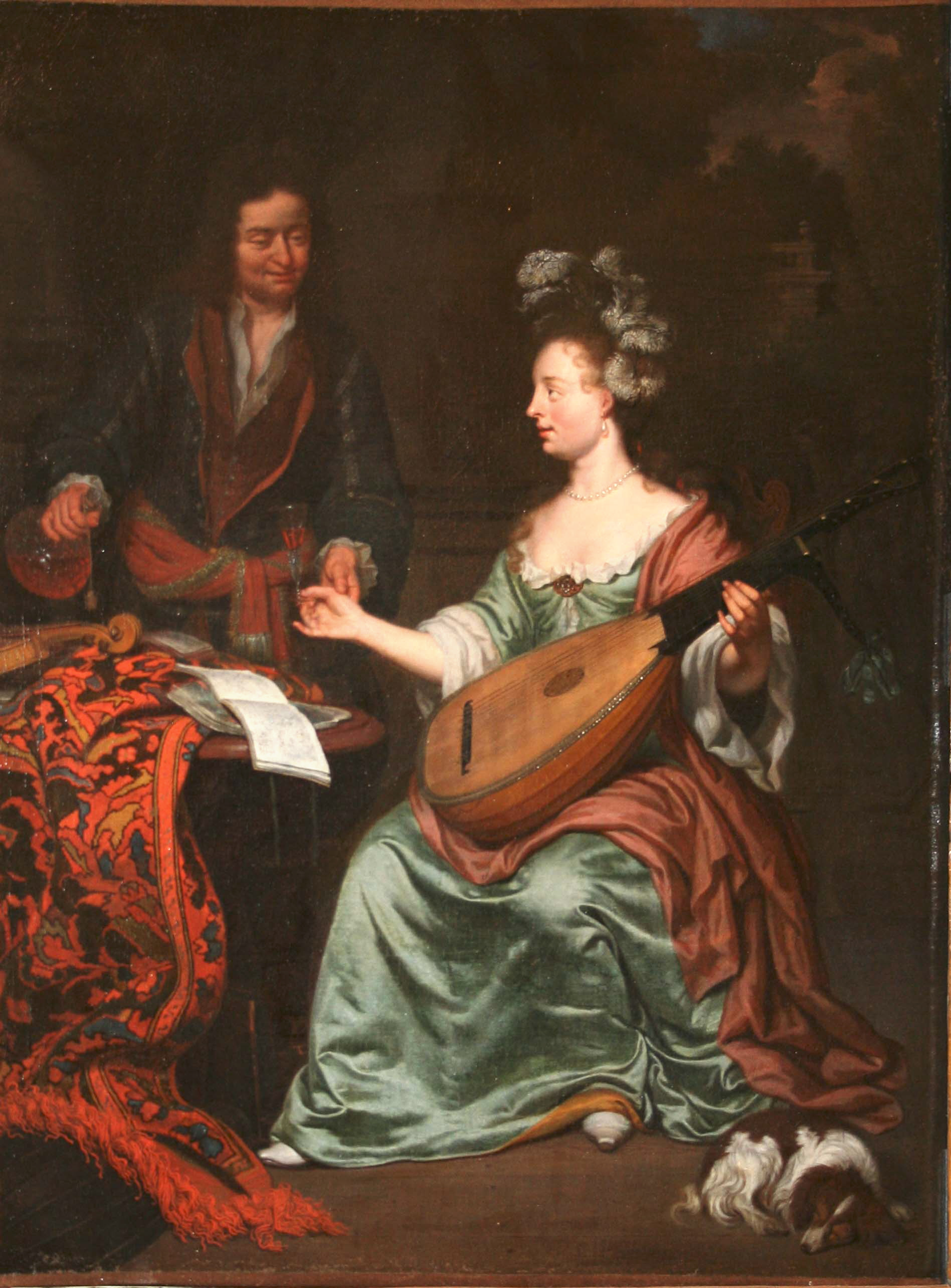
Michiel van Musscher, A Lute Lesson Interrupted.

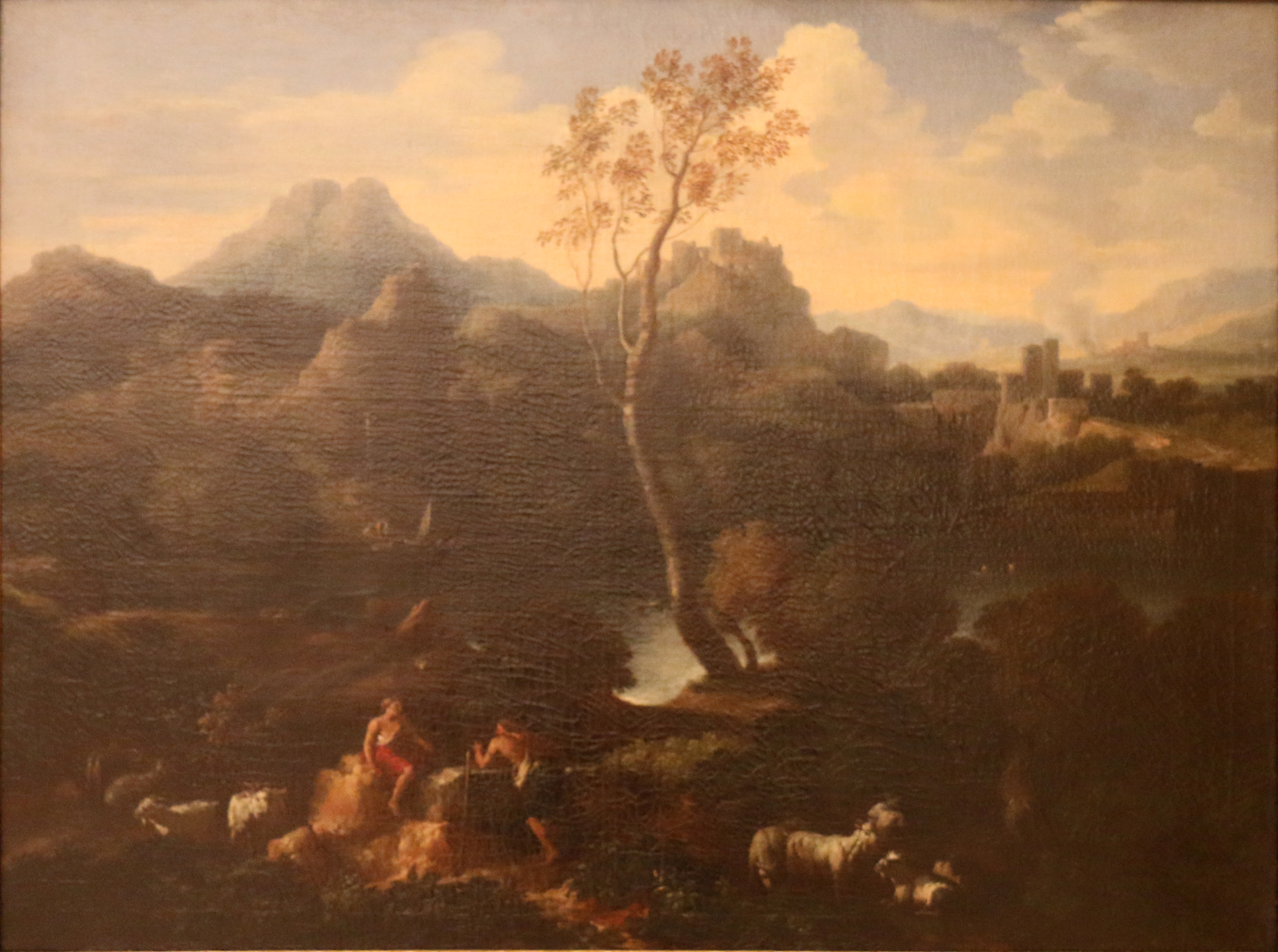
Jan Frans van Bloemen, Landscape with Goatherds.

=== Sculpture ===
==== French ====
===== 15th to 18th century =====
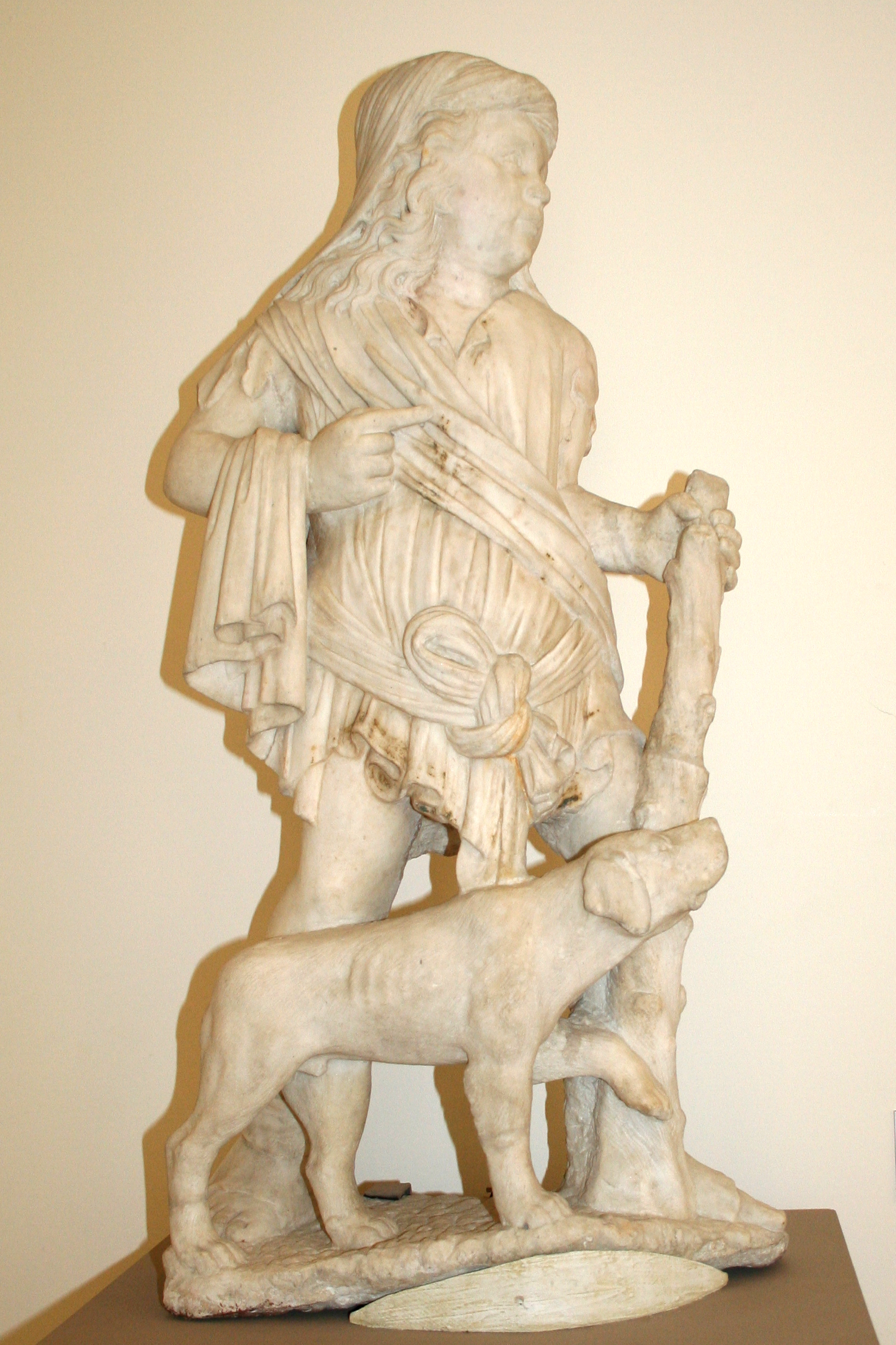
Child with a Dog, French, 16th century, marble.

- Virgin of Pity, stone with traces of paint.
- Child with a Dog, white marble with traces of paint
- Tomb of La Palice : alabaster representations of Wisdom, Justice and Strength from the tomb of Jacques II de Chabannes de La Palice, recovered from his castle chapel after the tomb's destruction in the French Revolution; the representation of the fourth cardinal virtue, Temperance, is lost
- Jean-Baptiste Guillermin : Christ on the Cross with a Skull, elephant ivory crucifix from the chapel of the black penitents in Avignon.

===== 19th century =====
- Francisque Joseph Duret : Orestes, carrara marble bust
- Victor-Étienne Simyan : Etruscan Art, marble with traces of bronzing.
- Camille Claudel : Paul Claudel as a Young Roman, bronze.
- Noël Ruffier : Joseph Bara and Augustin-Agricol Viala, two marble replicas of the busts at the La Flèche military academy.
- Joseph Brian : The Death of Cato Utica, plaster.
- Louis Veray : Sleeping Harvester, marble.
- James Pradier : Cassandra Taking Refuge at the Foot of the Altar, marble.
- Jean-Joseph Espercieux : Greek Woman Preparing to get into a Bath, marble.
- Jules Cavelier : The Novice, marble.
- Jean-Louis Brian : Mercury, plaster; Faun, marble
French - 19th century

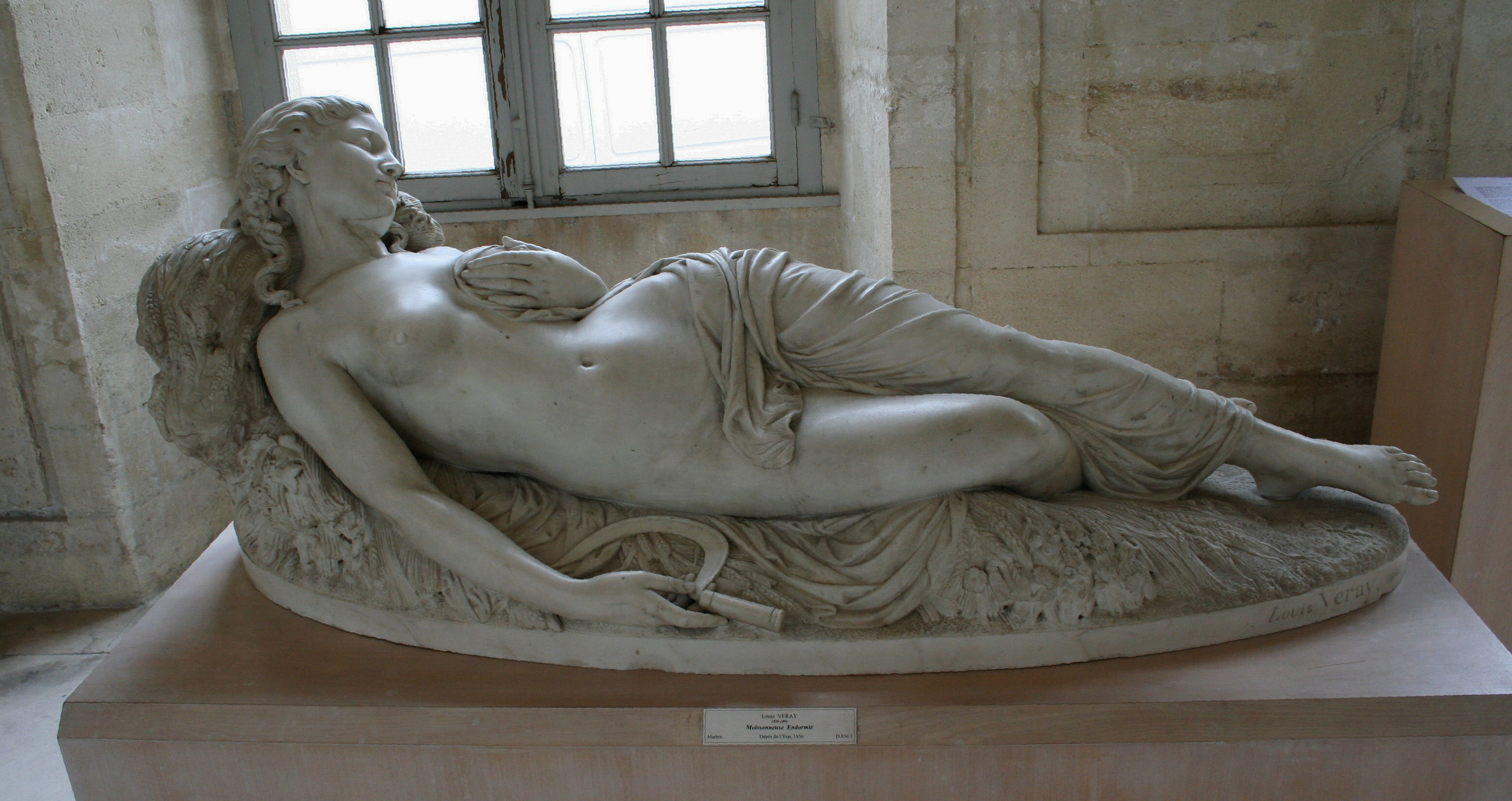
Louis Veray, Sleeping Harvester.

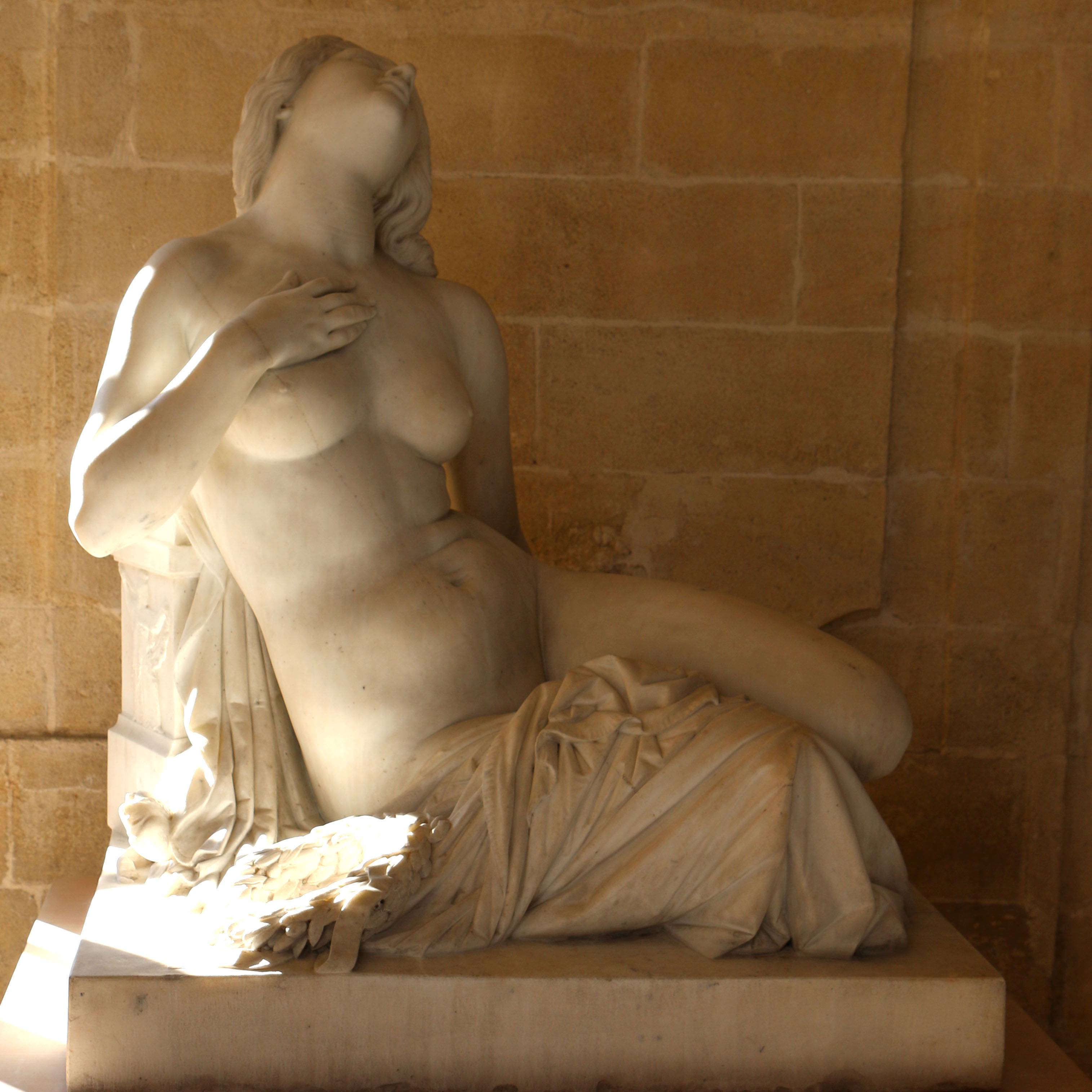
James Pradier, Cassandra Taking Refuge at the Foot of the Altar.

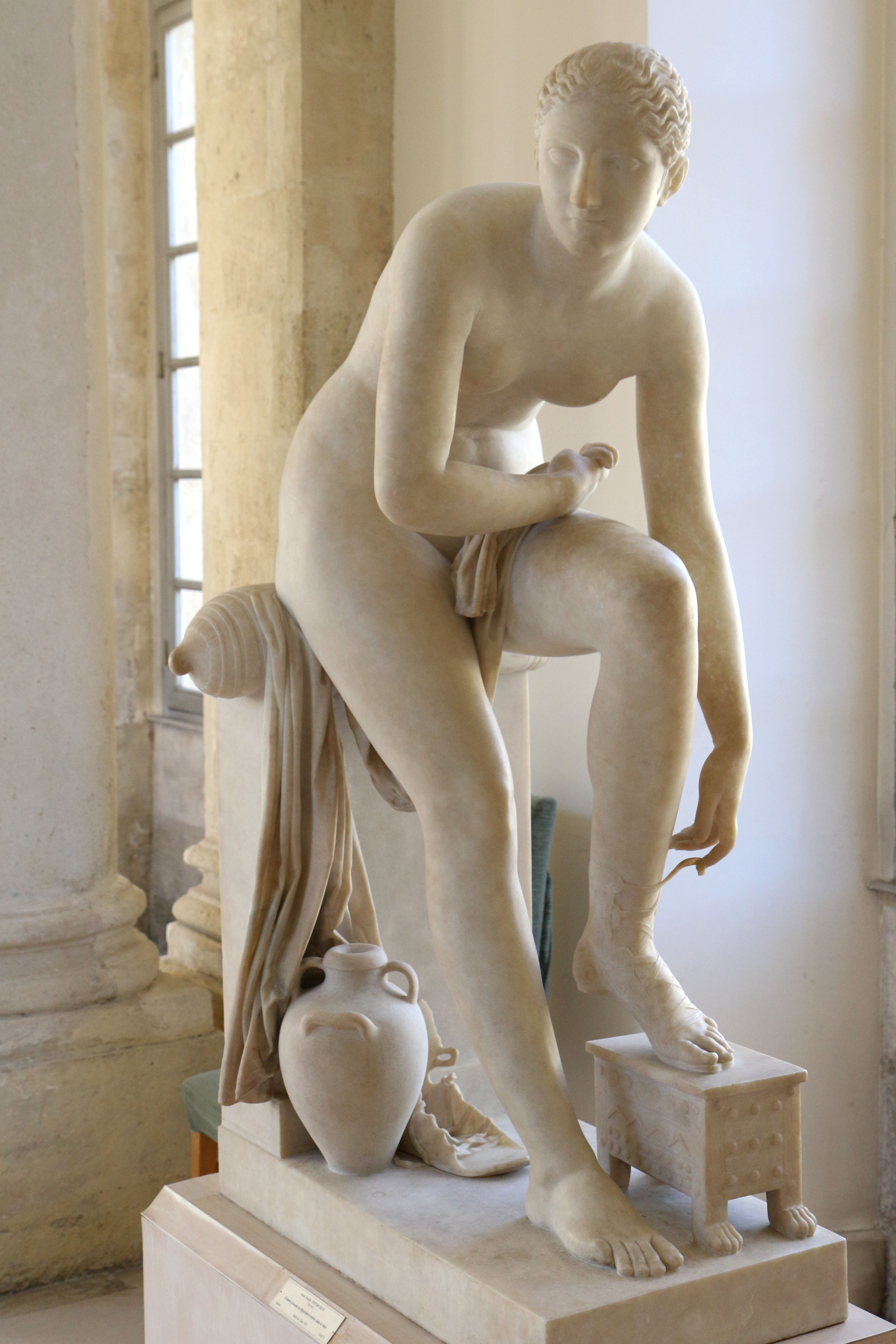
Jean-Joseph Espercieux, Greek Woman Preparing to get into a Bath.

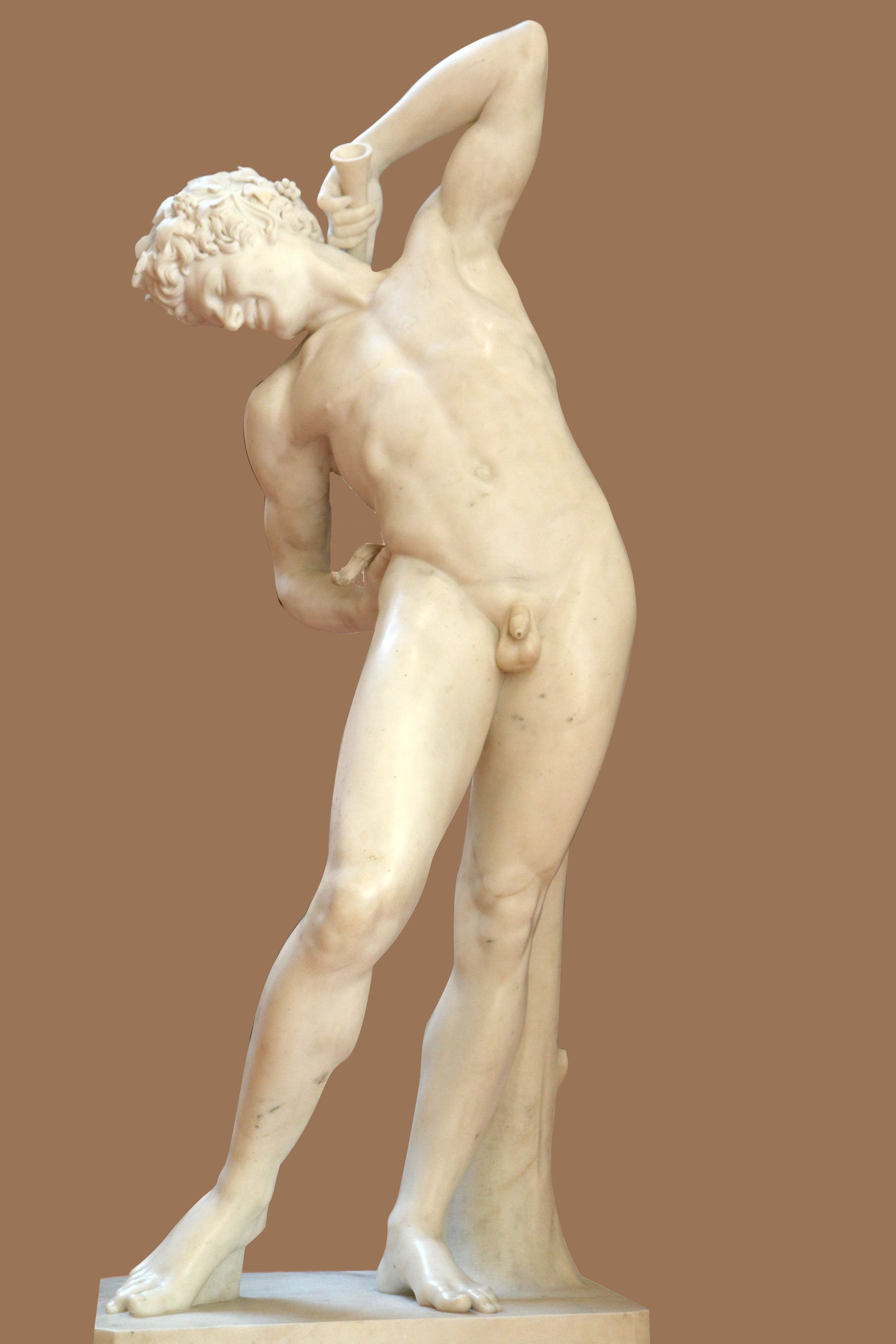
Jean-Louis Brian, Faun (1841).

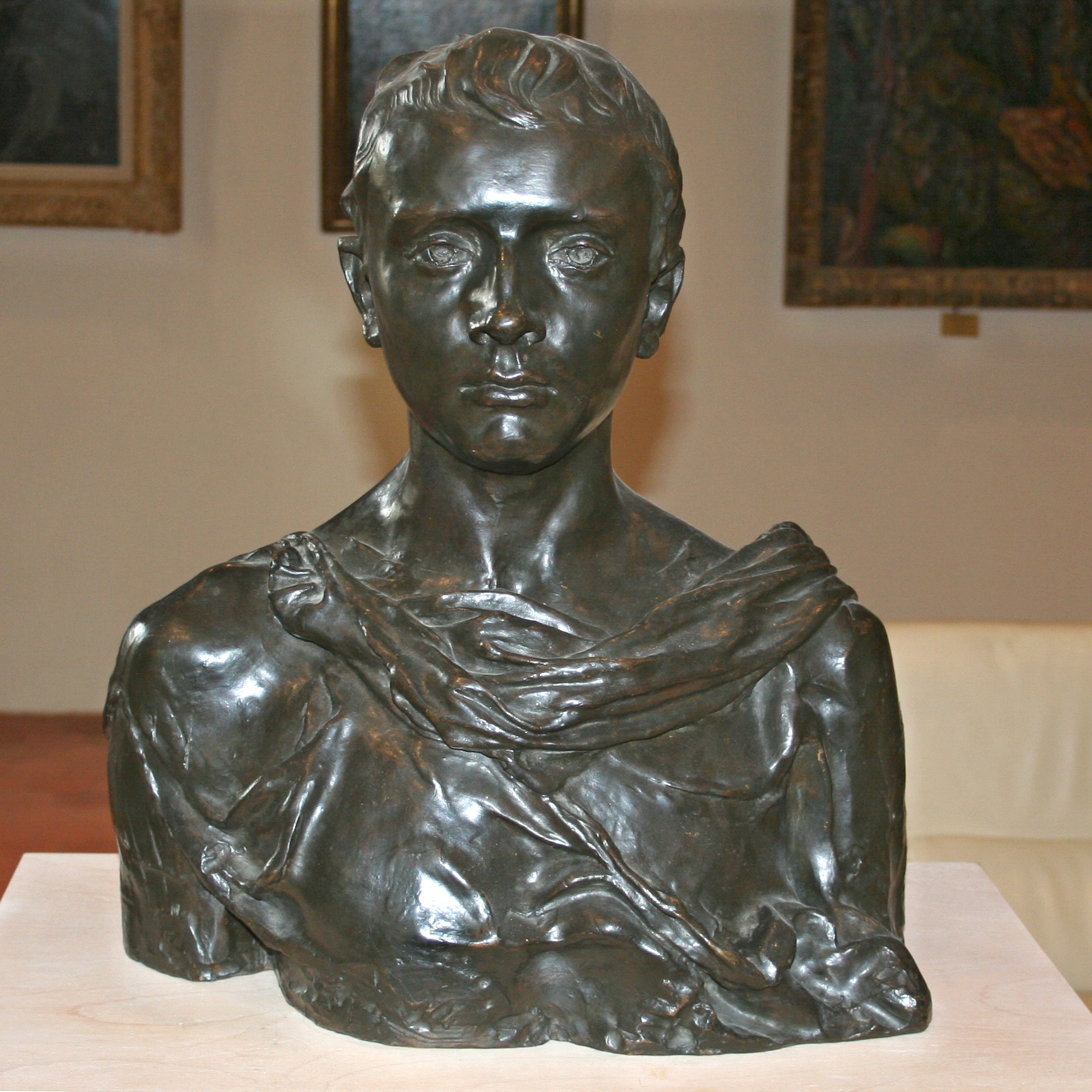
Camille Claudel, Paul Claudel as a Young Roman.

==== Northern Europe ====
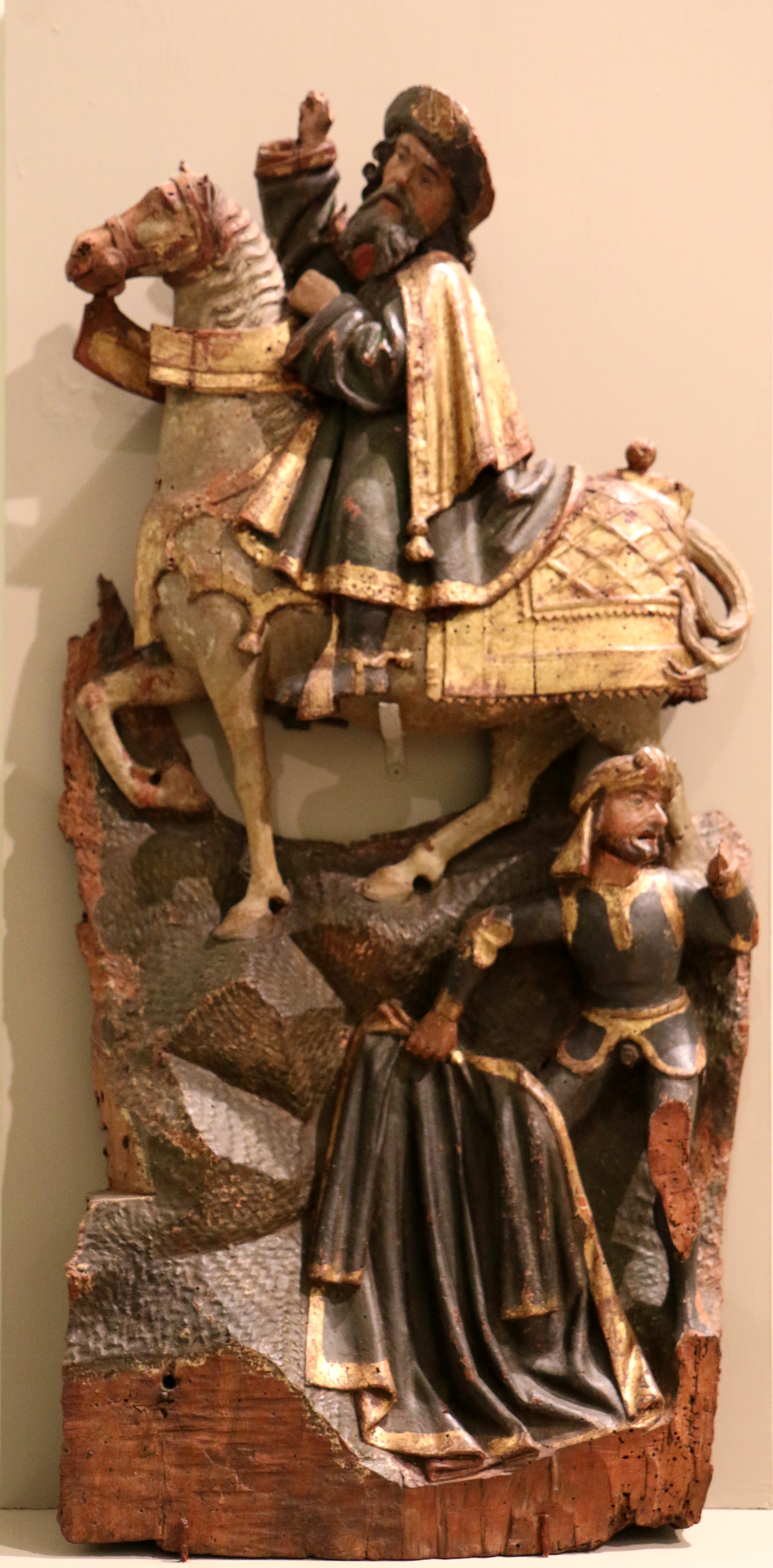
North European School, early 16th century, Officer and Roman soldier

- Anonymous, Officer and Roman soldier, early 16th century, high-relief in painted and gilded black walnut, probably from an altarpiece of the crucifixion
- Anonymous, Saint Michael Killing a Dragon, gilded and painted limewood

==== Italian ====
- Francesco Laurana, Bust of a Child, marble with traces of paint and gilding.
- Pietro Torrigiano : Head of Christ as Saviour of the World, bronze.
- Anonymous, Ambling Horse, bronze with brown patina

=== Prints and Drawings ===
It includes leaves by artists from most of the French and Italian schools as well as a smaller number of Spanish and North European works. Northern artists in the collection include Hendrik Goltzius, Jan van Goyen and Raphael Mengs, whilst Spanish ones include Vincenzo Carducci and Juan de Valdés Leal.

French artists represented include Le Lorrain, Eustache Le Sueur, Antoine Watteau, François Boucher, Charles-Joseph Natoire, Jean-Marc Nattier, Auguste Rodin, Honoré Daumier, Jean-François Millet, Eugène Boudin, Henri de Toulouse-Lautrec, Armand Guillaumin, Berthe Morisot, Paul Cézanne, Auguste Renoir, Alfred Sisley, Henri-Edmond Cross, Édouard Vuillard, Georges Rouault, Albert Marquet, Marc Chagall, André Lhote, Léonard Foujita and Jean Fautrier.

Italian artists include Domenico Beccafumi, Lorenzo Lotto, Baccio Bandinelli, Daniele da Volterra, Il Romanino, Paolo Veronese, Tintoretto, Jacopo Zucchi, Taddeo Zuccaro, Il Garofalo, Agostino Carracci, Federico Barocci, Mattia Preti, Luca Giordano, Domenico Fetti, Guercino, Alessandro Algardi, Luigi Garzi, Francesco Furini, Pier Francesco Mola, Daniele Crespi, Giovanni Niccolò Servandoni and Amedeo Modigliani.

=== Tapestries and furniture ===
This part of the collection includes:

- David and Bathsheba, tapestry, Flemish, early 16th century, wool and silk with gold and silver thread
- Chest with allegories of the Three Theological Virtues (Faith, Hope, Charity) and the Four Cardinal Virtues (Strength, Justice, Wisdom, Temperance), northern French, early 16th century walnut, oak and cherrywood.

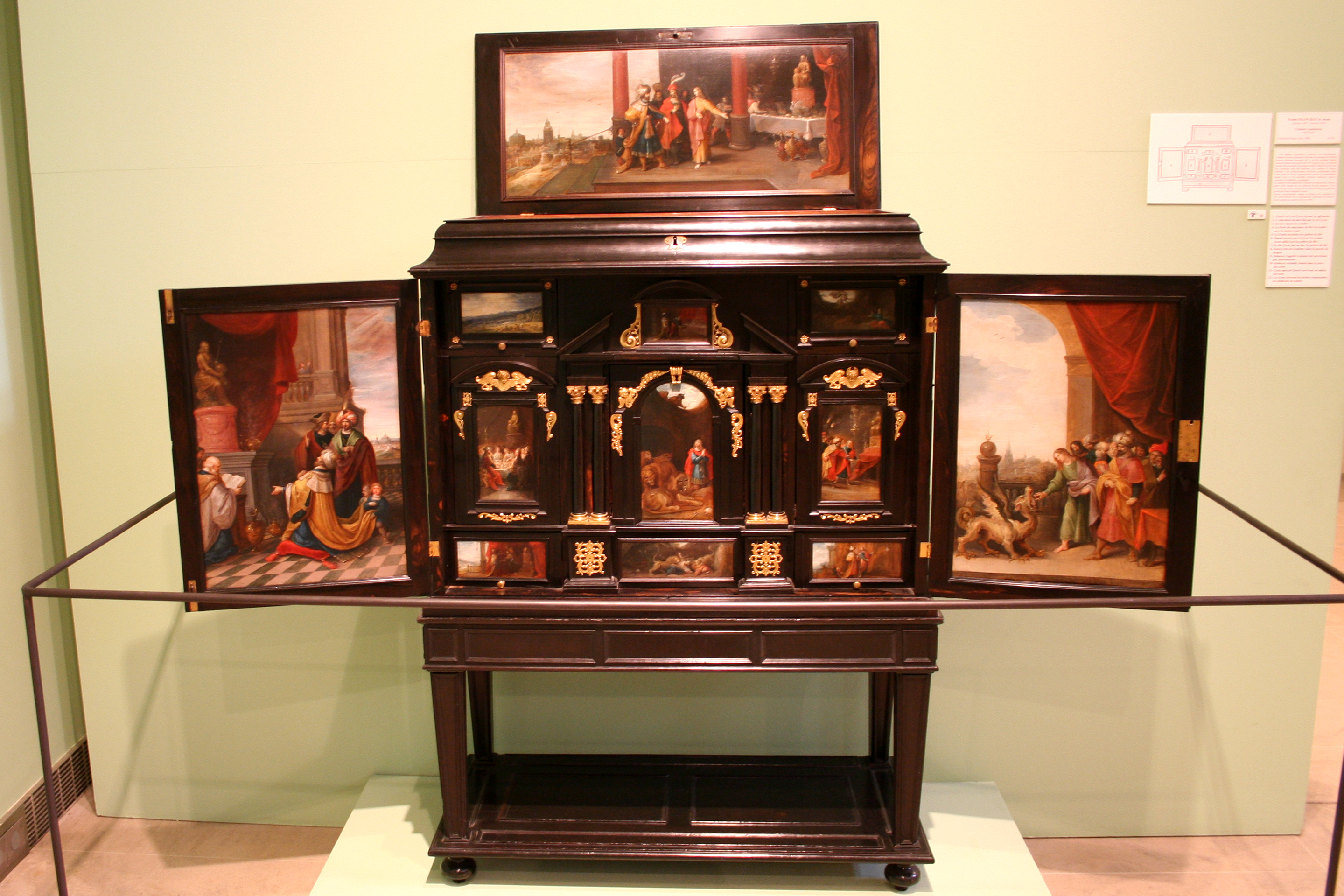
Frans II Francken, cabinet, after 1620).

- Cabinet of curiosities with twelve medallions of the life of the prophet Daniel from the Book of Daniel, painted by Frans II Francken, dated 1620 on its reverse, from the Puech collection.

Key : 1- Daniel and King Cyrus Before those Sacrificing 2- Cyrus Adores the God Bel 3- Daniel Spreading Ashes 4- The Gate of Bel's Sanctuary Sealed by Royal Decree 5- Night Ceremonies by the Priests of Bel 6- Daniel Revealing the Priests' Secret Ceremonies to King Cyrus 7- King Cyrus Arresting the Priests of Bel 8- Daniel Throws Balls into the Dragon's Mouth 9- Habakkuk Preparing to give Provisions to the Harvesters 10- Habakkuk Rescuing Daniel from the Lions' Den 11- Cyrus Sees Daniel Safe in the Lions' Den 12- The Lions Devouring Daniel's Tormentors

=== Egyptian archaeology ===
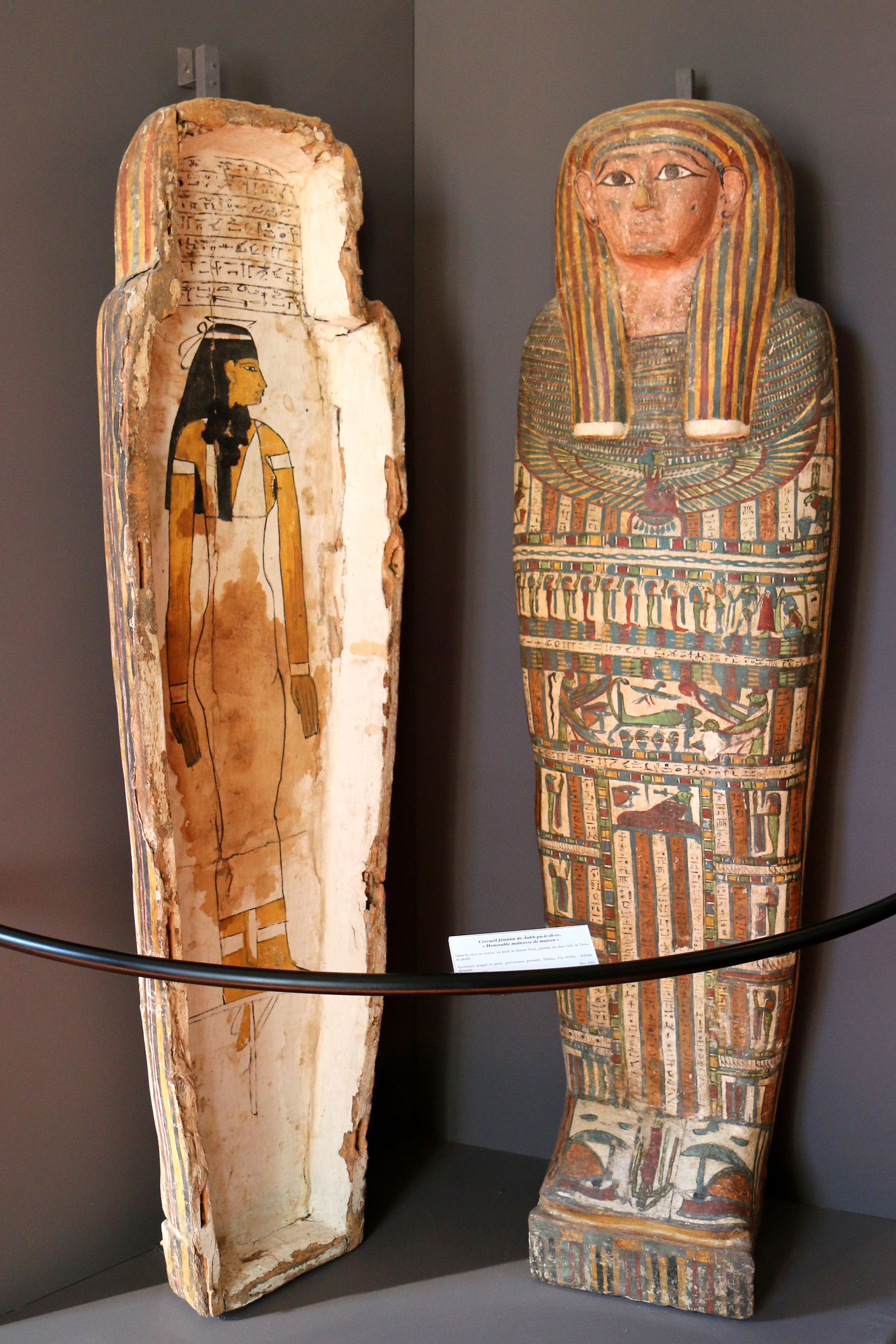
Sarcophagus of Ânk-pa-in-di-is (23rd Dynasty).

The Egyptian section consists of Esprit Calvet's collection along with that of Marius Clément from Marseille and other purchases, including:

- sycamore anthropoid sarcophagus of Ânkh-pa-in-di-is (honourable mistress of the house), with paint and plaster, probably from Thebes, 23rd Dynasty. Its interior shows the goddess Nut as a Libyan-featured woman in profile in a long flowing tunic and a wig;
- alabaster canopic jar in the form of a head of Amset, with the name of Iahmès, 26th Dynasty;
- a family ex-voto of Yaï (director of the shipyards), carved with images of the dead man and members of his family such as his wife (singer to the god Sobek), 13th Dynasty;
- limestone offering table of Harsiési and Pa-di-Mout, probably from Abydos, 26th Dynasty, Sait period;
- ochre stone hemispherical medallion of the head of Ammon with hair bound by a band and decorated all over with flowers or vines, 1st century CE, Gallo-Roman, discovered at Caderousse and offered to Calvet by the Christian Doctrine Fathers (he was their doctor until the congregation was dispersed);
- stela raised by Setaou, viceroy of Nubia, Ramses II, with a funerary cult scene at the top with Osiris and his sisters Isis and Nephtys.
Egypt

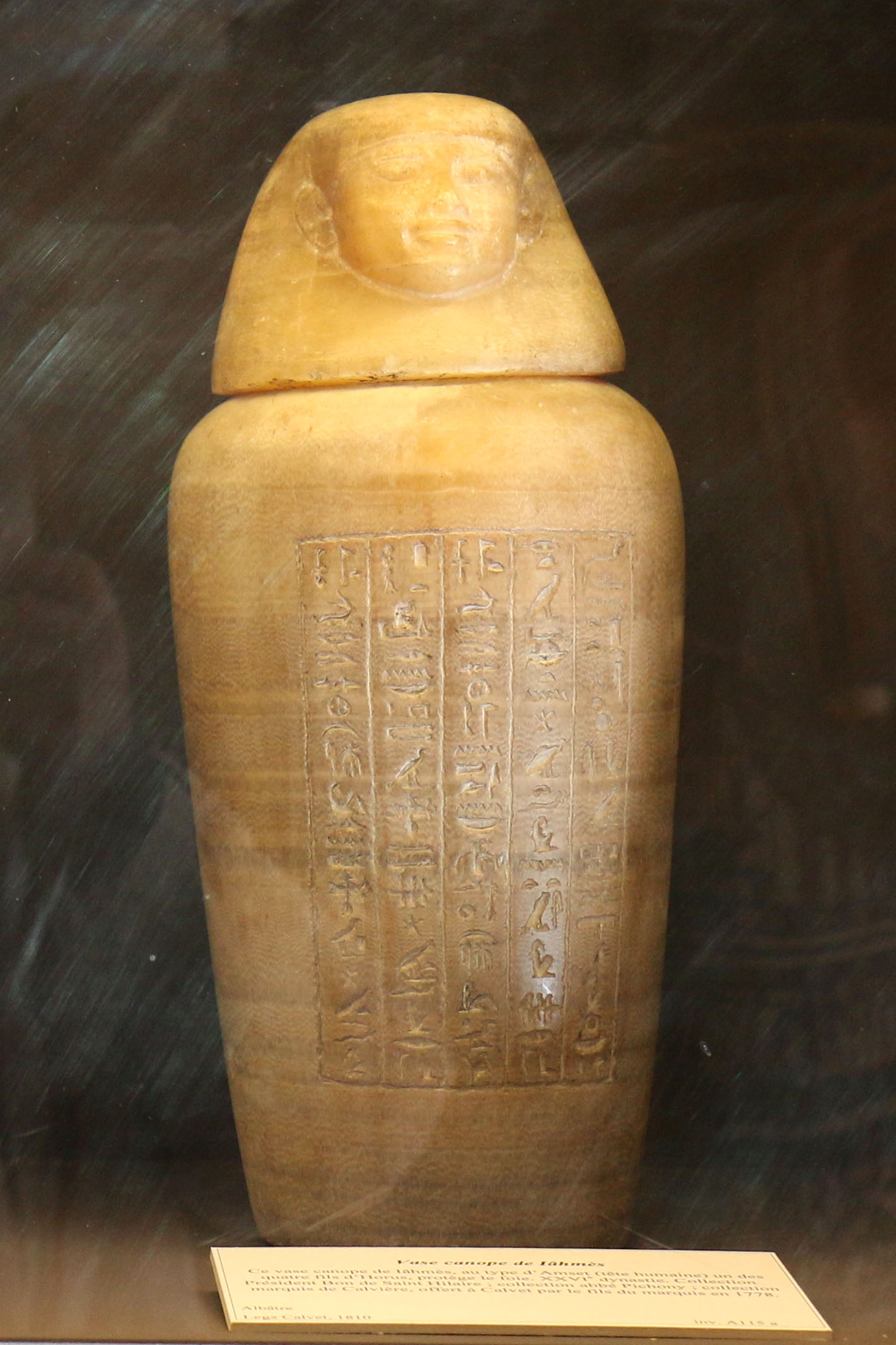
Canopic jar

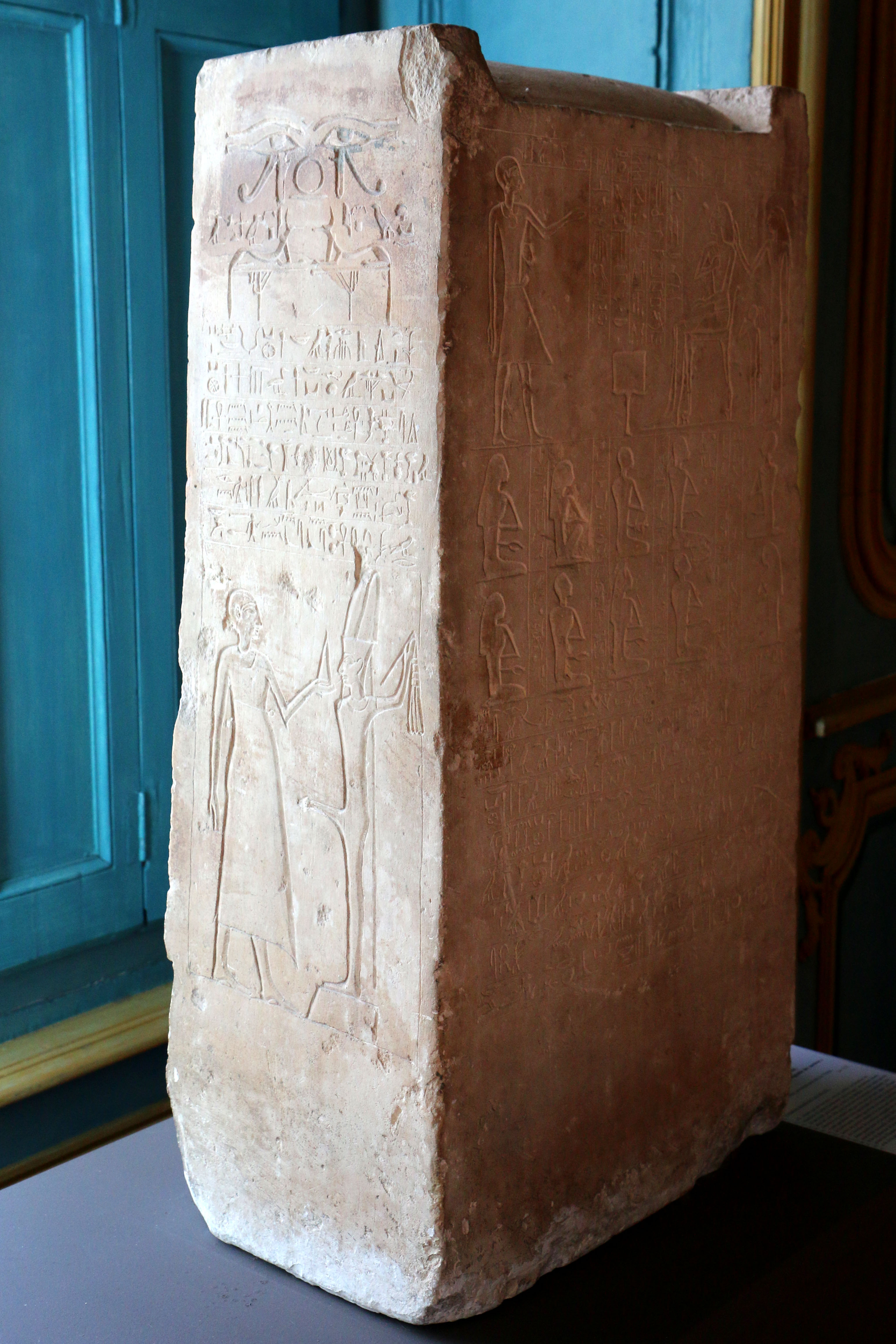
Ex-voto of YaÏ.

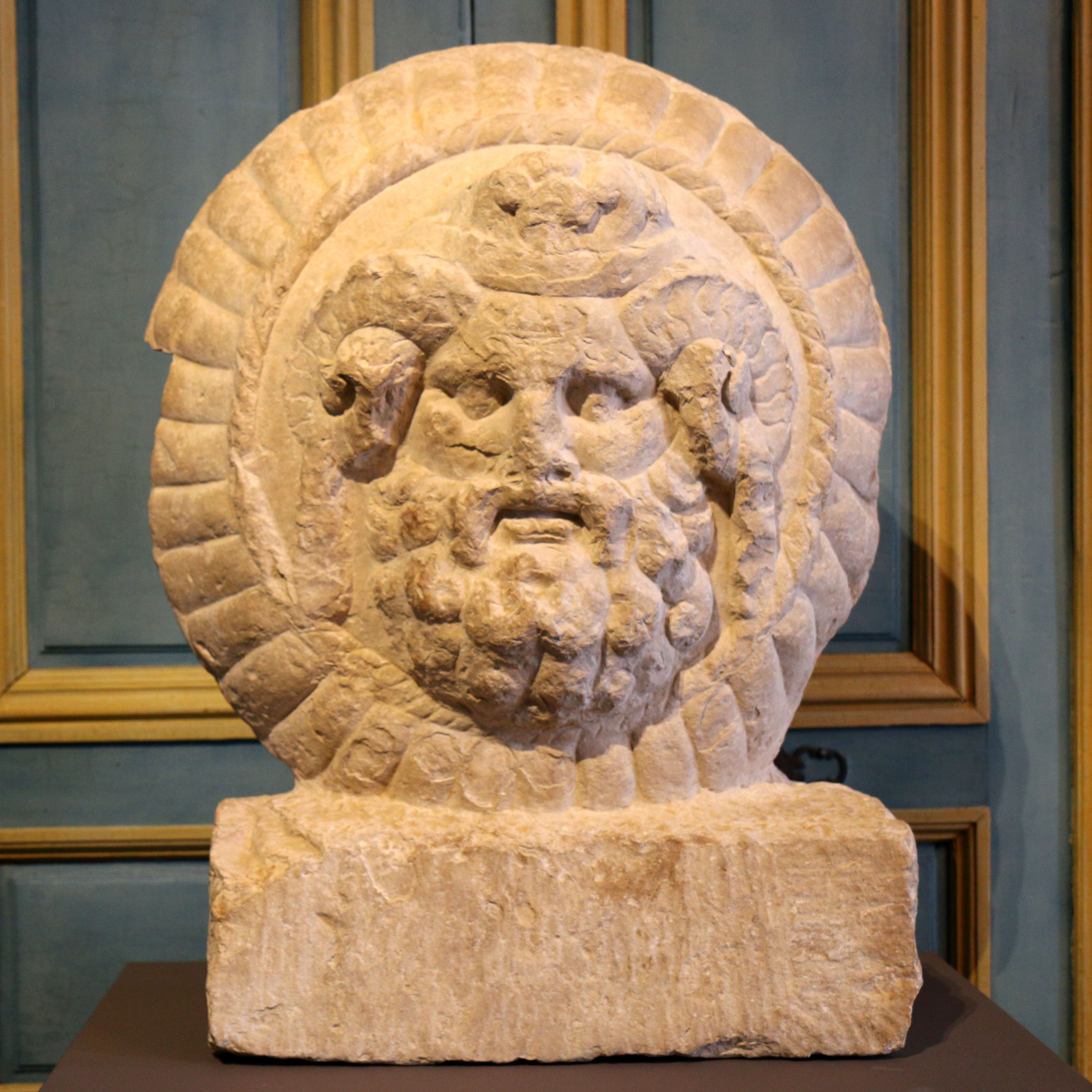
Medallion of eAmmon.

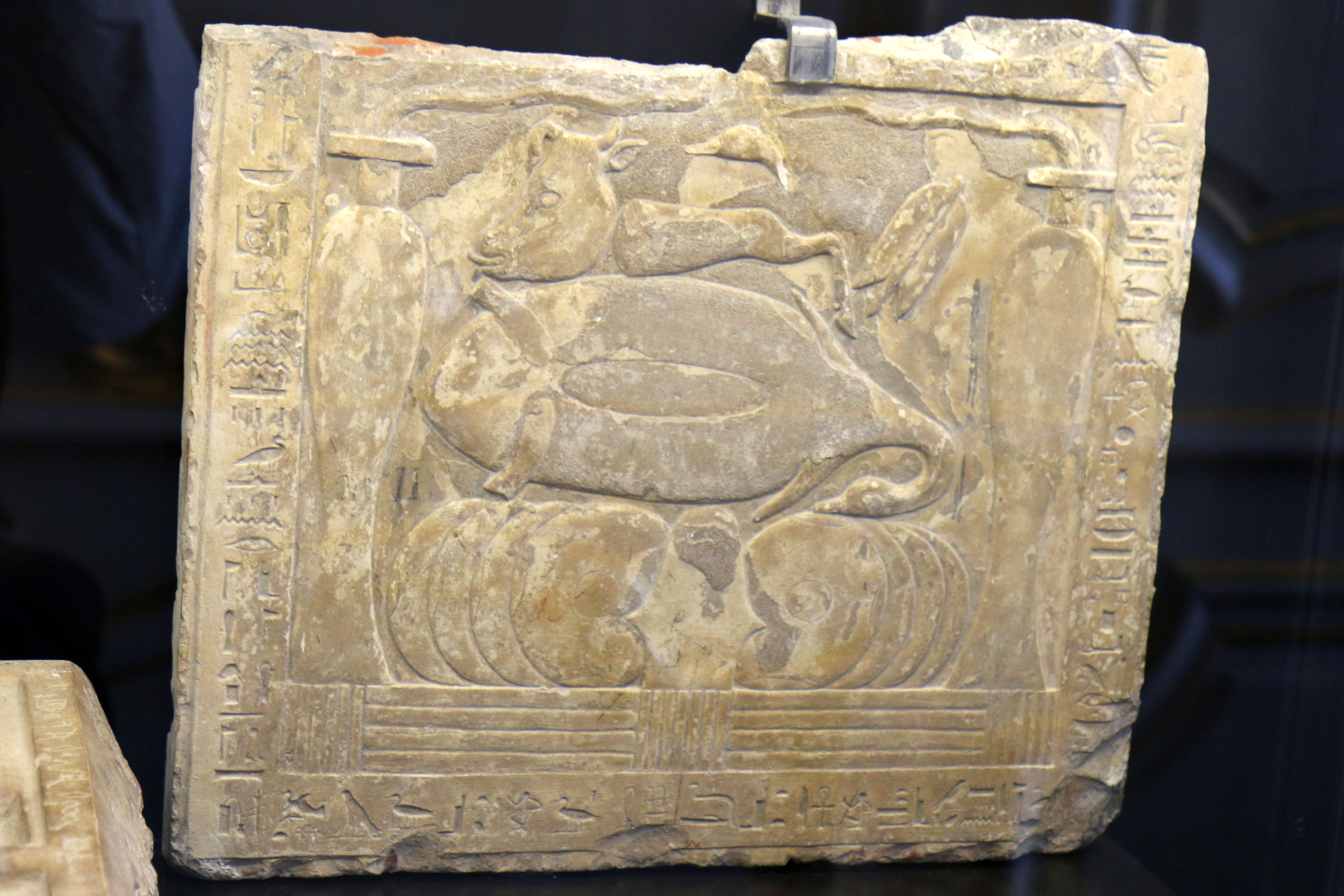
Offering table of Harsiési.

== Curators ==
- 1814–1823 : Pierre-Bertrand Dejean
- 1823–1838 : Joseph Guérin
- 1838–1840 : Marie-Charles-Jean-Louis-Casimir De Blégier
- 1841–1849 : Dominique-Victor-Hyacinthe Chaubaud
- 1849–1851 : Esprit Requien
- 1852–1890 : Augustin Deloye
- 1890–1906 : Léon-Honoré Labande
- 1906–1949 : Joseph Girard
- 1949–1984 : Georges De Loye
- 1984–1991 : Marie-Pierre Foissy-Aufrère
- 1992–1995 : Odile Cavalier (Lapidary Museum only)
- 1995–2004 : Pierre Provoyeur
- 2005–2015 : Sylvain Boyer

== Bibliography ==
- Alexis Mouzin, « La collection du maître ferronnier Noël Biret au Musée Calvet », in Mémoires de l'Académie de Vaucluse, 1919, p. 1-15 (online)
- Joseph Girard, « Les Villeneuve-Martignan et leur hôtel à Avignon », in Mémoires de l'Académie de Vaucluse, 1935, p. 103-138 (online)
- Sylvain Gagnière and Pierre de Brun, Les Lampes antiques du musée Calvet d'Avignon, preface by abbé Joseph Sautel, 1937.
- Sylvain Gagnière and Jacky Granier, Épées, poignards et couteaux en bronze du musée Calvet d'Avignon, Ogam : tradition celtique, 79, 1962, p. 13–24.
- Joseph Girard, « Histoire du musée Calvet », dans Provence historique, tome 4, fascicule 18, 1954, p. 6-130 (pdf online).
- Joseph Girard, Évocation du vieil Avignon, Paris, Les Éditions de Minuit, 1958 réédition 2007, p. 200-213 ISBN 270731353X.
- Pascale Picard (ed.), Mirabilis, Collections d'Avignon (cat. exp. 2018), Milan, Silvana Editoriale, Avignon, AvignonMusées, 2018, 190 p.
