= List of faculty and alumni of the Académie Julian =

Académie Julian
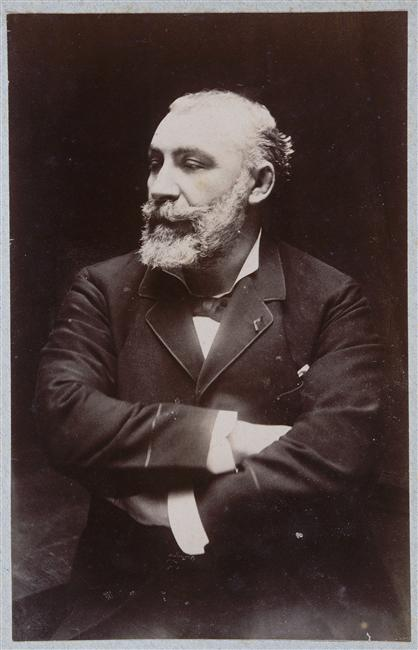
- Rodolphe Julian (1839–1907); Founder

This list includes notable professors and students of the Académie Julian, a private art school in Paris founded by Rodolphe Julian that was active from 1867 to 1968.

== Notable professors ==
Name	Dates	Image	References
Marcel Baschet	1862–1941		
Jean-Joseph Benjamin-Constant	1845–1902		
Jean Bouchaud	1891–1977		
William-Adolphe Bouguereau	1825–1905		
Gustave Boulanger	1824–1888		
Alfred-Henri Bramtot	1852–1894		
Jules Cavaillès	1901–1977		
Edgar Chahine	1874–1947		
Henri Chapu	1833–1891		
Gustave-Henri Colin	1828–1910		
André Del Debbio	1908–2010		
Adolphe Déchenaud	1868–1926		
Constant Detré	1891–1945		
Louis-Théodore Devilly	1818–1886		
Étienne Dinet	1861–1929		
Henri Lucien Doucet	1865–1895		
Gabriel Ferrier	1847–1914		
François Flameng	1856–1923		
Marcel Gimond	1846–1961		
William Laparra	1873–1920		
Jean-Paul Laurens	1838–1921		
Jean-Pierre Laurens	1875–1932		
Paul Albert Laurens	1870–1934		
Jules Joseph Lefebvre	1834–1912		
Roger Limouse	1884–1990		
Jules Eugene Pages	1867-1946		
Robert Poughéon	1886–1955		
Tony Robert-Fleury	1837–1911		
Henri Royer	1869–1938		
Émile Sabouraud	1900-1996		
François Schommer	1850–1935		
Édouard Toudouze	1848–1907		
Raoul Verlet	1857–1923		
Henri-Achille Zo	1873–1933		

== Notable students ==
Name	Dates	Nationality	Image	References
Louis Abel-Truchet	1857–1918	France		
Jules Adler	1865–1952	France		
George Henry Clements	1854–1935	United States		
Arthur Aesbacher	q923–2020	Switzerland		
Marella Agnelli	1927–2019	Italy		
George Charles Aid	1872–1938	United States		
Gustave Alaux	1887–1965	France		
Georgina de Albuquerque	1855–1962	Brazil		
Lucílio de Albuquerque	1877–1939	Brazil		
Abigail May Alcott Nieriker	1840–1879	United States		(Note: In 1879, May Alcott Nieriker, published her guide; Studying art abroad and how to do it cheaply, on p. 48 and 49, she describes the atelier on passage des Panoramas, as well as Rodolphe Julian whom she calls, "M. Jullien". School records indicate her attendance in 1870.)
Mirra Alfassa	1878–1973	France		
Eugène Alluaud	1866–1947	France		
Joseph Allworthy	1892–1991	United States		
Mathias Alten	1871–1938	United States		
Tarsila do Amaral	1886–1973	Brazil		
Ernest Amas	1869–1959	France		
Cuno Amiet	1868-1961	Switzerland		
Mary Ammirato-Collins	1908–	United States		
Rodolfo Amoedo	1857–1941	Brazil		
Albert André	1869–1954	France		
Ion Andreescu	1850–1882	Romania		
Boris Anrep	1883–1969	Russia		
Thomas Pollock Anshutz	1851–1912	United States		
Athanase Apartis	1899–1972	Greece		
Caroline Helena Armington	1875–1939	Canada		
Frank Armington	1876–1941	Canada		
Jean Arp (Hans Arp)	1886-1966	Germany; France		
Will Ashton	1881–1963	Australia		
Jane Atché	1872–1937	France		
Ioan Bărbulescu Aluta	1860–1944	Romania		
Léon Bakst	1866–1924	Russia; Belarus (Note: Most of Belarus was part of the Russian Empire before 1917 and part of the USSR from 1917 to 1991.)		
Edith Ella Baldwin	1848–1920	United States		
Ernst Barlach	1870-1938	Germany		
John Noble Barlow	1861–1917	United Kingdom; United States		
Wright Barker	1863–1941	United Kingdom		
William Barr	1867–1933	United Kingdom		
Raoul Barré	1874–1932	Canada		
William Barribal	1874–1952	United Kingdom		
Paul Basilius Barth	1881–1955	Switzerland		
Charles W. Bartlett	1860–1940	United Kingdom		
Jacques Barcat	1877–1955	France		
Marcel Baschet	1862–1941	France		
Marie Bashkirtseff	1858–1884	Russia; Ukraine (Note: Ukraine was part of the Russian Empire before 1917. Parts of Ukraine became part of the USSR in 1921 and the rest in 1931. Ukraine became independent in 1991.)		
Henry Bataille	1872–1922	France		
Paul Baudier	1881–1962	France		
Jean René Bazaine	1904–2001	France		
John William Beatty	1869–1941	Canada		
Henri Beau	1863–1949	Canada		
Amélie Beaury-Saurel	1848 - 1924	France		
Émile Beaussier	1874-1943	France		
Cecilia Beaux	1855-1942	United States		
Eugène Béjot	1867–1931	France		
Octave Bélanger	1886–1972	Canada		
Rebeca Matte Bello	1875–1929	Chile		
Shmuel Ben David	1884–1927	Bulgaria		
Enella Benedict	1858–1942	United States		
Frank Weston Benson	1862–1951	United States		
Thomas Hart Benton	1889–1975	United States		
Róbert Berény	1887–1953	Hungary		
Camille Berlin	1866–19?	France		
Marguerite Bermond	1911–1991	France		
Ricardo Acevedo Bernal	1867–1930	Colombia		
Émile Bernard	1868–1941	France		
Albert Bertalan	1899–1957	Hungary		
Robert Bevan	1865–1925	United Kingdom		
George Biddle	1885–1973	United States		
Ernest Biéler	1863–1948	Switzerland		
Anna Bilińska-Bohdanowicz	1857–1893	Poland		
Edmond Bille	1878–1959	Switzerland		
Henri Biva	1848–1929	France		
Ernest L. Blumenschein	1874–1960	United States		
Emilio Boggio	1857-1920	Venezuela		
Georges A. L. Boisselier	1876-1943	France		
Pierre Bonnard	1867-1947	France		
Gutzon Borglum	1867-1941	United States		
Étienne Bouchaud	1898-1989	France		
Jean Bouchaud	1891-1977	France		
Jean Boucher	1870-1939	France		
Joseph-Félix Bouchor	1853-1937	France		
Louise Bourgeois	1911-2010	France		
Camille Bourget	1866-1931	France		
André Boursier-Mougenot	1892-1971	France		
Louise Catherine Breslau	1856-1927	Switzerland		
Artus Van Briggle	1869-1904	United States		
Frederick Brown	1851–1941	United Kingdom		
Franklin Brownell	1857–1946	Canada		
Hiram Brülhart	1878-1949	Switzerland		
Clément Brun	1867-1920	France		
Frank Budgen	1882–1971	United Kingdom		
Étienne Buffet	1866-1948	France		
Francis Cadell	1883–1937	United Kingdom		
Hermenegildo Anglada Camarasa	1871-1959	Spain		
Francisco Antonio Cano	1865–1935	Colombia		
Joseph Carlier	1849–1927	France		
George Francis Carline	1855–1920	United Kingdom		
Mary Helen Carlisle	1869 - 1925	United Kingdom		
Florence Carlyle	1864–1923	Canada		
Cassandre	1901–1968	Ukraine		
Jean-Edouard de Castella	1881–1966	Switzerland		
Edmond Ceria	1884–1955	France		
Maurice Chabas	1862–1947	France		
Auguste Chabaud	1882–1955	France		
Oliver Newberry Chaffee	1881–1944	United States		
Edgar Chahine	1874–1947	France; Armenia (Note: Armenia was part of the Ottoman Empire before 1918.)		
Jefferson David Chalfant	1856-1931	United States		
Rene Paul Chambellan	1893-1955	United States		
Robert W. Chambers	1865-1933	United States		
Gabriel Charlopeau	1889-1967	France		
Roger Chastel	1897-1981	France		
Olivier Chéron	1854-1935	France		
Benjamen Chinn	1921-2009	United States		
Aurel Ciupe	1900-1985	Romania		
Alson S. Clark	1876-1949	United States		
George Clausen	1852–1944	United Kingdom		
Pierre Clayette	1930-2005	France		
John Willard Clawson	1858-1936	United States		
Pierre Clerk	1928–	Canada		
Griffith Baily Coale	1890-1950	United States		
Émile Compard	1900-1977	France		
Charles Conder	1868–1909	United Kingdom		
Colin Campbell Cooper	1856-1937	United States		
Charles Cottet	1863-1925	France		
William Cotton	1880-1958	United States		
E. Irving Couse	1866-1936	United States		
Jose de Creeft	1884-1982	United States		
Jean Crotti	1878-1958	France		
Maurice Cullen	1866–1934	Canada		
Charles Courtney Curran	1861-1942	United States		
Ralph Wormeley Curtis	1854-1922	United States		
Otho Cushing	1871-1942	United States		
Cyrus Dallin	1861-1944	United States		
Raoul Dastrac	1891-1969	France		
Lucien Daudet	1878-1946	France		
Hermine David	1886–1970	France		
Mariamna Davydoff	1871 - 1961	Ukraine		
Fabián de la Rosa	1869–1937	Philippines		
Walter Lofthouse Dean	1854-1912	United States		
Angèle Delasalle	1867-1941	France		
Jenny Eakin Delony	1866-1949	United States		
Charles Demuth	1883-1935	United States		
Maurice Denis	1870-1943	France		
André Derain	1880-1954	France		
Gleb W. Derujinsky	1888-1975	Russia		
Louis-Marie Désiré-Lucas	1869-1949	France		
Émilie Desjeux	1861-1957	France		
George Desvallières	1861–1950	France		
Charles Devillié	1850–1905	France		
Wynford Dewhurst	1864–1941	United Kingdom		
Thomas Dewing	1851-1938	United States		
André Dignimont	1891-1965	France		
Arthur Wesley Dow	1857-1922	United States		
William Henry Drake	1856-1926	United States		
Jean Dubuffet	1901-1985	France		
Marcel Duchamp	1887-1968	France		
Georges Dufrénoy	1870-1943	France		
Thomas Cantrell Dugdale	1880–1952	United Kingdom		
Rodolphe Duguay	1891–1973	Canada		
Edmund Dulac	1882-1953	France		
Frank DuMond	1865-1951	United States		
Anne Dunn	1929–	United Kingdom		
Juan de Echevarría	1875–1931	Spain		
József Egry	1883-1951	Hungary		
John Elliott	1858–1925	United Kingdom		
Frederick William Elwell	1870–1958	United Kingdom		
Lydia Field Emmet	1866-1952	United States		
Magnus Enckell	1870–1925	Finland		
Jacob Epstein	1880–1959	United Kingdom		
Fritz Erler	1868-1940	Germany		
Hans Erni	1909-2015	Switzerland		
Jesus Maria Espinosa	1908–1995	Colombia		
Louis Evrard	1905-1989	France		
Mary Fairchild MacMonnies Low	1858-1946	United States		
Abel Faivre	1867-1945	France		
Birgitta Moran Farmer	1881–1939	United States		
Herbert Cyrus Farnum	1866-1926	United States		
Yves Faucheur	1924-1985	France		
Serge Férat	1881-1958	Russia		
Frédéric Fiebig	1885-1953	Latvia		
Madeleine Fié-Fieux	1897-1995	France		
Lucien Fontanarosa	1912-1975	France		
Eric Forbes-Robertson	1865–1935	United Kingdom		
Emanuel Phillips Fox	1865–1915	Australia		
Julieta de França	1872–1951	Brazil		
Joseph-Charles Franchère	1866–1921	Canada		
Dominique Frassati	1896-1947	France		
Frederick Carl Frieseke	1874-1939	United States		
Clarence Gagnon	1881–1942	Canada		
Sears Gallagher	1869-1955	United States		
Akseli Gallen-Kallela	1865–1931	Finland		
Octave Gallian	1855-1918	France		
David Garfinkiel	1902-1970	Poland		
Leon Gaspard	1882-1964	Russia		
Khalil Gibran	1883–1931	Lebanon (Note: Lebanon was part of the Ottoman Empire before 1918.); United States		
Françoise Gilot	1921-	France		
Georges Gimel	1898-1962	France		
Henri Bernard Goetz	1909-1989	United States		
Eric Goldberg	1890–1969	Canada		
C. F. Goldie	1870–1947	New Zealand		
Caroline Gotch	1854–1945	United Kingdom		
Eileen Gray	1878–1976	Ireland (Note: The Republic of Ireland was part of the United Kingdom before the establishment of the Irish Free State in 1922.)		
Alexander Grinager	1865-1949	United States		
Anthony Gross	1905–1984	United Kingdom		
Henri Guinier	1867-1927	France		
Herbert James Gunn	1893–1964	United Kingdom		
Pekka Halonen	1865–1933	Finland		
Marcel Hamel	1933-2009	France		
Herbert Hampton	1862–1929	United Kingdom		
Pop Hart	1868-1933	United States		
Werner Hartmann	1903-1981	Switzerland		
Archibald Standish Hartrick	1864–1950	United Kingdom		
Edmund Arthur Harvey	1907–1994	United Kingdom; Australia		
Ida C. Haskell	1861-1932	United States		
Childe Hassam	1859-1935	United States		
Theodore Haupt	1902-1990	United States		
Louis Welden Hawkins	1849-1910	Germany		
Stanley William Hayter	1901–1988	United Kingdom		
Kattingeri Krishna Hebbar	1911-1996	India		
Louise De Hem	1866–1922	Belgium		
Robert Henri	1865-1929	United States		
Paul Henry	1877–1958	Ireland		
Édouard Henry-Baudot	1871-1953	France		
René Georges Hermann-Paul	1864-1940	France		
Albert Herter	1871-1950	United States		
Halfdan Hertzberg	1857–1890	Norway		
Ludwig von Hofmann	1861-1945	Germany		
Hattie Hutchcraft Hill	1847-1921	United States		
D. Howard Hitchcock	1861-1943	United States		
Jack Hooper	1928-2014	United States		
Charles Hopkinson	1869-1962	United States		
Lucretia Van Horn	1882-1970	United States		
Cecil de Blaquiere Howard	1888–1956	United States		
Henry Salem Hubbell	1870–1949	United States		
Léonie Humbert-Vignot	1878-1960	France		
Will Hutchins	1878–1949	United States		
Henri-Gabriel Ibels	1867-1936	France		
Petre Iorgulescu-Yor	1890-1939	Romania		
Richard Jack	1866–1952	United Kingdom		
Alexander Young Jackson	1882–1974	Canada		
Elvire Jan	1904–1996	Bulgaria; France		
René Jaudon	1889-1966	France		
Gustave Louis Jaulmes	1873-1959	France		
Richard Jeranian	1921–2019	France; Armenia		
Frances Benjamin Johnston	1864-1952	United States		
Alfred Garth Jones	1872–1955	United Kingdom		
Loïs Mailou Jones	1905–1998	United States		
Károly Józsa	1872-1929	Hungary		
Amédée Joullin	1862-1917	United States		
Émile Jourdan	1860-1931	France		
Joseph Constantin Kaiser	1886-1955	Switzerland		
Antoni Kamieński	1860-1933	Poland		
Takeshiro Kanokogi	1874–1941	Japan		
Stanisława de Karłowska	1876-1952	Poland		
Barry Kay	1932–1985	Australia		
Augustus Kenderdine	1870–1947	Canada		
William Kennedy	1859–1918	United Kingdom		
Charles H. M. Kerr	1858–1907	United Kingdom		
Fernand Khnopff	1858–1921	Belgium		
Valentin Kielland	1866–1944	Norway		
Alonzo Myron Kimball	1874–1923	United States		
Mati Klarwein	1932-2002	Germany		
Georges-André Klein	1901-1992	France		
Anna Klumpke	1856-1942	United States		
Torleif S. Knaphus	1881–1965	Norway; United States		
Louis Aston Knight	1873-1948	United States		
Georg Kolbe	1877-1947	Germany		
Käthe Kollwitz	1867-1945	Germany		
Ludwik Konarzewski	1885-1954	Poland		
Albert Henry Krehbiel	1873-1945	United States		
Ludvík Kuba	1863-1956	Czechoslovakia (Note: Czechoslovakia was part of Austria-Hungary before 1918.)	Ludvík Kuba in the 1890's (around 30 yrs of age)	Ludvík Kuba
František Kupka	1871–1957	Czechoslovakia		
Chas Laborde	1886–1941	Argentina		
Jean Émile Laboureur	1877-1943	France		
Shanu Lahiri	1928-2013	India		
François-Xavier Lalanne	1927-2008	France		
Eugene Lanceray	1875-1946	Russia		
John St Helier Lander	1868–1944	Jersey		
Paul Landowski	1875-1961	France		,
Olaf Lange	1875–1965	Norway		
Pierre Langlade	1907-1972	France		
Maurice Lapaire	1905-1997	Switzerland		
Jean Laronze	1852-1937	France		
Jacques Henri Lartigue	1894-1986	France		
Philip Alexius de Laszlo	1869-1937	Hungary		
John Lavery	1856–1941	Ireland		
Mary Lawrence	1868-1945	United States		
Ernest Lawson	1873–1939	Canada		
Georges Lebacq	1876–1950	Belgium		
Fernand Léger	1881-1955	France		
Albert Lemaître	1886–1975	Belgium		
Lucy L'Engle	1889-1978	United States		
Sabine Lepsius	1864-1942	Germany		
Gisèle Lestrange	1927-1991	France		
John Levee	1924-2017	United States		
Frank Xavier Leyendecker	1876-1924	United States		
Joseph Christian Leyendecker	1874-1951	United States		
Flora Lion	1878–1958	United Kingdom		
Mortimer Lichtenauer	1876–1966	United States		
Jacques Lipchitz	1891–1973	Lithuania (Note: Lithuania was part of the Polish–Lithuanian Commonwealth before 1918 and of the USSR from 1922 to 1990.); France; United States		
Eugène Loup	1867–1948	France		
Ștefan Luchian	1868-1916	Romania		
Amélie Helga Lundahl	1850–1914	Finland		
John Goodwin Lyman	1886–1967	Canada		
Stanton Macdonald-Wright	1890-1973	United States		
William Brown Macdougall	1868–1936	United Kingdom		
Jacques Majorelle	1886-1962	France		
Lucien de Maleville	1881-1964	France		
Jeanne Mammen	1890-1976	Germany		
Vincent Manago	1880–1936	Italy		
Vahram Manavyan	1880-1952	Turkey		
Alexander Mann	1853–1908	United Kingdom		
Harrington Mann	1864–1937	United Kingdom		
Ödön Márffy	1878-1959	Hungary		
Lajos Márk	1867-1942	Hungary		
Constance Markievicz	1868–1927	Ireland		
Martine Martine	1932-	France		
Antoine Martinez	1913-1970	France		
Johannes Martini	1866-1935	Germany		
Arthur Frank Mathews	1860-1945	United States		
Henri Matisse	1869–1954	France		
Charles Maurin	1856-1914	France		
Robert Bledsoe Mayfield	1869-1934	United States		
Jozef Mehoffer	1869-1946	Poland		
Ludwig Meidner	1884-1966	Germany		
Gari Melchers	1860-1932	United States		
Willard Leroy Metcalf	1858-1925	United States		
Suzanne Meunier	1888-1979	France		
Émile-René Ménard	1862–1930	France		
Arturo Michelena	1863-1898	Venezuela		
Arthur Midy	1877-1944	France		
Richard Miller	1875-1943	United States		
Guy de Montlaur	1918-1977	France		
George Moore	1852–1933	Ireland		
Henry Moret	1856-1913	France		
Blanche Moria	1859-1926	France		
Henri Morisset	1870-1956	France		
Harry Morley	1881–1943	United Kingdom		
James Wilson Morrice	1865–1924	Canada		
Alphonse Mucha	1860–1939	Czechoslovakia		
Albert Henry Munsell	1858-1918	United States		
Oscar Rodríguez Naranjo	1907–2006	Colombia		
Pascual Navarro	1923-1986	Venezuela		
Jean Negulesco	1900–1994	Romania		
Ismael Nery	1900–1934	Brazil		
Abraham Neumann	1873–1942	Poland		
Lorenzo de Nevers	1877–1967	Canada		
C. R. W. Nevinson	1889–1946	United Kingdom		
Kay Nielsen	1886–1957	Denmark		
Roger Nivelt	1899-1962	France		
Emil Nolde	1867-1956	Germany		
Bror Julius Olsson Nordfeldt	1878-1955	Sweden		
Ernest Normand	1859–1923	United Kingdom		
Jenny Nyström	1854-1946	Sweden		
Hermann Obrist	1862-1927	Switzerland		
Jacques Ochs	1883–1971	Belgium		
Eugène Ogé	1861-1936	France		
Alfred Henry O'Keeffe	1858–1941	New Zealand		
Fernand Allard l'Olivier	1883–1933	Belgium		
Aina Onabolu	1882–1963	Nigeria		
Omar Onsi	1901–1969	Lebanon		
Blanche Adele Ostertag	1872–1915	United States		
Aniela Pająkówna	1864–1912	Poland		
Sara Page	1855–1943	United Kingdom		
Pang Xunqin	1906–1985	China		
Betty Waldo Parish	1910–1986	United States		
Abel Pann	1883–1963	Latvia; Israel		
Irene E. Parmelee	1847-1934	United States		
William McGregor Paxton	1869-1941	United States	x100px|center]	
Margaret Bucknell Pecorini	1879-1963	United States		
Mildred Peel	1856–1920	Canada		
Waldo Peirce	1884-1970	United States		
Sophie Pemberton	1869–1959	Canada		
Lilla Cabot Perry	1848-1933	United States		
Jean Peské	1870-1949	Ukraine		
Gheorghe Petrașcu	1872-1949	Romania		
Bert Geer Phillips	1868-1956	United States		
Max Pietschmann	1865–1952	Germany		
Robert W. Pilot	1898–1967	Canada		
Narcisse Poirier	1883–1984	Canada		
Edward Clark Potter	1857-1923	United States		
Gaston Pottier	1885-1980	France		
Jane Poupelet	1874-1932	France		
Harold Septimus Power	1877–1951	Australia		
Edith Mitchill Prellwitz	1864-1944	United States		
Henry Prellwitz	1865-1940	United States		
Maurice Prendergast	1858-1924	United States		
Norman Mills Price	1877-1951	United States		
Sarah Purser	1848–1943	Ireland		
Hovsep Pushman	1877-1966	United States		
Leo Putz	1869-1940	Germany		
Jean Puy	1876-1960	France		
Mélanie Quentin	1946-	France		
Henrietta Rae	1859–1928	United Kingdom		
Pierre Rambaud	1852-1893	France		
Paul Ranson	1864-1909	France		
Joseph Raphael	1869-1950	United States		
Wilhelm Rasmussen	1879–1965	Norway		
John Willard Raught	1857-1931	United States		
Robert Rauschenberg	1925-2008	United States		
Frank Reaugh	1860-1945	United States		
Hilla von Rebay	1890-1967	Germany		
John Recknagel	1870-1940	United States		
Edward Willis Redfield	1869-1965	United States		
Granville Redmond	1871-1935	United States		
Robert Lewis Reid	1862-1929	United States		
Camil Ressu	1880-1962	Romania		
Frances Richards	1852–1934	Canada		
Diego Rivera	1886–1957	Mexico		
Adolf Robbi	1868-1920	Switzerland		
Andrea Robbi	1864-1945	Switzerland		
Elizabeth Wentworth Roberts	1871-1927	United States		
Frederick Cayley Robinson	1862–1927	United Kingdom		
Georges Rochegrosse	1859-1938	France		
Georgios Roilos	1867–1928	Greece		
Cristóbal Rojas	1857-1890	Venezuela		
Guy Rose	1867-1925	United States		
William Rothenstein	1872–1945	United Kingdom		
Ker-Xavier Roussel	1867-1944	France		
Pierre Roy	1880-1950	France		
Alexander Rummler	1867-1959	United States		
Thomas Ryan	1864-1927	New Zealand		
Chauncey Foster Ryder	1868-1949	United States		
Ahmed Sabri	1889–1955	Egypt		
Alexander Sachal	1924-2020	Russia		
Ernest de Saisset	1864-1899	United States		
Eugénie Salanson	1836-1912	France		
Tito Salas	1887-1974	Venezuela		
John Singer Sargent	1856-1925	United States		
Rudolf Scharpf	1919-2014	Germany		
Ludwig Scheuermann	1859-1911	Germany		
Annie Shepley Omori	1856–1943	United States		
Hans Schuler	1874-1951	United States		
René Schützenberger	1860-1916	France		
Guillaume Seignac	1870-1924	France		
Paul Sérusier	1864-1927	France		
Ernest Thompson Seton	1860-1946	United States		
William Somerville Shanks	1864-1951	United Kingdom		
Joseph Henry Sharp	1859-1953	United States		
Aleksandr Shevchenko	1883-1948	Ukraine; Russia		
Paul Sibra	1889-1951	France		
Amanda Sidwall	1844-1892	Sweden		
William Posey Silva	1859-1948	United States		
Edward Simmons	1852-1931	United States		
Lucien Simon	1861-1945	France		
Simpson Charles Walter	1855–1971	United Kingdom		
Max Slevogt	1868-1932	Germany		
Władysław Ślewiński	1856-1918	Poland		
Henri-Alexandre Sollier	1896-1966	France		
Yngvar Sonnichsen	1873–1938	Norway; United States		
María Obligado de Soto y Calvo	1857–1938	Argentina		
Aurélia de Souza	1866-1922	Portugal		
Sofia Martins de Sousa	1870-1960	Portugal		
Arthur Watson Sparks	1871-1919	United States		
Zofia Stankiewicz	1862-1955	Poland		
Edward Steichen	1879-1973	United States		
Carole Steyn	1938-	United Kingdom		
John Storrs	1885-1956	United States		
Gabriel Sue	1867-1958	France		
August Suter	1887-1965	Switzerland		
Marc-Aurèle de Foy Suzor-Coté	1869–1937	Canada		
Arthur Szyk	1894-1951	Poland		
Allen Butler Talcott	1867-1908	United States		
Henry Ossawa Tanner	1859-1937	United States		
Edmund C. Tarbell	1862-1938	United States		
Maurice Tastemain	1878-1944	France		
Francis Tattegrain	1852-1915	France		
Madge Tennent	1889–1972	United States		
Louis-Édouard Toulet	1892-1967	France		
Channel Pickering Townsley	1867–1921	United States		
Ernő Tibor	1885–1945	Hungary		
Edward Townsend Howes	1877–1964	United States		
William B. T. Trego	1858-1909	United States		
Antony Troncet	1879-1939	France		
Tseng Kwong Chi	1950-1990	United States		
John Henry Twachtman	1853-1902	United States		
Hans Unger	1872-1936	Germany		
Gunnar Utsond	1864–1950	Norway		
Félix Vallotton	1865-1925	Switzerland		
Louis Valtat	1869-1952	France		
Aagot Vangen	1875–1905	Norway		
Sam Vanni	1908–1992	Finland		
Henry Varnum	1887-1970	United States		
János Vaszary	1867-1939	Hungary		
Nicolina Vaz de Assis	1874–1941	Brazil		
Jean Vercoutter	1911-2000	France		
Eugène Viala	1859-1913	France		
Bernard Villemot	1911-1989	France		
Jacques Villon	1875-1963	France		
Eliseu Visconti	1866–1944	Brazil		
Martha Visser't Hooft	1906-1994	United States		
André-Léon Vivrel	1886-1976	France		
Clark Voorhees	1871-1933	United States		
Édouard Vuillard	1868-1940	France		
Herbert Ward	1863–1919	United Kingdom		
William T. Warrener	1861–1934	United Kingdom		
Max Weber	1881-1961	Russia		
Robert Wehrlin	1903-1964	Switzerland		
Susan Weil	1930-	United States		
Pedro Weingärtner	1853–1929	Brazil		
Frederic Whiting	1874–1962	United Kingdom		
David Ossipovitch Widhopff	1867-1933	Ukraine		
Carl Wilhelmson	1866-1928	Sweden		
Terrick Williams	1860–1936	United Kingdom		
Shirley Williamson	1875–1944	United States		
Walter Withers	1854–1914	Australia		
Beatrice Wood	1893-1998	United States		
Grant Wood	1891-1942	United States		
Martha Dewing Woodward	1856-1950	United States		
Xu Beihong	1895–1953	China		
Sōtarō Yasui	1888–1955	Japan		
Yvonne Ziegler	1902–1988	France		
Jenny Zillhardt	1857-1939	France		
Madeleine Zillhardt	1863-1950	France		
