= Adolf Robbi =

Swiss painter (1868–1920)

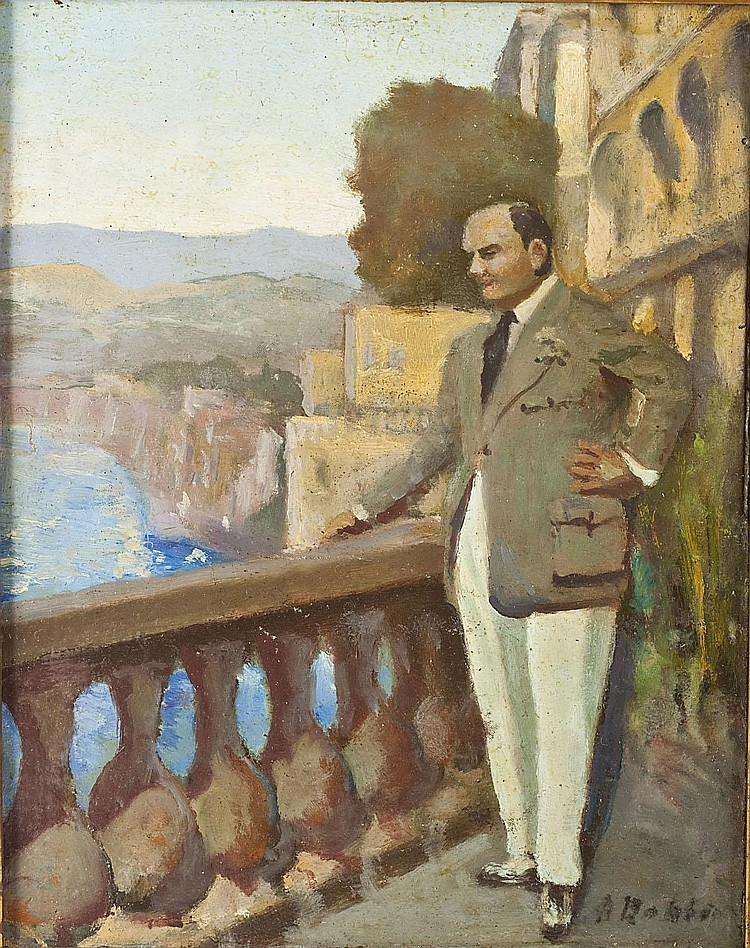
Caruso in Sorrento

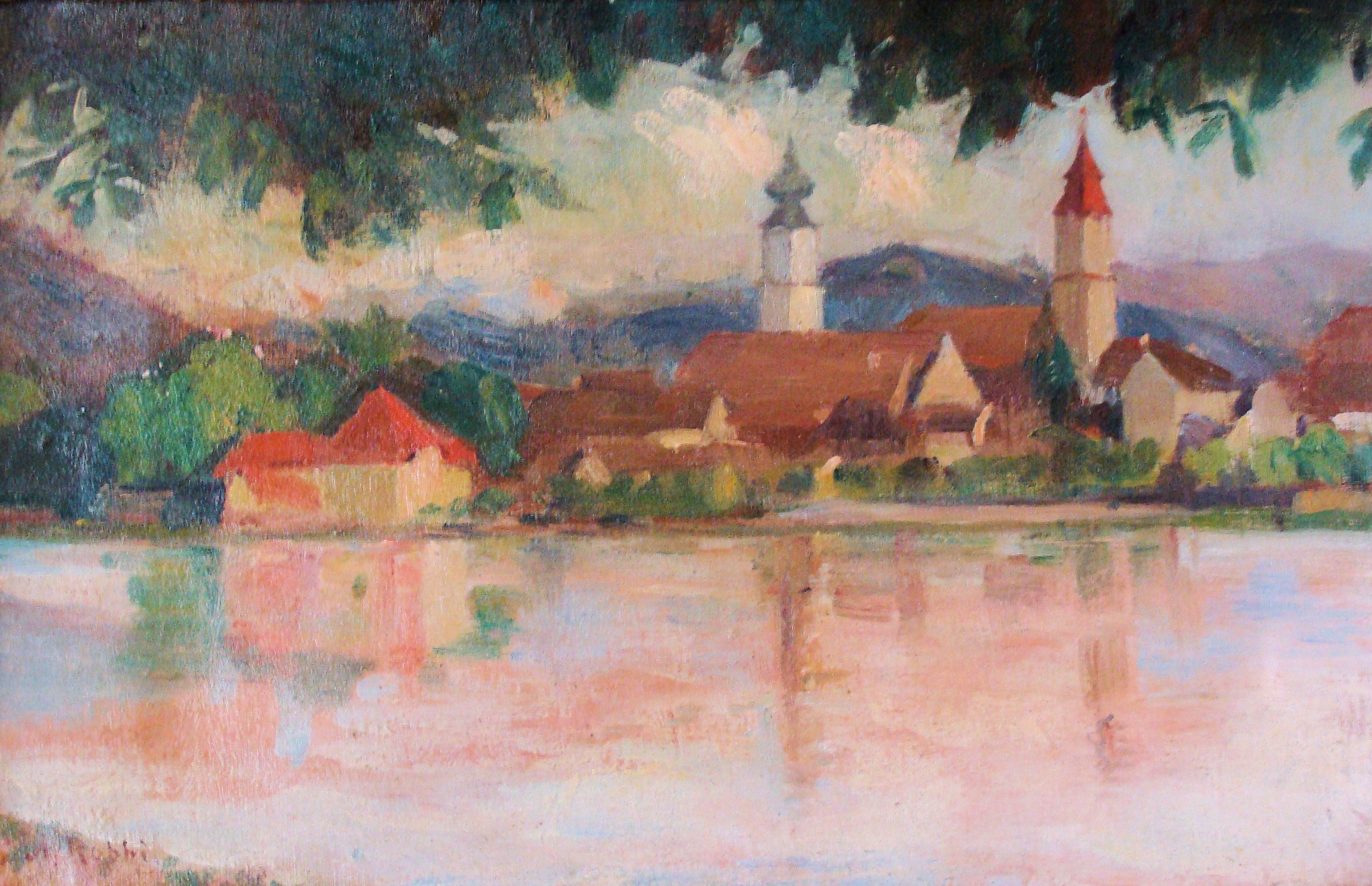
View of Lake Constance at Lindau

Adolf Robbi (26 February 1868, Ilanz - 31 December 1920, Munich) was a Swiss Impressionist painter.

== Biography ==
He lost his father when he was only seven. Having showed an early talent for art, his mother encouraged him and, at the age of fifteen, he went to Munich to study. Beginning at the Kunstgewerbeschule, he later attended the Academy of Fine Arts, where he studied with Karl Raupp and Johann Leonhard Raab.

After leaving there, he completed his studies at the Académie Julian, where his cousin, Andrea Robbi, would later be a student. In 1887, he decided to stay in Paris and moved into the Latin Quarter. The following year, he joined Les Nabis, a group of young artists who admired the works of Gauguin and Cézanne. Once he had settled on Impressionism as his favored style, he moved to the artists' colony at Pont-Aven, in Brittany, where he stayed at the Hôtel des Voyageurs and sometimes paid his bill with his paintings.

In 1891, he had his first significant exhibit at the Salon. From 1893 to 1895, he lived in Rome, then exhibited in Geneva. This was followed by stays in Mannheim, Florence and Lindau. In 1904, he exhibited in Düsseldorf.

At the age of forty, he returned to Munich. Shortly after, he was afflicted with a progressive paralysis. His creativity withered and he became alcoholic. Later, he was confined for a time at the State Mental Hospital in Haar. After his mother died in 1918, he was left without family or friends and died alone in 1920.

Some of his works may be seen at the museums in Chur and Lindau.

== Sources ==
- Annetta Caratsch, Adolf Robbi, éditions Chalender Ladin, 2009
- "Adolf Robbi". SIKART Lexicon on art in Switzerland.
