= Midy =

Midy is a name.

== List of people with the surname ==
- Arthur Midy (1877–1944), French painter
- Paul Midy (born 1982), French politician

== List of people with the given name ==
- Midy Cua, Filipino politician

== See also ==
- Midy's theorem
- Irisbus Midys
