= Jack Hooper =

Jack Hooper may refer to:

- Jack Hooper (intelligence officer)
- Jack Hooper (artist)
- Jack Hooper (rugby union)
