= Recknagel =

Recknagel is a surname. Notable people with the surname include:

- Erich Recknagel (1904–1973), German ski jumper
- Helmut Recknagel (born 1937), German former ski jumper
- Hermann Recknagel (1892–1945), German general during World War II
- Alice Recknagel Ireys (1911–2000), American landscape architect
- John Recknagel (1870-1940), American painter, residing in France
