= Sènami Donoumassou =

Beninese visual artist

Sènami DONOUMASSOU
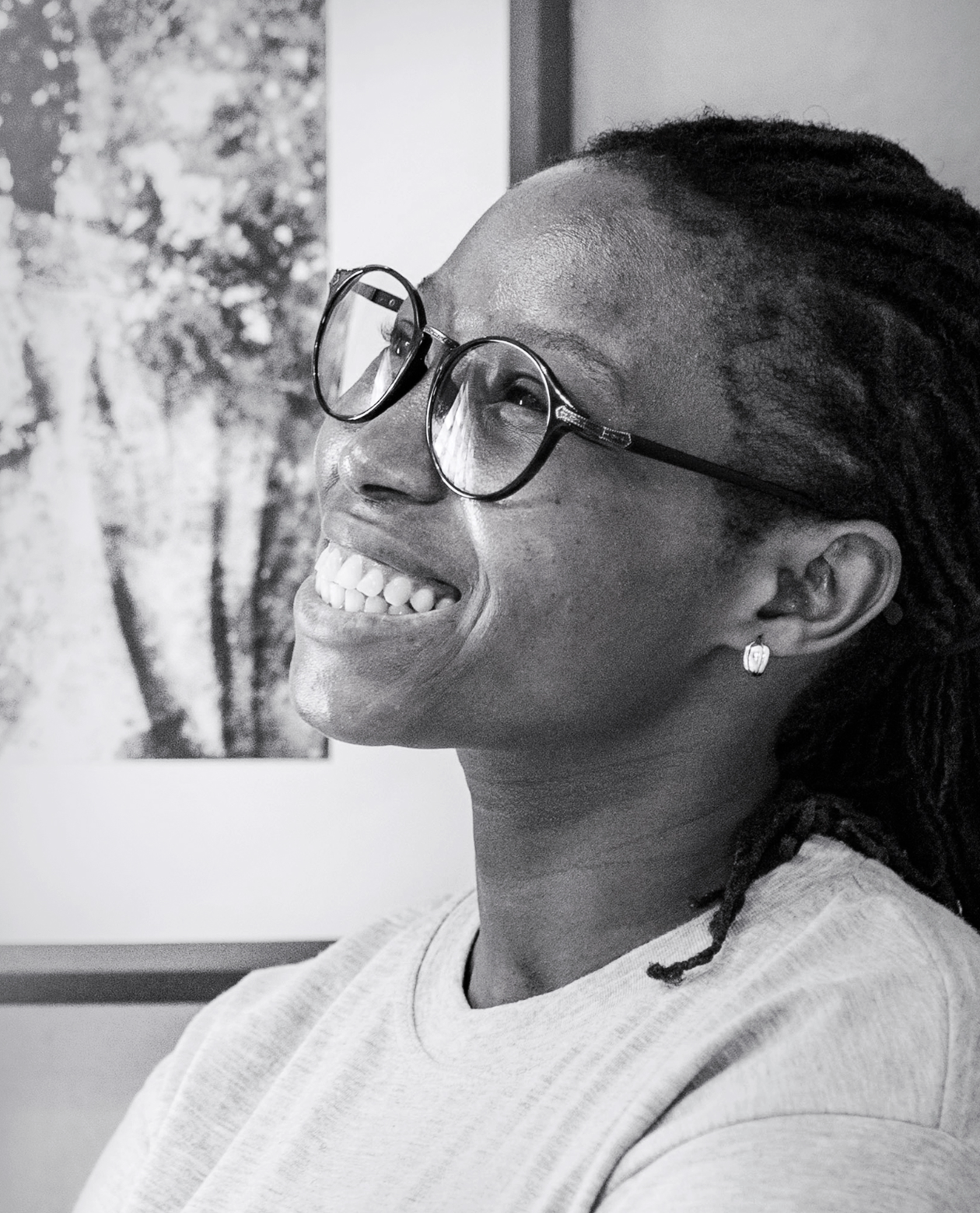
- Born: 1991 (age 34–35); Porto-Novo
- Education: Bachelor's degree in General and Territorial Administration
- Website: https://senamidonoumassou.com/

Sènami Donoumassou, born in 1991 in Porto-Novo, is a Beninese visual artist

== Biography ==
After obtaining a Bachelor's degree in General and Territorial Administration from ENAM (National School of Administration and Magistracy of Benin) in 2005, Sènami Donoumassou focuses on his artistic practice.

== Artistic approach ==
A visual artist, she explores notions of identity, heritage, and history, and experiments, through her creations, oscillating between photograms, multifaceted installations, and drawings, with the scope of the technical and poetic potentialities of light. The photogram, her preferred medium, is a space of perpetual exploration for the artist. She constantly interrogates it, testing its metaphorical, plastic, and aesthetic singularities.

== Exhibitions ==
Sènami Donoumassou presents his work in exhibitions in Benin as well as internationally, in various contexts, both individual and collective.

== Solo exhibitions ==
- 2024 : Tàn xó [Mémoire en prose], Fondation H, Paris.
- 2022 : Xogbè, Le Centre, Abomey-Calavi.
- 2019 : Chimie des traces, Institut Français, Cotonou.

== Awards ==
In 2022, she won the first edition of the James Barnor Prize. In 2024, she received a special mention from the Photography Prize of the musée du quai Branly – Jacques Chirac.
