= Outline of the visual arts =

Art forms that create works that are primarily visual in nature

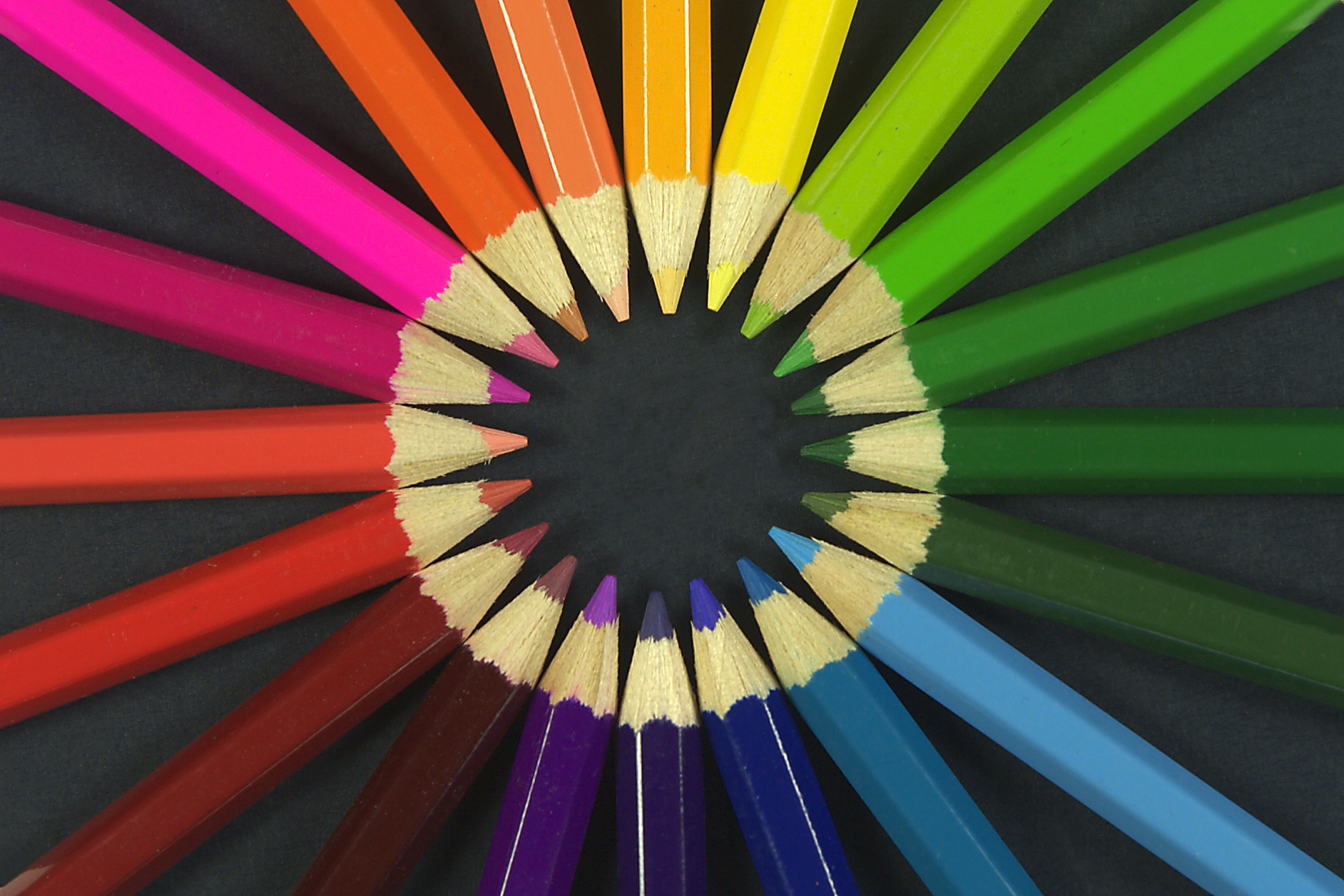
Colour is an important aspect of many of the visual arts.

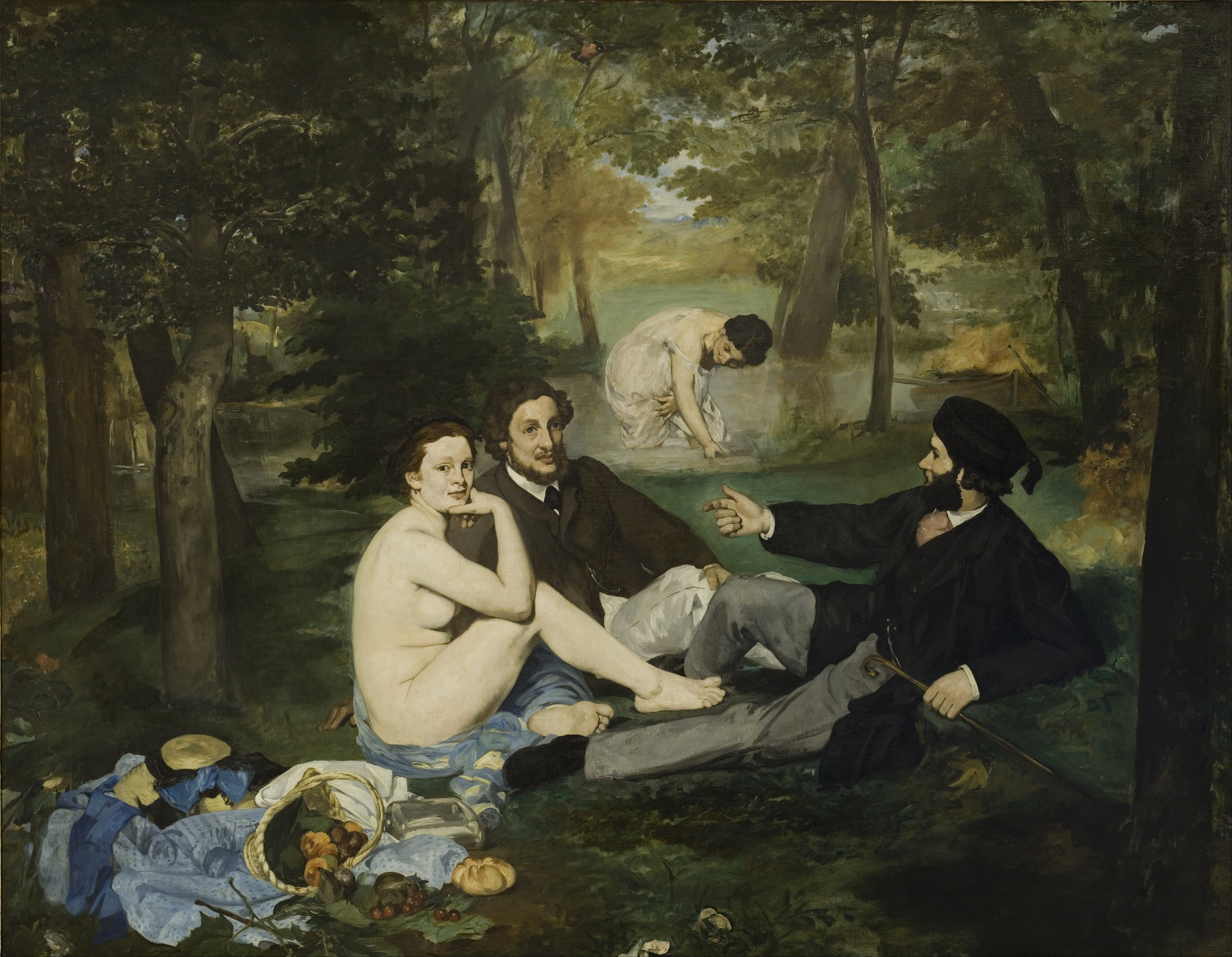
Le déjeuner sur l'herbe by Édouard Manet (1863)

Woman drawing in the Musée de Cluny (2015)

The following outline is provided as an overview of and topical guide to the visual arts:

The visual arts are art forms such as painting, drawing, printmaking, sculpture, ceramics, photography, video, image, filmmaking, design, crafts, and architecture. Many artistic disciplines such as performing arts, conceptual art, and textile arts also involve aspects of the visual arts, as well as arts of other types. Within the visual arts, the applied arts—such as industrial design, graphic design, fashion design, interior design, and decorative art—are also included.

== Types of visual art ==
- Architecture, process and product of planning, designing and construction. Architectural works, in the material form of buildings, are often perceived as cultural and political symbols and as works of art.
- Arts and crafts
- Asemic writing
- Animation
- Cartoon
- Ceramic art
- Collage
- Comics
- Conceptual art
- Decollage
- Decorative art
- Design, as a verb, it refers to the process of originating and developing a plan for a new object (machine, building, product, etc.). As a noun, it is used both for the final plan or proposal (a drawing, model, or other description), or the result of implementing that plan or proposal (the object produced).
  - Fashion design
  - Garden design
  - Graphic design
  - Motion graphic design
  - Web design, creation and maintenance of websites
- Digital art
  - Computer art
  - Internet art
- Drawing
- Embroidery
- Film
- Found object
- Glass art
- Graffiti
- Illustration
  - Concept art
- Installation art
- Lacquerware
- Land art
- Mail art
- Mixed media
- Narrative Art
- Textile arts
  - Dyeing
- Painting
- Paper art
  - Calligraphy
  - Origami
- Photography
- Printmaking
  - Etching
  - Lithography
  - Screen-printing
- Rock balancing
- Sculpture
- Street art
- Tattoos
- Television
- Typography
- Video art
- Visual poetry

== History of the visual arts ==
- History of animation
- Arts and Crafts movement
- History of ceramic art
- History of comics
- History of conceptual art
- History of drawing
- History of fashion design
- History of film
- History of graffiti
- History of illustration
- History of installation art
- History of mixed media
- History of painting
- History of photography
- History of printmaking
  - History of etching
  - History of lithography
  - History of screen-printing
- History of sculpture
- History of video art

== Elements of art ==
Elements of art – shape, form, value, line, color, space and texture

- Shape – area defined by edges
- Form – perceived volume or dimensionality
- Value – use of lightness (tint, or white) and darkness (shade, or black) in a piece of art
- Line – straight or curved marks that span a distance between two points. For example, see line art.
- Color – produced when light, striking an object, is reflected back to the eye.
  - Properties of color
    - Hue – red, yellow, blue, green, etc.
    - Intensity
    - Value (brightness)
- Space – area that an artist provides for a particular purpose. Space includes the background, foreground and middle ground, and refers to the distances or area(s) around, between, and within things.
- Texture – the way a three-dimensional work actually feels when touched, or the visual "feel" of a two-dimensional work

== General visual art concepts ==
Principles of art

- Animation
- Art collector
- Art gallery
- Art movement
- Cartoon
- Collage
- Composition
- Contemporary art
- Copyright
- Decorative art
- Derivative work
- Design
- Found object
- Giclée
- Graphic design
- Illustration
- Mixed media
- ModulArt
- Paint
- Paint brush
- Portraiture
- Printing press
- Old master print
- Sketchbook

== Visual artists ==
- List of animators
- List of fashion designers
- List of film and television directors
- List of painters
- List of photographers
- List of sculptors
- List of Stone Age art
- List of studio potters
- List of people associated with the Académie Julian
- Outline of performing arts

== See also ==
- Art
- List of art media
- Timeline of art
- The arts
- Visual Arts in Hong Kong
