= Jean Carzou =

French painter

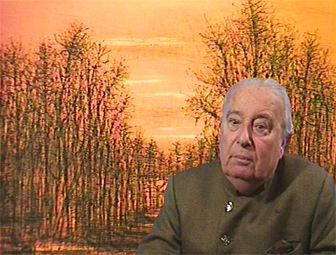
- Born: 1 January 1907; Aleppo, Aleppo Vilayet, Ottoman Empire
- Died: 12 August 2000 (aged 93); Marsac-sur-l'Isle, Dordogne, France

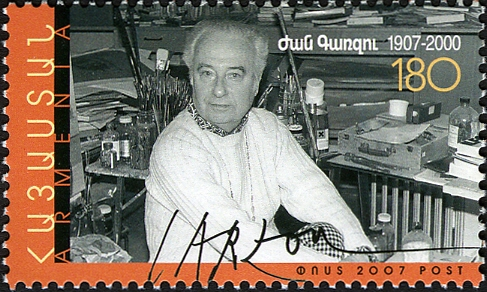
Carzou on a 2007 Armenian stamp

Jean Marie Carzou (Armenian: Ժան Գառզու, born in Aleppo; 1 January 1907 – 12 August 2000) was a French–Armenian artist, painter, and illustrator, whose work illustrated the novels of Ernest Hemingway and Albert Camus.

== Life and career ==
Carzou was born Karnik Zouloumian (Armenian: Գառնիկ Զուլումեան) in Aleppo, Syria to an Armenian family. Carzou later created his name from the first syllables of his name and surname, and added a Parisian nickname, "Jean". He was educated in Cairo, Egypt before moving to Paris in 1924 to study architecture.

He started working as a theater decorator but quickly realized he preferred drawing and painting. In 1938, more than a hundred exhibitions of his works were organized in Paris, in the French provinces and abroad. In 1949, he received the coveted Hallmark prize.

In 1952, he created costumes and sceneries for Les Indes Galantes of Rameau at the Opéra de Paris. He continued with Le Loup (1953) for "Les Ballets" of Roland Petit, Giselle (1954) and Athalie (1955) at the Opéra and "La Comédie française".

Carzou was elected a member of the Institut de France, Académie des beaux-arts, succeeding in the seat left vacant by the death of painter Jean Bouchaud in 1977. He was also awarded the National Order of Merit of France.

A Carzou museum exists in the town of Dinard (Brittany).

== Collections ==
Carzou's work is held in the permanent collections of several institutions, including the Hermitage Museum, the Centre Pompidou Museum, the University of Michigan Museum of Art, the Art Institute of Chicago, the Mount Holyoke College Art Museum, and the Fine Arts Museums of San Francisco.

== Awards ==
- National Order of Merit
