= Achille Zo =

French painter (1826–1901)

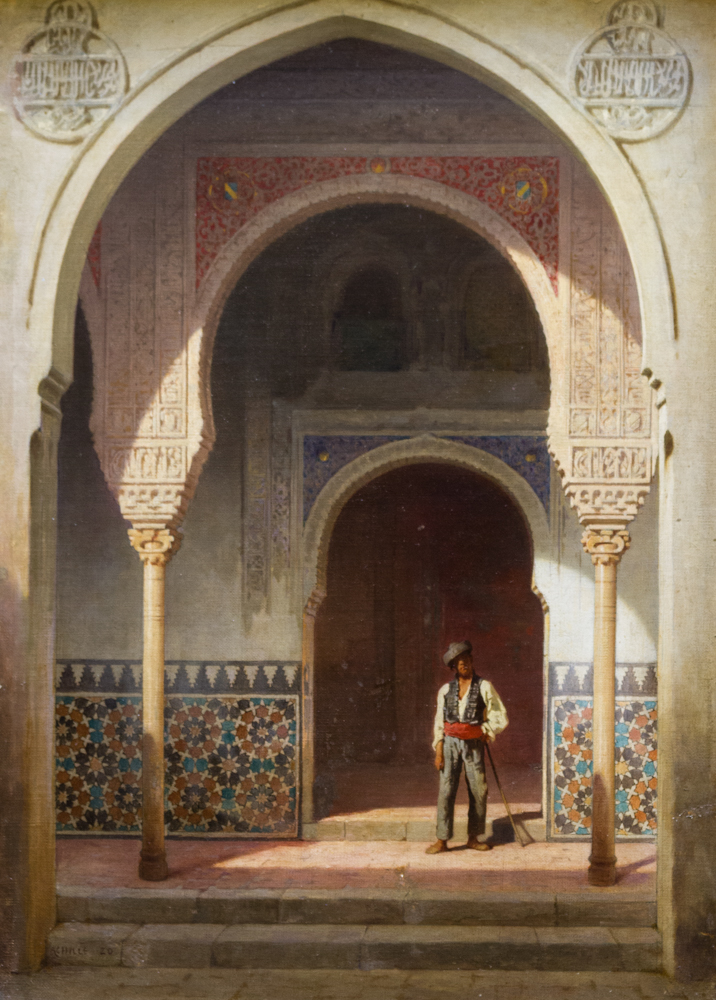
Patio of the Alhambra (1860)

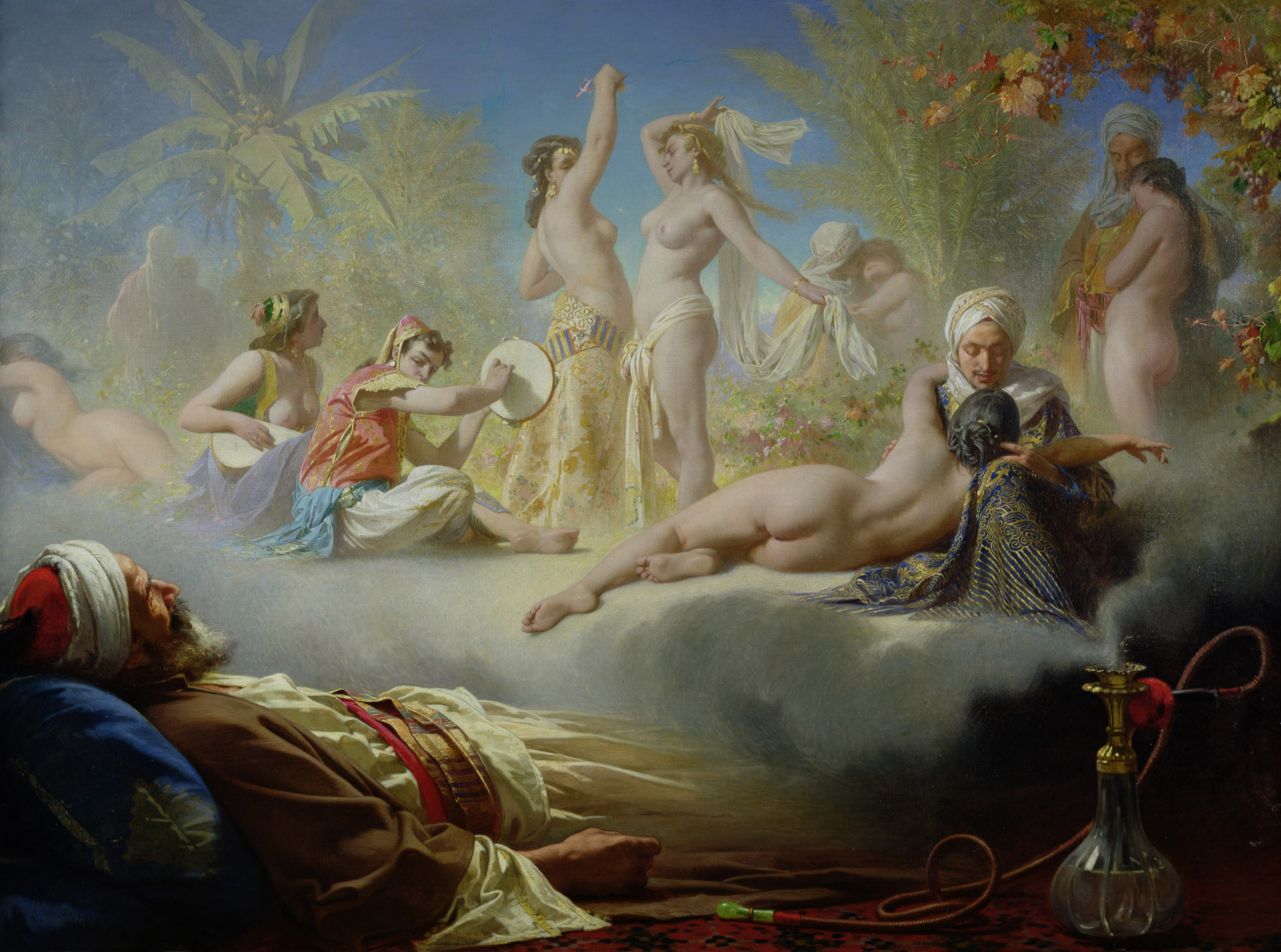
The Believer's Dream (1870)

Achille Zo (born Jean-Baptiste Achille Zo; 30 July 1826 – 2 March 1901) was a French painter of Basque origin. He painted in the academic style with many historical works and genre scenes, especially from Spain.

== Biography ==
He was born in Bayonne. After losing his father at the age of 14, Zo first became an apprentice house painter while taking drawing lessons at the Bayonne Académie de dessin, receiving many prizes for his work. He then spent a few years working in a theatre decoration studio in Bordeaux before going to Paris in 1846 where he joined Thomas Couture, working in his studio for two years and receiving instruction in academic painting.

Unable to make a living in the capital, Zo had to return to Bordeaux but was back in Paris in 1852 when he exhibited a painting at the Salon de l'Académie de Peinture titled Marchands d'esclaves. As a result of its success, he was able to undertake a lengthy journey to Spain where he completed sketches as a basis for his future work. He was to return to Spain on several occasions, notably in 1856 (Madrid) and in 1860 (Andalucia).

For a number of years Zo painted historical subjects and Spanish genre scenes. His Gitanos du Monte Sagrado à Grenade and Famille de bohémiens en voyage fared quite well at the Salon in 1861. His Marchand de fruits à Séville, picked out by a critic in 1864, was purchased soon after the king of Portugal. In 1868, the Tribunal des Rois Mores à l'Alhambra de Grenade, purchased by the French State, earned him a gold medal at the Salon.

In the late 1860s, Zo turned from Spanish scenes to orientalism, exhibiting Rêve du croyant (The Believer's Dream) at the 1870 Salon. It showed one of Muhammad's disciples discovering the splendors of paradise while smoking a hookah, revealing a fanciful approach to Islam and the widely held western view of oriental piety.

Upset by the Siege of Paris, in 1871 he returned to Bayonne where he opened a studio while heading the city's Ecole de dessin. He was also appointed custodian of the Musée de Peintures et des Décors de Théâtre. He no longer exhibited in Paris, concentrating on local exhibitions. He died in 1901 in Bordeaux.

His son, Henri-Achille Zo, also became a well known painter and illustrator.
