= Clément Brun =

French painter

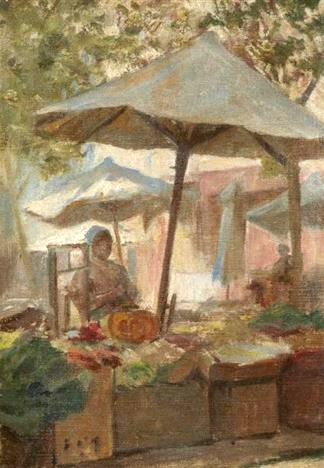
Market Stall at the Place Pie, Avignon

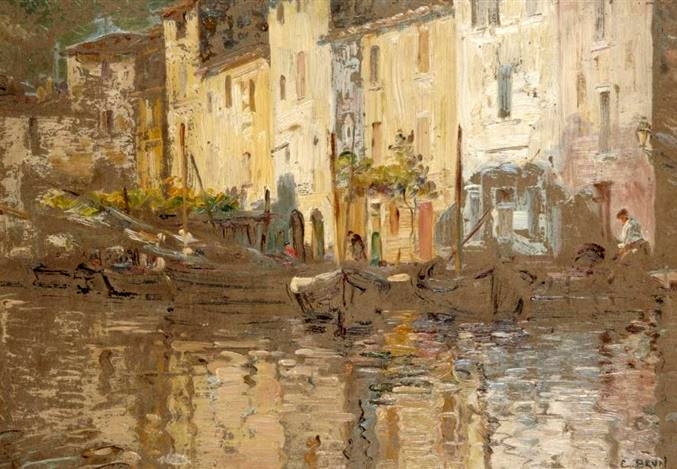
View of Martigues

Gérard Clément-Brun (11 September 1865, in Avignon – 11 March 1920, in Avignon) was a French portrait and cityscape painter. Some sources give his year of birth as 1867 or 1868.

== Biography ==
He began his studies at the École des Beaux-Arts d'Avignon, under the tutelage of Pierre Grivolas, who advised him to study in Paris. There, he enrolled at the École des Beaux-Arts, where he studied with William Bouguereau and Tony Robert-Fleury. Later, he entered the Académie Julian, where his instructors were Gabriel Ferrier and Jules Joseph Lefebvre

Upon returning to Avignon, he established and chaired the Groupe des Treize which, among many others, included the painters Lina Bill, Jules Flour, Joseph Hurard, Alfred Lesbros and Joseph Meissonnier. They held their first exhibit in 1912 at the Hôtel de Ville d'Avignon (City Hall)

In 1913, he obtained a silver medal at the Salon with his painting Le Raccommodeur de faïence (The Earthenware Mender)

A large collection of his works may be seen at the Musée Calvet in Avignon.
