= Arthur Watson Sparks =

American painter

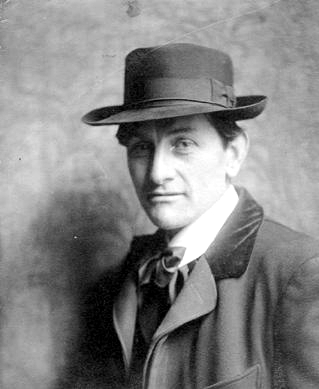
Arthur Watson Sparks (date unknown)

Arthur Watson Sparks (1870/71, Washington, D.C. - 6 August 1919, Philadelphia) was an American painter and art teacher.

== Biography ==
He was born to Mary and Frederick Sparks, a federal government clerk. He was apprenticed to an architect but also took private painting lessons from Howard Helmick. His progress there encouraged him to enroll at the Corcoran Art School. After some time at Corcoran the Director, E. F. Andrews, appointed him to the sensitive position of monitor in the "painting from life" (nude) art classes.

In 1898 he won a design competition, along with his collaborator J. Elfreth Watkins, chief of buildings for the United States National Museum, for a proposed "Hall of American Inventions" to be built at the Exposition Universelle (1900). As a result, he was given a place on the installation committee and went to Paris. While there, he took employment that provided him the means to study at the Académie Julian with Jean-Paul Laurens. After two years there, he transferred to the École des Beaux-Arts, where he studied with Fernand Cormon and William Bouguereau. He remained in Paris for ten years altogether; taking numerous trips to the Mediterranean coast and North Africa.

He returned to the United States in 1908, when Arthur Hamerschlag, head of Andrew Carnegie's new Carnegie Technical Schools, in Pittsburgh, Pennsylvania, hired him to be the founding head of the Department of Painting and Illustration. Very early on, he encountered resistance to his plans for the "painting from life" class, being told that using "a cow, a dog, or a calf" would be more decent, despite the fact that Carnegie himself had no objection to nudes. He eventually prevailed, and used human models throughout his tenure there. While teaching, he continued to paint and participated in numerous exhibitions in Philadelphia, Chicago and New York.

He resigned his post in 1919, intending to live at the art colony in New Hope, Pennsylvania; where he would join his old friend, Edward Redfield. Before he got there, however, he contracted the "Spanish flu" and died in Philadelphia. His works remained little known until the 1960s, when interest in them was revived.

== Selected paintings ==
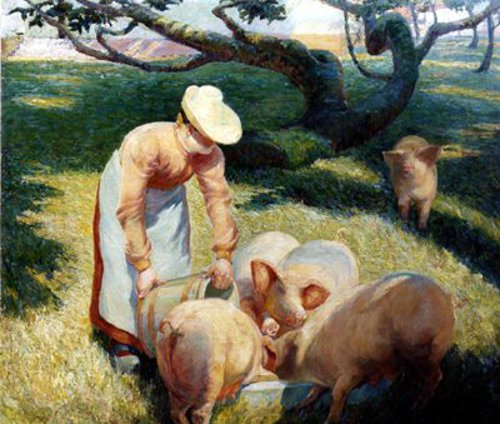
The Pigs' Meal

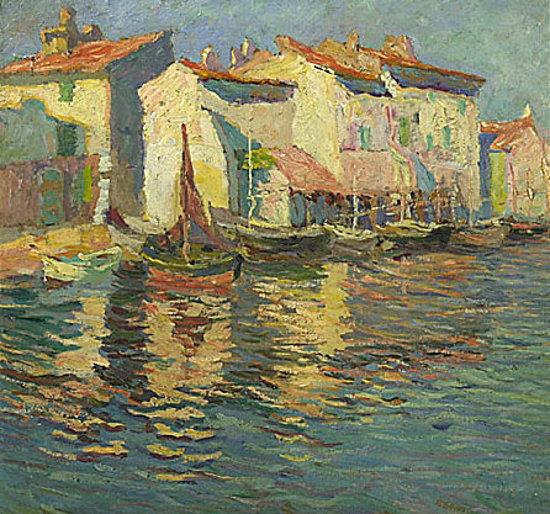
A Bright Day at Martigues

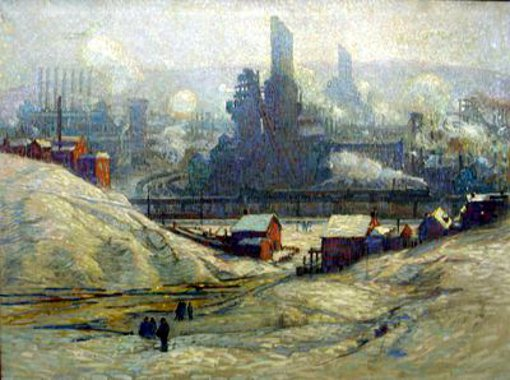
Steel Mills

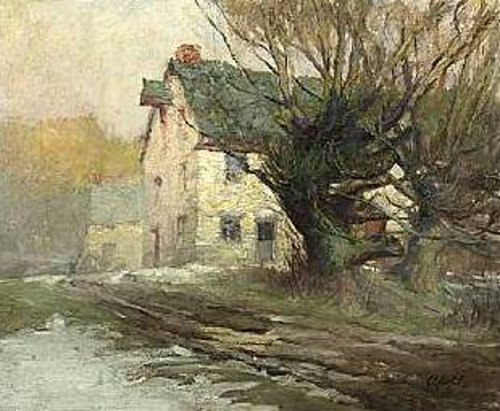
The Mill at Carversville

== Sources ==
- Chew, Paul A. (1963). Arthur Watson Sparks, American Impressionist : [exhibition] the Westmoreland County Museum of Art, Greensburg, Pennsylvania, December 7, 1963 through January 21, 1964. Greensburg: Westmoreland County Museum of Art.
- Fenton, Edwin (2000). Carnegie Mellon 1900–2000: A Centennial History. Pittsburgh: Carnegie Mellon University Press. ISBN 0-88748-323-2.
- Patricia Lowry (2007). Pittsburgh Post-Gazette: The Story of Rankin. Retrieved December 27, 2007.
- Gerdts, William H., Art across America: Two Centuries of Regional Painting 1710-1920. New York: Abbeville Press, 1990, vol. 1, pp. 295–297 ISBN 978-1-55859-033-5
