= Irene E. Parmelee =

American painter

Irene E. Parmalee
- Born: 1847; Guilford, Connecticut
- Died: August 29, 1934; Los Angeles, California
- Education: Nathaniel Jocelyn, Yale Art School, Académie Julian
- Known for: Portraits

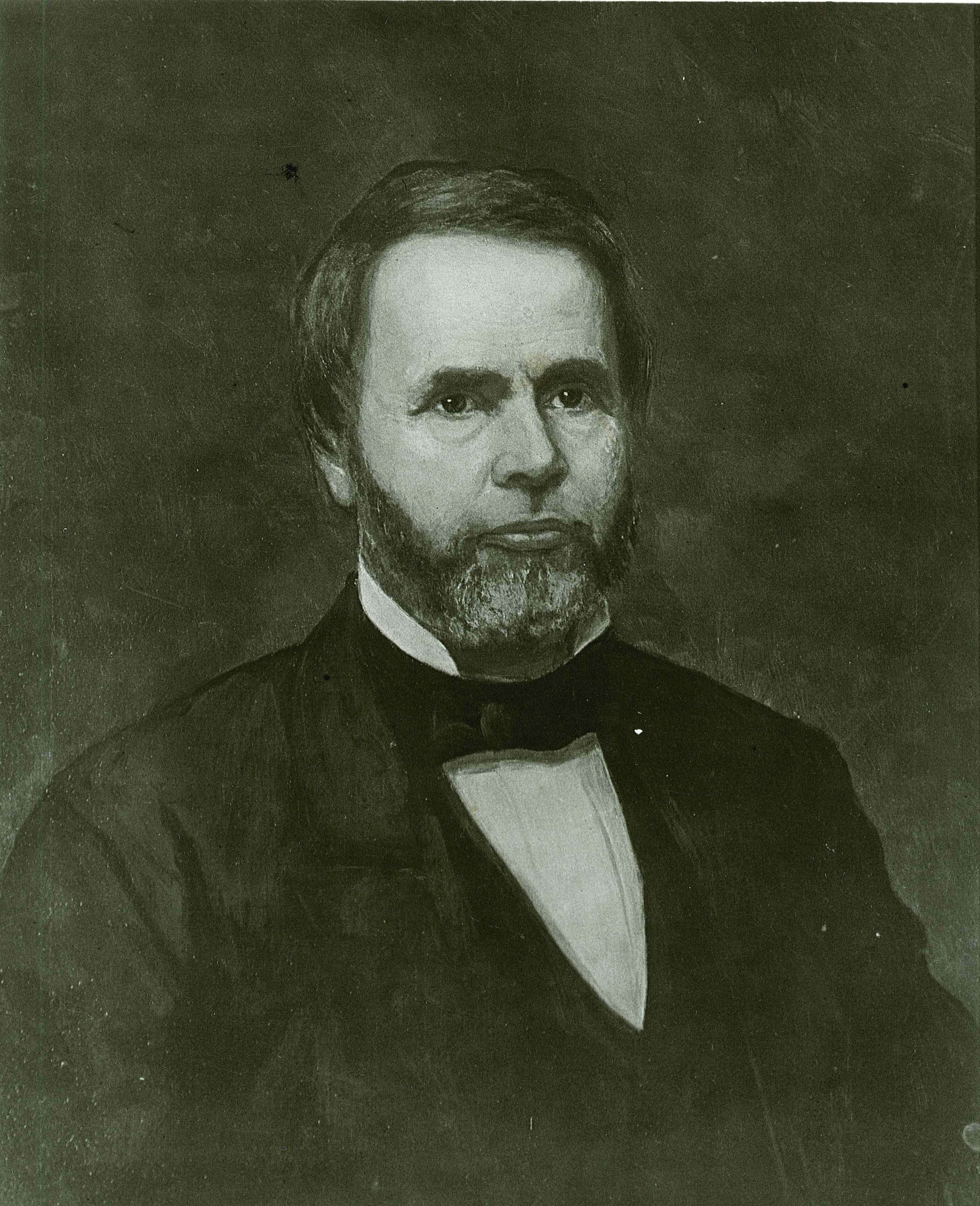
Henry Bronson (1804-1893), oil on canvas, 1881, Yale University Art Gallery

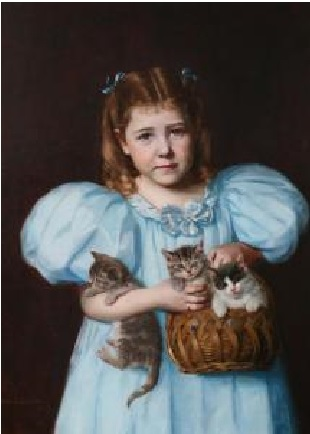
Young Girl with Kittens, 1895

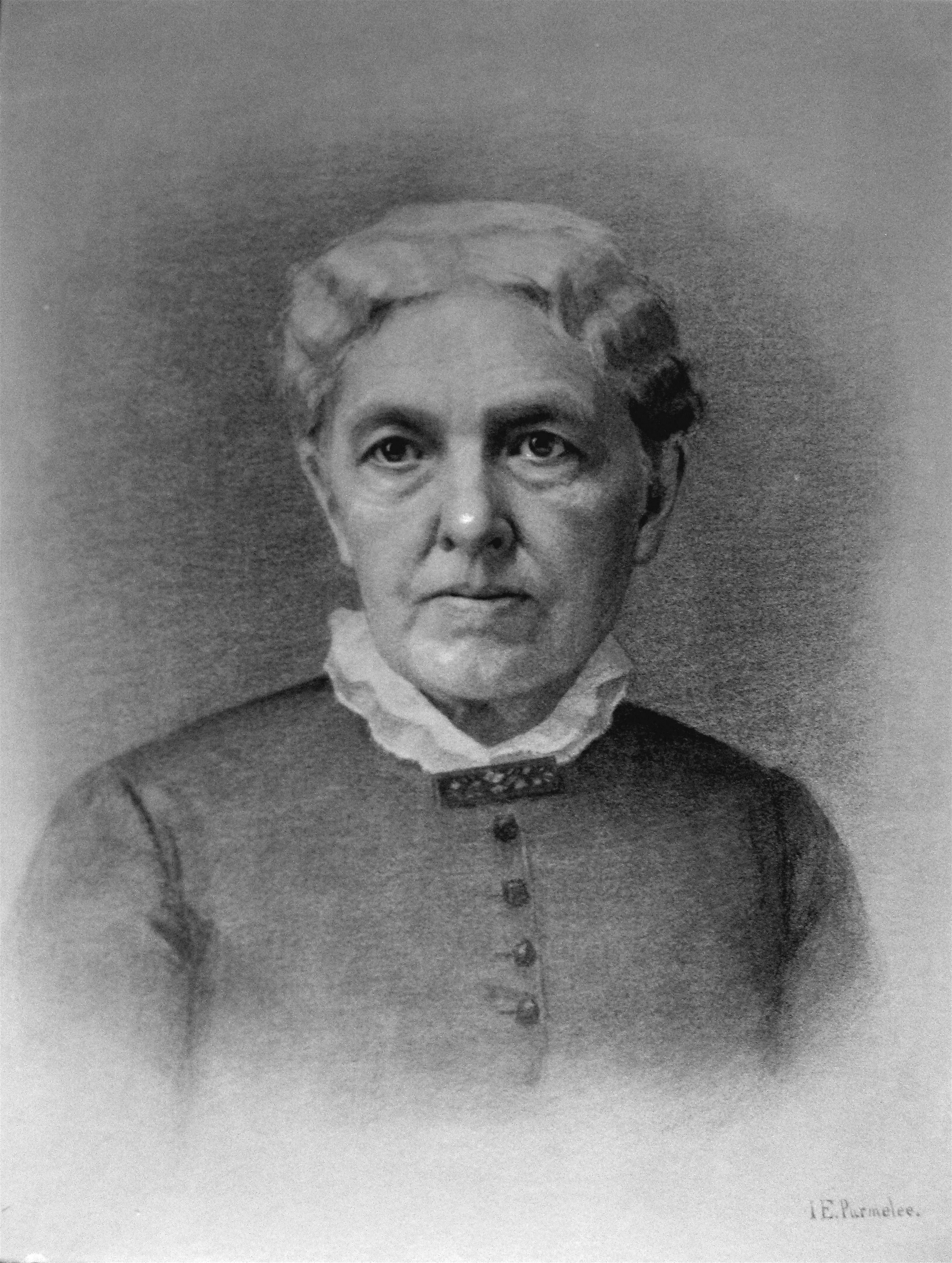
Portrait of Mrs. John R. Hixon, Springfield, Massachusetts

Irene E. Parmelee, her surname also spelled Parmely (1847 – 1934), was an American painter and portrait artist.

== Early life ==
Irene E. Parmelee born in Guilford, Connecticut. She was the daughter of Mary and Horton L. Parmelee, a farmer. Her older siblings were Emily, Charles, Mary, and Jane.

== Education ==
Parmelee studied under Henry Bryant of Hartford beginning in 1872 and the following year with Nathaniel Jocelyn in New Haven. She studied for a year at the Yale Art School, which had just begun admitting women, under Robert Walter Weir. Still stating to others that she was still a student, she opened a studio in Springfield, Massachusetts, in 1875.

Parmelee later traveled to Paris and attended the Académie Julian from 1881 to 1884 where she studied with Joseph-Nicolas Robert-Fleury, Pierre Auguste Cot, and Jules Joseph Lefebvre.

== Career ==
She was a career portrait artist and operated a studio in Springfield, Massachusetts, from 1875 to 1929. Parlee painted the portrait of Marcus Perrin Knowlton, Chief Justice of the Massachusetts Supreme Judicial Court, made after a photogravure, in 1912. It hung in the court house in Springfield following a formal presentation ceremony at the fourth annual Massachusetts Bar Association meeting in December of that year. She was paid $1,125 (equivalent to $36,161 in 2025) for the framed painting.

Parmelee made a portrait of Samuel Bowles, III, who was an editor of the Republican and a City Library Association member for 37 years and was on the board of directors for 24 years. His wife donated the portrait to the Springfield Library, which was hung next to a portrait of his father, Samuel Bowles, II.

== Death ==
She died on August 29, 1934, in Los Angeles, California.

== Works ==
A partial list of her paintings are:

- Amherst College, Mead Art Museum, Amherst, Massachusetts
  - Chester W. Chapin (b. 1798), oil, copy after Joseph Oriel Eaton
- George Walter Vincent Smith Art Museum, Springfield, Massachusetts
  - Horace Smith, oil, 1881
  - Horatio N. Case, oil, 1890
  - Charles M. Merriam, oil, 1890
  - Henry S. Lee, oil, 1891
  - James M. Thompson, oil, 1895
  - Ephraim Bond, oil, 1896
  - Samuel Bowles, oil, 1896
  - Dr. Josiah Gilbert Holland, oil, 1896
  - James Kirkham, oil, 1896
  - Everett Hosmer Barney, oil, 1903
  - John Olmsted, oil, 1903
  - Julius Appleton, oil, 1907
  - Chester Chapin, oil
  - Mrs. Timothy M. Walker, oil
- Maine State Museum, Augusta
  - Portrait of George Evans, oil, 1901
- Massachusetts Historical Society
  - Mrs. Edward Bates (Lucy Douglas Fowler) 1830-1916
- Museum of Fine Arts, Springfield, Massachusetts
  - Portrait of James Philip Gray, oil
- Unitarian Church, Boston, Massachusetts
  - John Wille, oil, 1886
- Yale University, School of Medicine, New Haven, Connecticut
  - Henry Bronson (1804-1893), oil on canvas, 1881
