= Jack Hooper (artist) =

American painter (1928–2014)

- Jack Hooper circa 1980
- Born: Jack Meredith Hooper; August 26, 1928; Los Angeles, California, United States
- Died: January 24, 2014 (aged 85); Laguna de Santa Maria del Oro, Mexico
- Education: AA, Art, Los Angeles City College; BA, Painting, magna cum laude, Mexico City College; Académie Julian; Académie de la Grande Chaumière; MA, Painting, University of California, Los Angeles
- Known for: Painting, Muralist, Sculpture, Printmaking
- Movement: Abstract expressionism, Mexican Muralism, Bay Area Figurative Movement, Generación de la Ruptura
- Children: 3

Jack Hooper (Jack Meredith Hooper or Jack M. Hooper) (August 26, 1928 - January 24, 2014) was an American painter, muralist, sculptor, printmaker and art educator. Hooper was a major figure on the Southern California art scene, belonging to that generation of Los Angeles painters who matured during the late 1950s and the 1960s, painters such as John Altoon, Sam Amato, Robert Irwin, Lee Mullican, William Brice and Billy Al Bengston. He was an innovator in the use of new materials, most importantly plastic in art. He is known for abstract expressionist, mural and figurative painting. Hooper has exhibited in art museums and galleries nationally and internationally including solo shows in Europe, Mexico and the United States. Modeling renown UCLA art professor and figurative artist, Jan Stussy, the last 20 years of his life were spent in rural Mexico, where he drew and painted every single day until his death.

== Early life and education ==
Born in 1928 to a family of modest means, Jack Hooper was close to his mother and aunt, a widow with whom they lived in Silver Lake, Los Angeles during the Great Depression. Recognized as gifted in art by family, he began art training in a Work Projects Administration (WPA) school at the age of twelve. After graduating from public high school, Hooper served as a communications officer in the United States Army Air Corps in Antarctica and Jamaica at the end of WW II. Using G.I. Bill education benefits after his military service, he earned an A.A., Art in 1951 from Los Angeles City College.

=== Undergraduate Study ===
But as a young artist, he sought a first-rate art education, and was therefore ultimately drawn to the vibrant art scene of Mexico and "The American College South Of The Border". "Mexico City in the 1950s has been compared to the Paris of the 20s 'where ideas, art, literature and revolution could be discussed' on and off campus, in the classrooms, the sidewalk cafés, and the all-night parties." This was a period of intense artistic and political dynamism for Hooper, influenced by Diego Rivera, Jose Clement Orozco and David Alfaro Siqueiros, the fathers of Mexican Muralism.

Hooper studied and graduated with a B.A., Painting in 1952, magna cum laude from Mexico City College. Following in the footsteps of Mexican muralist and MCC mural techniques and art history professor, Arnold Belkin, Hooper served as a mural assistant to Siqueiros in 1952 on "The Future Triumph of Medical Science Over Cancer" (1958) at Institute of Social Security Oncology Hospital. He did advanced studies under Siqueiros in raw synthetic paint media and their application to mural and easel painting. Siqueiros and Hooper pushed the use of acrylic paint rather than oil paint and experimented with sgraffito in painting murals. "I became close to Siqueiros, the leader of the Communist Party of Mexico, who was subject to frequent arrests by the authorities". Hooper knew many of the artists of the period, including Frida Kahlo who would become the subject of many of his portraits and studies over the coming decades.

=== Study Abroad - Europe ===
Upon the recommendation of UCLA instructor Stanton Macdonald-Wright to study to be a painter at the prestigious fine art schools in Europe, like he had done at the age of 19, Hooper attended the Académie Julian and did independent study at the Académie de la Grande Chaumière from 1952 to 1953. Both painting academies located in the 6th arrondissement of Paris were alternatives to the École des Beaux-Arts. His advanced studies were under André Planson, Pierre Jérôme, Roger Chapelain-Midy and Jean Bouchaud who were members of the Académie des Beaux-Arts, medalists at Salon of French Artists or Prix de Rome, and Knights or Officers of the French National Order of the Legion of Honour. Henri Matisse and cubist sculptor, Jacques Lipchitz were among the many great artists associated with the Académie Julian who Hooper, like Macdonald-Wright, considers to have been important influences in his development. Further independent study was done at Department of Graphic Arts of the Louvre, a daily haunt of Macdonald-Wright's. His first one-man show was at Galerie du Dragon, Paris.

=== Graduate Study ===
After working in Paris, Rome and London with extensive travel and independent study throughout Europe from 1954 to 1955, Hooper returned to the US in 1956 to pursue graduate study in at University of California, Los Angeles (UCLA). He found a natural affinity with the transforming post-World War II Southern California art scene. In Los Angeles, there were three major currents for new ideas led by Lorser Feitelson, Rico Lebrun and Stanton Macdonald-Wright. Lebrun did figurative work, highly romantic, affected by Picasso. Feitelson represented constructivism, or non-objective art. Macdonald-Wright with Jan Stussy and Gordon Nunes at UCLA as his protégés, practiced Synchromism. "They were part of the 1st generation of artists released from the requirements of completely representational paintings. Perhaps they accomplished what they did because no one in this 'new world' cared about the maintenance of artistic traditions. This group was uniquely free to pursue an artistic spirit which was fresh, challenging and explosive." (art dealer Frank Goss)

Many colleges had grown large art faculties to deal with the influx of veterans. UCLA hired impressive new instructors Frederick S. Wight, Sam Amato, William Brice (a protégé of Rico Lebrun) and John Paul Jones. Fellow graduate students included Roland Reiss, Craig Kauffman, James McGarrell, Les (William) Kerr, Ray Brown, Idelle (Feinberg) Weber, all of whom became prominent modern artists and some art professors. During summer 1956, Hooper did special study with and became a studio assistant to Rico Lebrun. It was in this West Coast Modernist School that Hooper received his M.A., Painting in 1958.

== Early career ==
=== Teaching ===
While working toward his master's degree, Hooper became a teaching assistant at UCLA in 1956 and was appointed Associate in Art, Drawing & Painting in 1957. In 1958, he received joint appointment as Art Associate and Art Coordinator and Liaison Officer for University Extension, founded by his mentor Jan Stussy. He showed his work in group and solo exhibitions at Southern California museums and galleries, including UCLA Art Galleries with fellow faculty. He received the prestigious Art in America Award, "New Talent in America" (painting) (1958). Hooper was among 13 cash prize winners of the 1959 annual Los Angeles County Museum Exhibition of "Artists of Los Angeles and Vicinity," whose jury included famed Bay Area Figurative Movement painter, Elmer Bischoff. Art critic and curator Jules Langsner wrote of his solo show at Bertha Lewinson Gallery, "It is in the drawings of voluptuous females that Hooper is seen to greater advantage. His skimming, undulating line is at once sinuous and decisive."

In the summers of 1960 and 1962, Hooper was a Visiting Professor of Art at the University of Colorado, Boulder. While there, he began a multi-year exploration and application of innovative artist materials, mainly coating and "otting" materials used in industry, to easel and mural painting with Roland Reiss, who held the senior painting teaching position, and the sculptor, De Wain Valentine. He returned to UCLA for an Assistant Professor of Art appointment in 1961. An eight-year relationship with Mount Saint Mary's College in Los Angeles began in 1962 when he was appointed Assistant Professor Art, and later became the Chairman of the Art Department and the Director of Galleries. In September 1964, Hooper curated the first exhibition of paintings and sculpture by famed artist Lee Mullican in Southern California since 1961, among many other gallery shows at Mount St. Mary's.

=== Innovations ===
During 1962–1966, Hooper directed "Sculpture Walls Architectural Murals" in Los Angeles and executed 14 murals. Further explorations of the ancient technique of "Sgraffito" using heavy industrial spray equipment and layers of scraped wet plaster led to over 3000 square feet of murals for public and private structures in the Los Angeles area, with over 30 tons of materials. Art critics applauded his pioneering use of new and innovative materials, such as polyurethane foam and epoxy, in work shown at regional and national group and solo exhibitions. Arnold Gassan, writes about Hooper and his peers' leadership in plastic arts, "The revolution is primarily technical, and is of ultimate importance to all working artists. The introduction of plastics into expressive forms may well be as significant as the medieval introduction of oil in painting". Artforum featured him in a special Issue on "Sculpture in California" for his plastic relief paintings and reviewed his work seven times in four years. "Probably the handsomest piece in the show is Jack Hooper's large bas-relief-painting...Hooper's plastic organizations remains powerfully two-dimensional and painterly." In 1965, Long Beach Museum of Art awarded him a purchase prize for "Emergence," a painting relief using plastics exhibited at "Three California Painters."

Hooper participated in, among others, traveling invitational shows at the Whitney Museum of American Art in New York, San Francisco Museum of Modern Art, Amon Carter Museum of Art, Oakland Art Museum and Long Beach Museum of Art. Catalogues of national exhibitions that featured his work were "Fifty California Artists," "The Artist's Environment: West Coast," "Arts of Southern California - VIII: Drawing," "Art Across America Far West" and "Fifty Paintings by Thirty-Seven Artists of the Los Angeles Area." Richard Diebenkorn, Sam Francis, Morris Graves, Clyfford Still, Mark Tobey, Nathan Oliveira and Mark Rothko. were among the over 100 invited artists in these shows. Primus Stuart Gallery began representing Hooper in 1961, and later David Stuart Galleries, whose list of artists included Joan Brown, Emerson Woelffer and Peter Voulkos. A year earlier at the age of 32, his work became a part of the Historical Archives of Contemporary Art of São Paulo Biennial, Brazil.

At the end of this time, he co-founded Aesthetic Research Center (A.R.C.) with architect, Frank Gehry, to foster collaboration between professionals in all fields of technology and the creative arts. Congruent with this focus, he resigned his post at Mount Saint Mary's College in 1969 to pursue and reorient his professional career in painting. In the following years, his teaching mantra "a great painting is captured in a single brushstroke" would recapture his heart as a painter and his return to the human form.

== Awards ==
- 1983 First Prize for Graphics, Central California Biennial, Pacific Grove Art Center, CA
- 1965 Purchase Award, "Emergence" relief sculpture, Long Beach Museum of Art, CA
- 1959 Junior Art Council Award, Annual Exhibition—"Artists of Los Angeles and Vicinity," Los Angeles County Museum of Art, CA
- 1958 Art in America Award, "New Talent in America" (painting)
- 1957 Honorable Mention, "Invitational Collage Exhibit", Exodus Gallery, San Pedro, CA
- 1957 Honorable Mention, "The First Annual Los Angeles Area Drawing Exhibition," Exodus Gallery, San Pedro, CA

== Selected solo shows ==
- 2016 Galleria Tile, San Francisco, CA
- 2008 "The Figurative Work of Jack Hooper, " Thomas Reynolds Gallery, San Francisco, CA
- 1996 Marina Gallery, Puerto Vallarta, Mexico
- 1995 Galeria Uno, Puerto Vallarta, Mexico
- 1991 Stremmel Gallery, Reno, NV
- 1987 "JACK HOOPER: Portraits of the Family," Vorpal Gallery, San Francisco. CA
- 1986 San Jose Institute of Contemporary Art, San Jose. CA
- 1984 Vorpal Gallery, San Francisco. CA and New York (SoHo), NY
- 1982 Vorpal Gallery, New York (SoHo), NY
- 1981 Vorpal Gallery, San Francisco. CA
- 1980 Los Robles Gallery, Palo Alto, CA
- 1978 Santa Cruz Municipal Gallery, Santa Cruz, CA
- 1976 Re-Vision Gallery, Santa Monica, CA
- 1975 "Twenty Year Retrospective", Mary Porter Sesnon Gallery, College Five and Eloise Pickard Smith Gallery, Cowell College University of California, Santa Cruz, CA (catalogue)
- 1974 Re-Vision Gallery, Santa Monica, CA
- 1968 Mount Saint Mary's College Galleries, Los Angeles, CA
- 1966 Canyon Gallery, Los Angeles, CA
- 1965 "Recent Drawings Jack Hooper," Sabrina Gallery, Los Angeles, CA
- 1964 "Jack Hooper: Relief Paintings," David Stuart Galleries, Santa Monica, CA
- 1963 Roberts Art Gallery, Santa Monica, CA
- 1962 "Hooper," Primus-Stuart Galleries, Los Angeles, CA
- 1960 Long Beach Museum of Art, Long Beach, CA
- 1959 "Hooper," Bertha Lewinson Gallery, Los Angeles, CA
- 1953 Falk-Raboff Gallery, Beverly Hills, CA
- 1953 Galerie du Dragon, Paris, France

== Collections ==
- de Young and Legion of Honor, Fine Arts Museums of San Francisco, CA
- Stanford University Museum of Art, CA
- Long Beach Museum of Art, CA
- University of California, Los Angeles, CA
- University of California, Santa Cruz, CA
- The Lannan Foundation, FL
- The Arnovick Foundation, Los Altos, CA
