= Andrea Robbi =

Swiss artist (1864–1945)

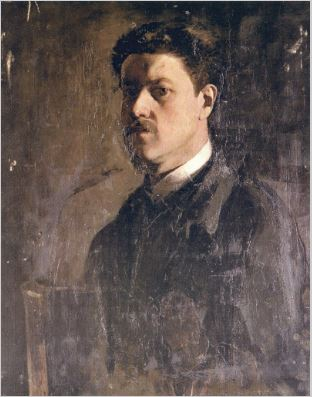
Self-portrait (c.1897)

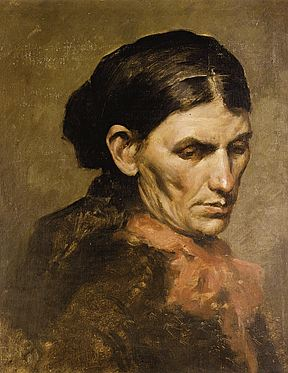
Portrait of the Artists' Mother

Andrea Robbi (28 May 1864, Carrara - 25 February 1945, Samedan) was a Swiss landscape painter and watercolorist.

== Biography ==
His father, who was from Sils in Engadin and his mother, who was from Davos, worked in Carrara and Saluzzo as confectioners. When he became old enough, he was sent off to school, first in Sils, then in Chur. His older brother and younger sister had both died by then.

Beginning in 1887, he studied with Karl Raupp at the Academy of Fine Arts Munich. From 1888 to 1891, he attended the Académie Julian in Paris, then went to stay at the Villa Strohl-Fern, an artists' residence in Rome. In 1895, he moved to Milan to copy the Old Masters. He also took some additional lessons with Barthélemy Menn in Geneva.

His father's sudden death in 1898 had a profound effect on him, and he retired to the family home in Sils, which he shared with his mother. Soon, he was spending all of his time alone, in the darkness. There has been much speculation as to what caused this behavior, although the loss of his father appears to have coincided with being rejected by an exhibition venue, and his mother's disapproval of a woman he loved.

After his mother died in 1907, he lived the rest of his life with the shutters drawn and little light, venturing out only occasionally for a brief walk after dark. Every few days, the property overseer's children would bring him some baskets of food as, later, would their children. One day, when he failed to respond, he was found inside, nearly frozen, and taken to the hospital. He died there the next day.

He painted steadily for only ten years, mostly before 1898, and never sold a painting. His work remained unknown until the 1980s, when it was rediscovered by the local sculptor, Giuliano Pedretti. It is now on display at the Sils Museum; operated by the Andrea Robbi Foundation.
