= Antony Troncet =

French painter

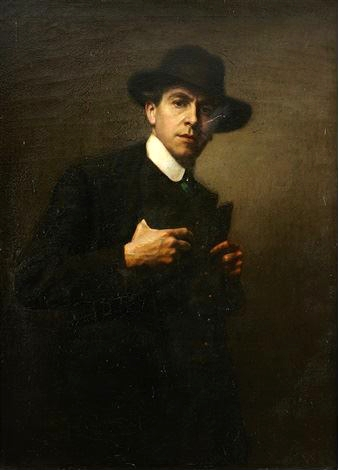
Presumed Self-portrait (1919)

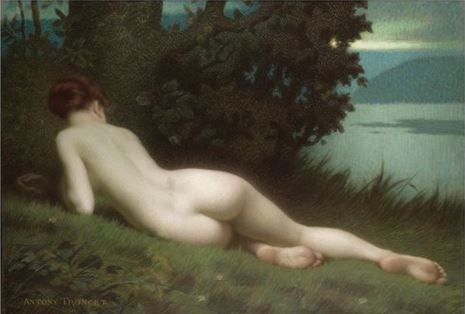
On the Lake Shore

Félix Maurice Antony Troncet (23 May 1879, Buzançais - 26 March 1939, Paris) was a French watercolorist, pastelist, engraver and illustrator. He is best remembered for portraits, nudes and genre scenes.

== Biography ==
He studied in Paris at the École Nationale Supérieure des Beaux-Arts and at the Académie Julian, with Jean-Joseph Benjamin-Constant and Jean-Paul Laurens

On several occasions he competed, unsuccessfully, for the Prix de Rome, but received honorable mentions. In 1914, his portrait of Marie Bonaparte was given critical praise at the Salon. During World War I, he was assigned to the Camouflage Service, together with many prominent artists.

After 1921, he became a regular contributor to the Salon; mostly with genre pieces, featuring young ladies, as well as a portrait of his mother (1926). His nude "On the Lake Shore", also attracted some attention, followed by a series of pastel nudes in the 1930s. On a more serious note, he received critical praise for his portrait of Marshall Louis Franchet d'Espèrey in 1932

He also wrote some poetry. Although most of it has been given attention, he was awarded the Prix Lefèvre-Deumier in 1934 for Ut pictura poesis, a series of poems about "forgotten" artists.

His works may be seen at the Musée Bertrand, as well as in the United States at the Minneapolis Institute of Art.
