= Maurice Tastemain =

French painter and stained glass artist

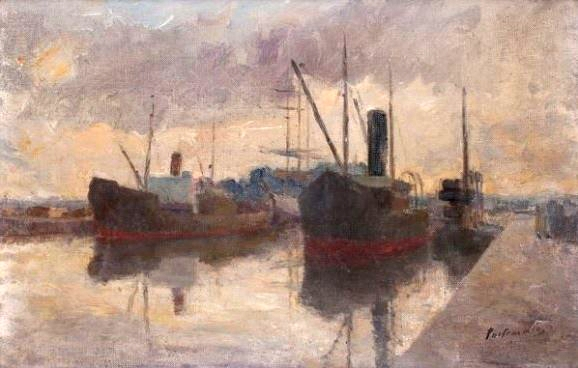
The Port of Caen

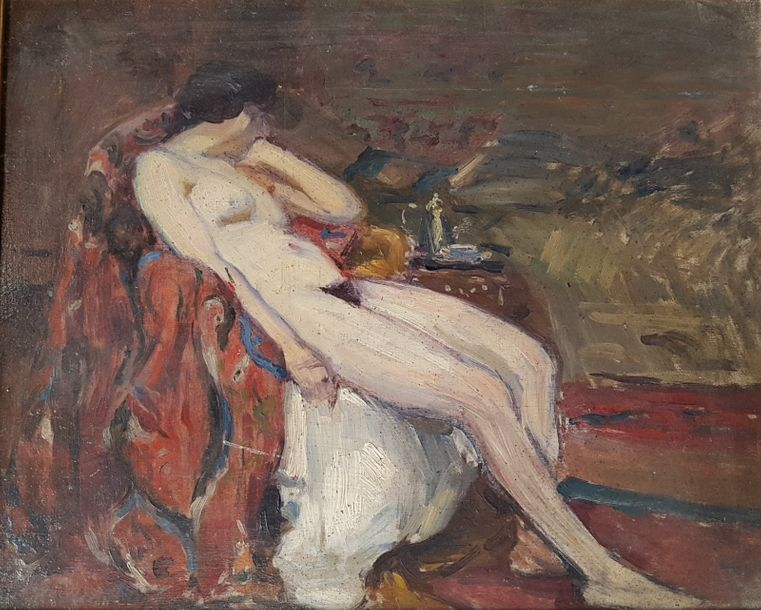
Young Lady Asleep in an Armchair

Pierre Maurice Eugène Tastemain (6 September 1878, Caen – March 1944, Paris) was a French painter and stained glass artist.

== Biography ==
His artistic talents were noticed by his teachers at an early age, so he became the student of the local artist and Professor, Gustave Ménégoz (1858–1934). In 1894, he participated in a competition organized by the Société Nationale des Beaux-Arts. Having passed his bachelor's exam, he headed for Paris in 1897, with a recommendation from Jules Louis Rame, another teacher in Caen with whom he had studied.

There, he entered the Académie Julian and worked in the studios of Raphaël Collin. He took two trips to Italy, and was introduced to stained glass techniques. In 1906, he took some additional training with Ferdinand Humbert. That same year, he had his first exhibit at the Salon.

After serving in the Army during World War I, he was commissioned to do restorative glass work at several churches in Paris. Eventually, he was successful enough to buy a country home in Clécy, where he spent his summers.

He continued to exhibit frequently, winning a bronze medal at the Exposition Internationale des Arts et Techniques dans la Vie Moderne in 1937. The following year, he was named a Knight in the Legion of Honor.

In 2007, a major retrospective was held at the Musée Charles Léandre in Condé-sur-Noireau.

== Source ==
- "Maurice Tastemain", Dictionnaire Bénézit, Oxford Art Online, 2011 ISBN 978-0-19-977378-7
