= Alfred Lesbros =

French painter

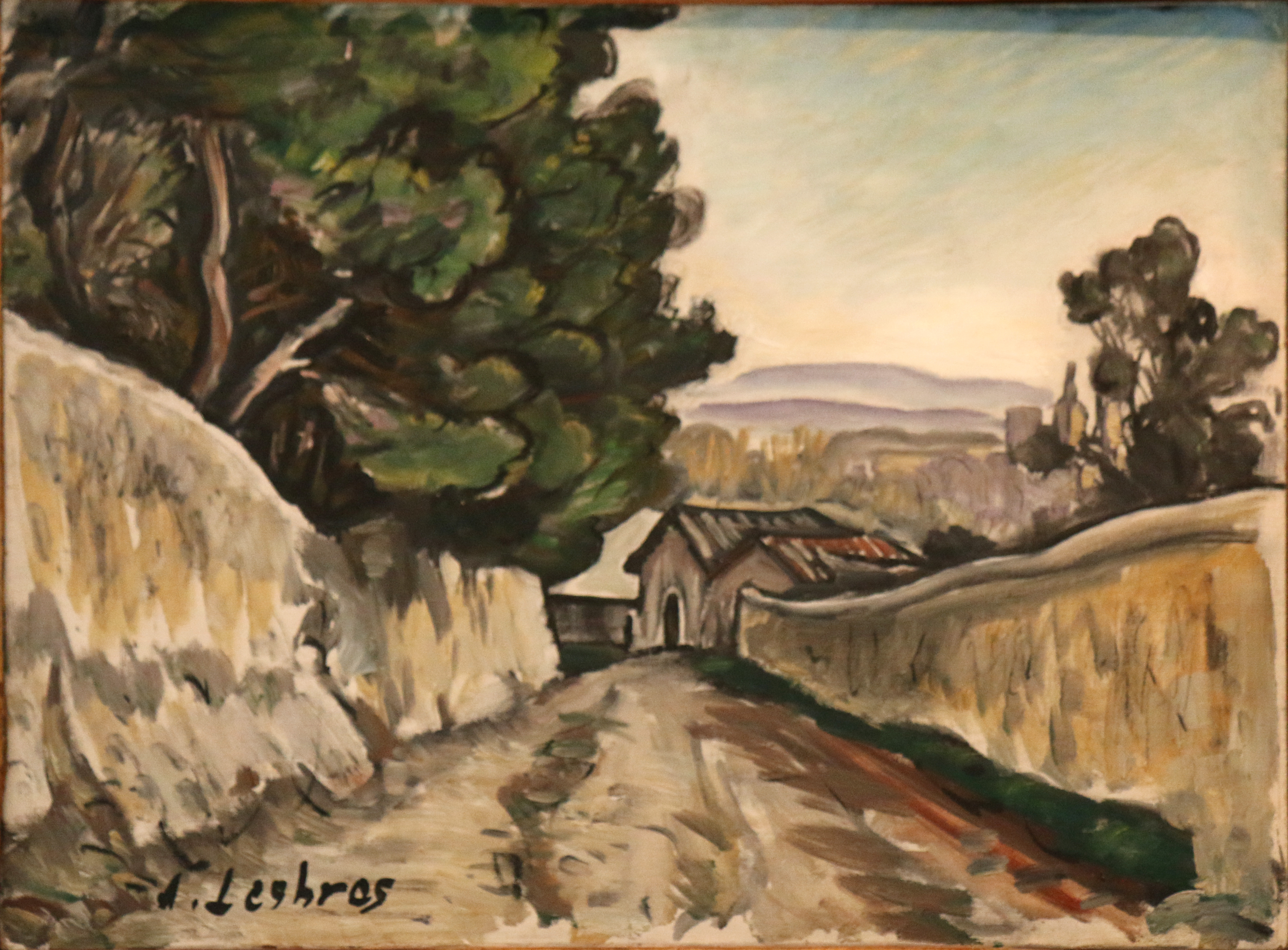

Alfred Lesbros (1873–1940) was a French painter born in Montfavet, near Avignon, France. He painted approximately a thousand works that can be seen in museums and public collections in Aix-en-Provence, Arles, Avignon, Marseille, Montpellier and Tournon. Some of his works have gained interest and local fame: "La cour de la livrée de Thury", "Le jardin", "Footing" (Calvet Museum, Avignon). From impressionism to cubism, Alfred Lesbros took part in the artistic revolutions of the early twentieth century.

== Some works ==
- La Tour Philippe Le Bel, 1920
- Porte de Roussillon avec les plantes sauvages ou La Peau de la panthère, 1926
- Jardin du musée Calvet, 1927
- Le Pont Saint-Bénezet aux galets, 1927–1928
- Le Chemin à Villeneuve, 1928
- Rue Pente-Rapide à Avignon, 1932
- La Vierge au jardin, 1932
- Le Tournant de Barbentane, 1936
- Vallon des Grenadiers Sauvages, 1937
- Le Pont Saint-Bénezet, 1937
- Le Jardin fleuri, 1937
- Le Vieux Moulin à Barbentane, 1938
- La Maison rose, 1939
- La Cour de la livrée de Thury
- Le Jardin
- Promenade
- Maison en Provence

== Gallery ==
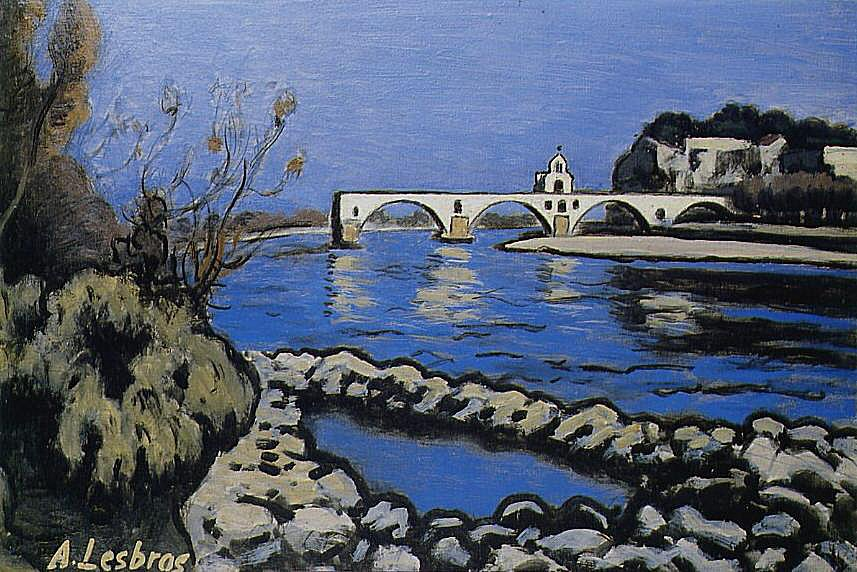
Le pont Saint-Bénezet aux galets, Oil on canvas, private collection

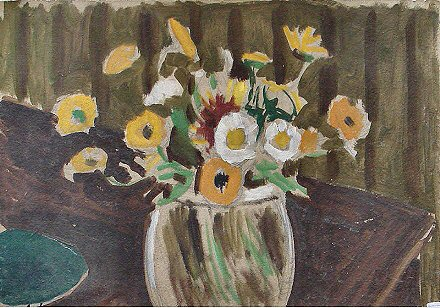
Anémones Blanches et Oranges, Oil on cardboard, private collection

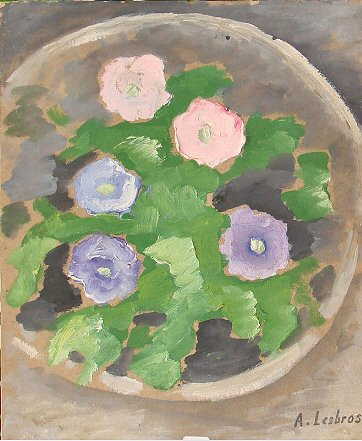
Renoncules, Oil on cardboard, private collection
