= Zofia Stankiewicz =

Polish painter (1862-1955)

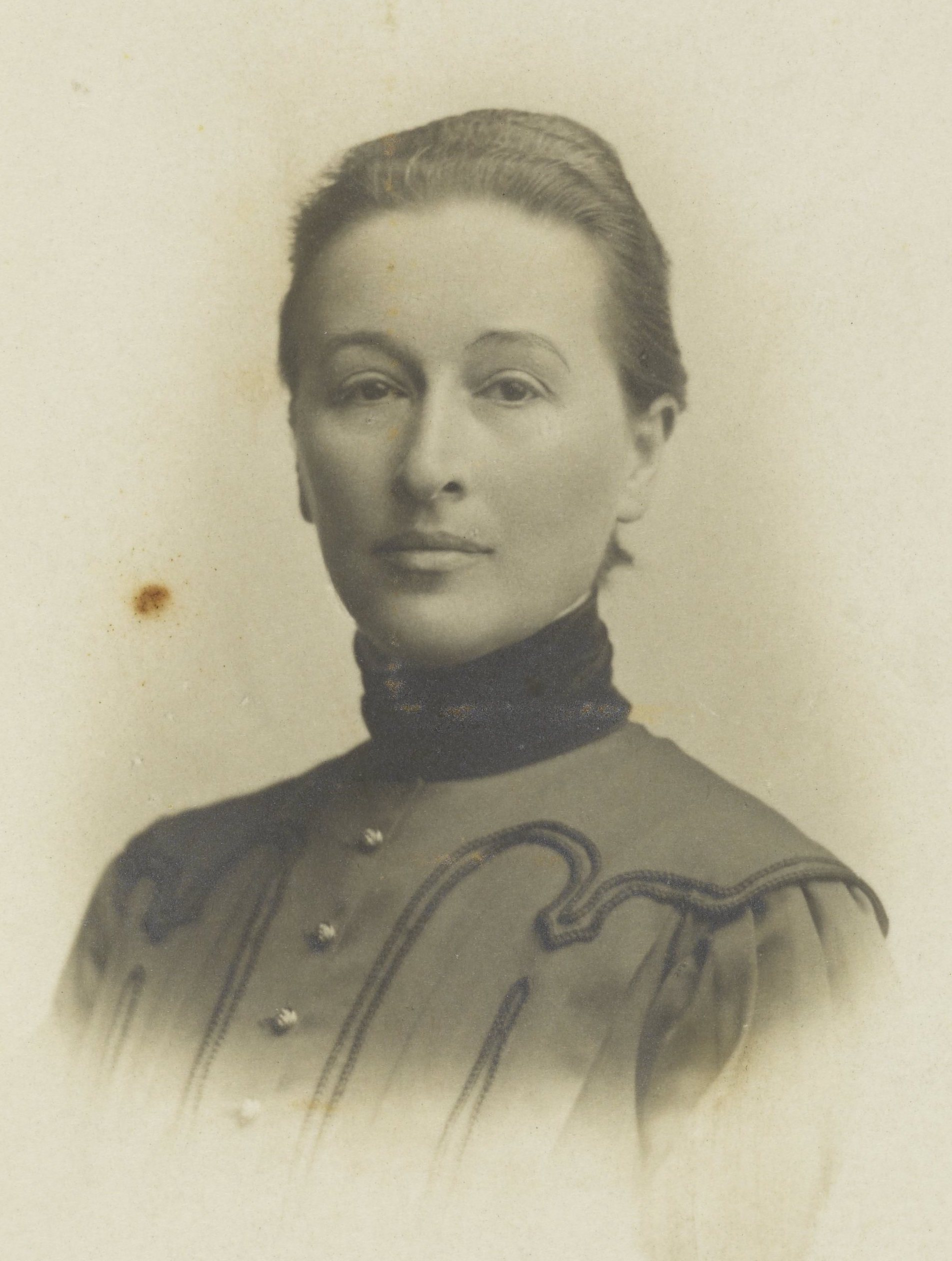
- Born: 14 September, 1862; Zhytomyr Oblast
- Died: 4 October 1955; Warsaw
- Burial place: Powązki Cemetery
- Occupations: painter, graphic designer
- Awards: Order of Polonia Restituta

Zofia Stankiewicz (born 14 September, 1862, in Zhytomyr Oblast – died 4 October 1955, in Warsaw) was a Polish painter, graphic designer, and feminist. She was awarded Order of Polonia Restituta.

== Life ==
Stankiewicz initially studied chemistry in Kharkiv. From 1876, she studied at the Wojciech Gerson Painting School in Warsaw and from 1880 at the Académie Julian in Paris, where she studied under Tony Robert-Fleury, Jean-Paul Laurens, and William-Adolphe Bouguereau. after returning to Warsaw, she also regularly visited the studios of painters such as Milosz Kotarbiński, Konrad Kryszanowski, and Kazimierz Stabrowski.

She lived mainly in Warsaw. In her early years, she illustrated magazines, painting mainly romantic landscapes (Ukrainian motifs) and still lifes.

Stankiewicz used metal, lithography and linocut techniques. her works were characterized by architectural motifs; many of her works depicted views of old Warsaw. In 1912, together with Ignacy Lupinski and Franciszek Siedlcki, she founded the Society of Friends of Graphic Arts.

In 1933, he was awarded the Honorary Prize of the City of Warsaw. Stankiewicz was buried at the Powązki Cemetery in Warsaw.
