= Johannes Martini (painter) =

German painter

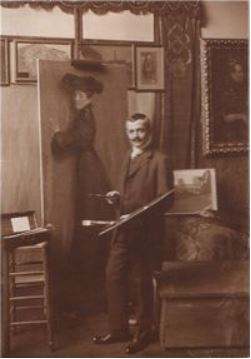
Martini in his studio (date unknown)

Johannes Martini (9 June 1866, in Chemnitz – 7 February 1935, in Munich) was a German oil painter and graphic artist.

== Biography ==
Martini was born in Chemnitz, Saxony. He was a student of Franz Skarbina at the Akademie der Künste of Berlin, and he spent two years at the Académie Julian in Paris. Martini exhibited his work at the Great Art Exhibition in Berlin and the Paris Salon. He participated in the jubilee exhibit for the 90th birthday of Luitpold of Bavaria, as well as the Annual Exhibition in Berlin's Glass Palace.

Martini spent much of his life in Munich, Bavaria, and lived in the city district of Schwabing. He was married and had one son.

Many of Martini's paintings are considered missing. A considerable part of his estate in the form of letters is dispersed among the private citizens of Munich.

Martini was a member of the German Art Cooperative (Allgemeinen Deutschen Kunstgenossenschaft or AdK) and the Munich art community. He was also a member of the Reichsverband bildendener Künstler (RVbK, "Reich Union for Visual Artists") and had many contacts, including with the Krupp and Siemens families and the Vatican.

== Gallery ==
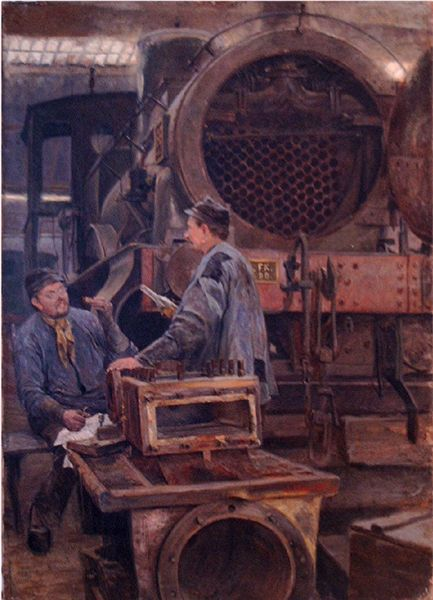
Breakfast in the Locomotive Workshop, ca. 1891.

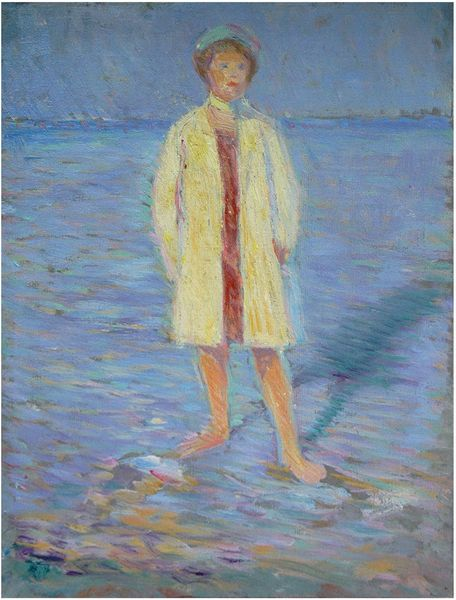
Girl in the Mudflats, ca. 1898

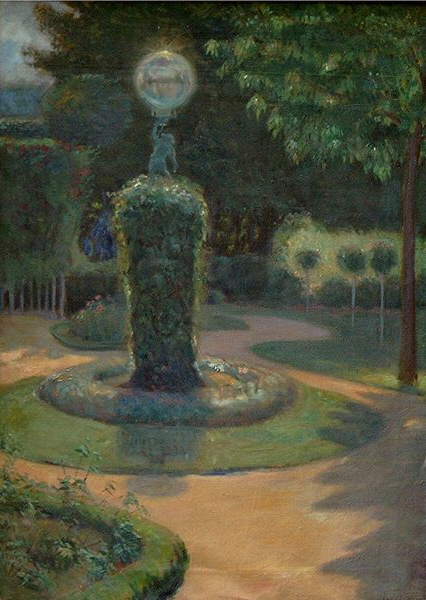
Park with Sculpture and a Lamp, ca. 1900.

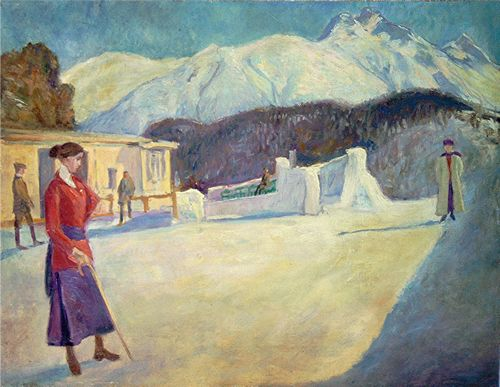
The Start of the Bobsled Run, St. Moritz, ca. 1905.

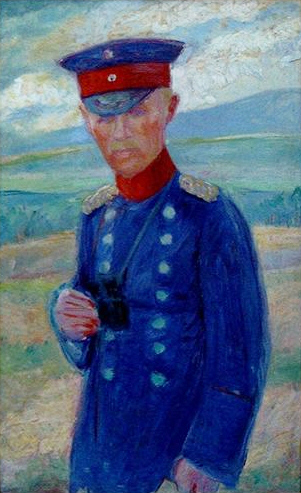
Wilhelm, German Crown Prince, ca. 1905.

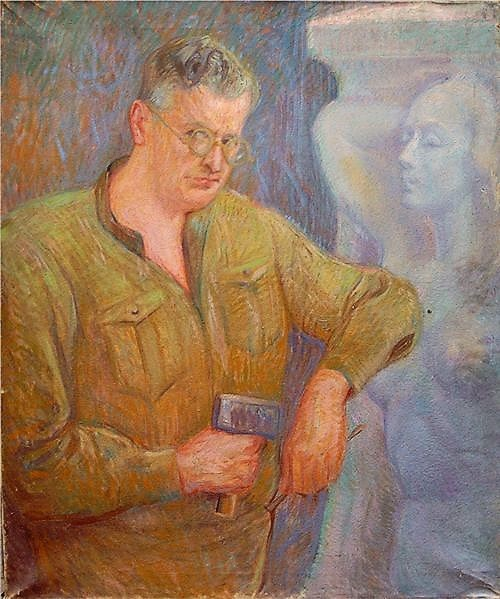
The Sculptor Fritz Behn Working with a Hammer, ca. 1928.

== Sources ==
- Biography @ the Galerie Bernd Dürr
