= Henri-Achille Zo =

French painter (1873–1933)

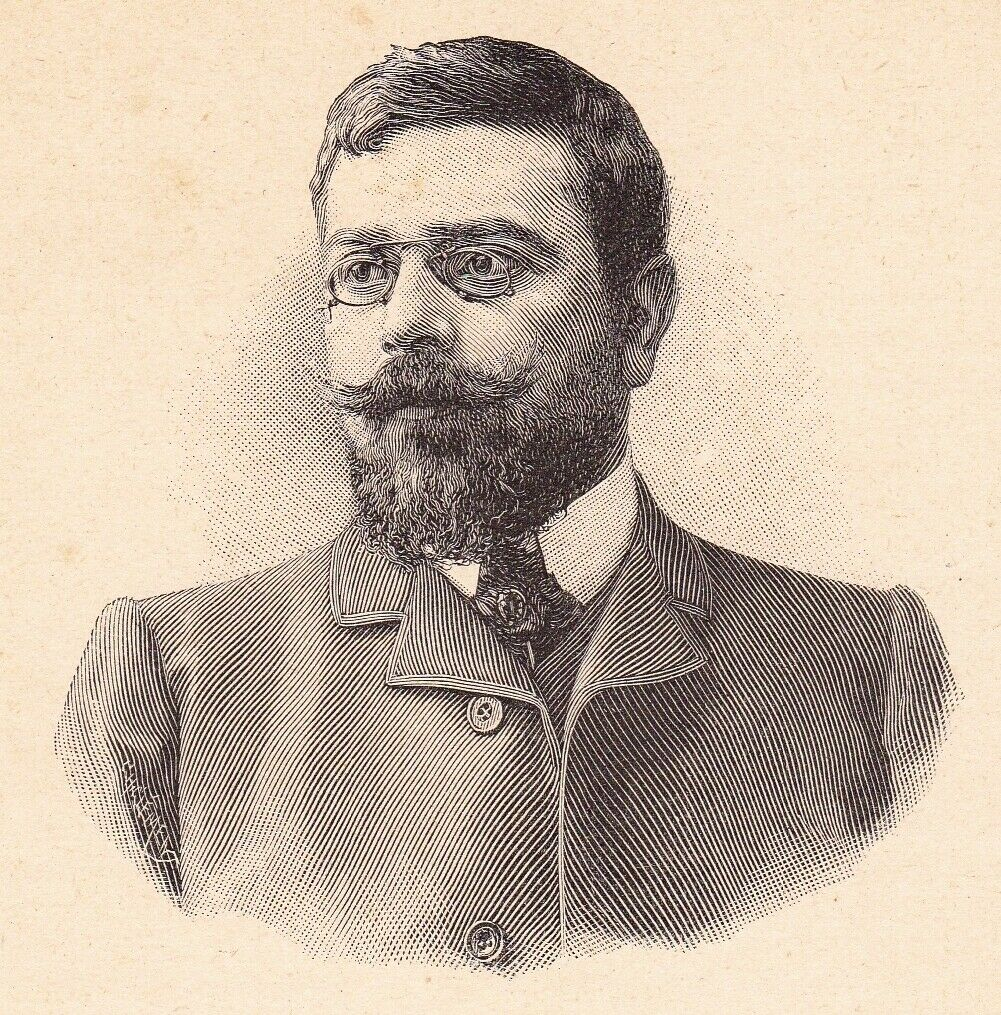
Henri-Achille Zo (1904)

Henri-Achille Zo (2 December 1873 – 9 September 1933) was a French painter and illustrator of Basque ancestry.

== Biography ==
Zo was born in Bayonne. He began as a pupil of his father, the painter Achille Zo, who was Director of the École des beaux-arts de Bordeaux. Later, he studied with Léon Bonnat and Albert Maignan at the École nationale supérieure des beaux-arts in Paris. He and his father were considered to be the founders of the style that came to be known as the "Bayonne School", which featured scenes from Spain and bullfighting tableaux.

He was awarded a silver medal at the Exposition Universelle (1900), which resulted in his receiving a government travel grant the following year. From 1897, he was a regular exhibitor at the Salon and won the National Prize in 1905. He also held regular showings with the "Société des Amis des Arts de Bordeaux".

In Paris, he created decorative works at the Théâtre National de l'Opéra-Comique and at the Chapelle Notre-Dame-de-Consolation de Paris, which was constructed as a memorial to the victims of the fire at the Bazar de la Charité. For many years, he was a professor at the Académie Julian.

In 1903, he received the Prix Rosa-Bonheur, for animal painting, then the Prix Trémont, awarded by the Académie des Beaux-Arts. In 1910, he was named a Knight in the Legion of Honor. His work was part of the art competitions at the 1928 Summer Olympics and the 1932 Summer Olympics.

As well as being a painter, he was known for illustrating numerous books, including Ramuntcho by Pierre Loti, the Nouvelles Impressions d'Afrique by Raymond Roussel, À la Mer by Paul Margueritte and La Cigarette by Jules Clarétie.

He was killed in an automobile accident near Onesse-Laharie.

His works may be seen at the Musée basque et de l'histoire de Bayonne, Musée Bonnat-Helleu, Musée de Cahors Henri-Martin and the Musée d'Orsay, among many others.

== Selected works ==
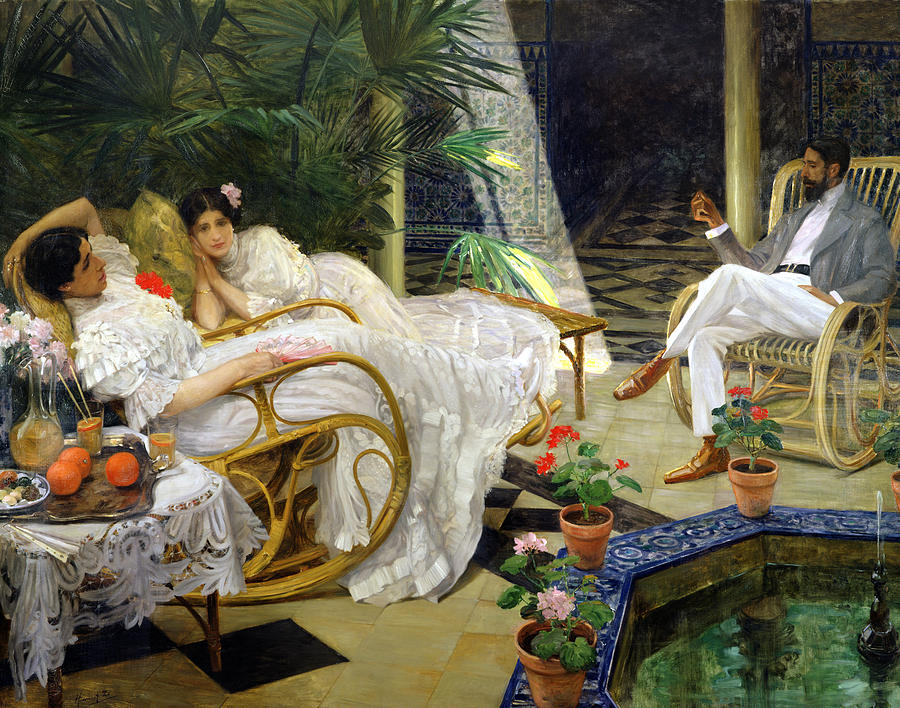
The Patio (Siesta)

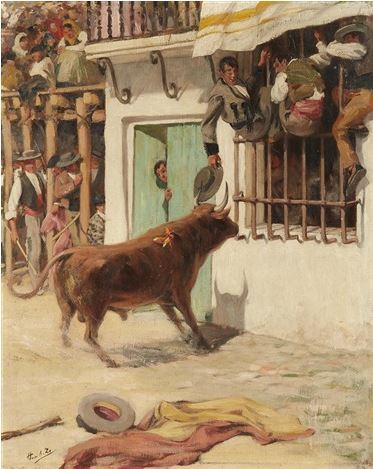
Bullfight Scene

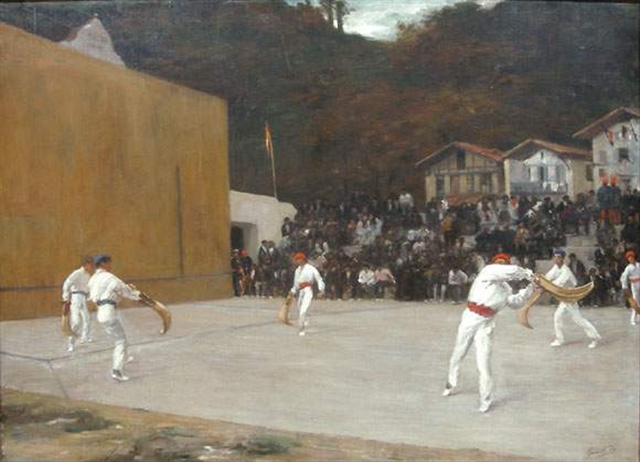
Basque Pelota

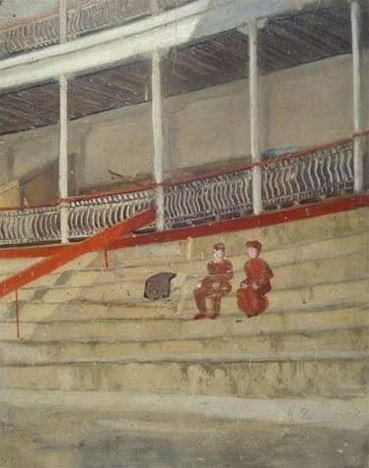
People in the Arena
