= Arthur Midy =

French painter

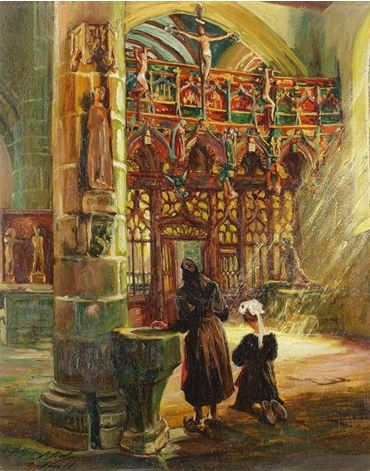
Interior of the Chapel at Saint-Fiacre

Arthur Midy (18 March 1877 – 18 March 1944) was a French landscape and genre painter.

== Biography ==
Midy was born in Saint-Quentin. His father, Alfred Hippolyte Midy, was a joiner. His mother's name was Adélaïde Marie Douay, and he had two brothers and three sisters. At a young age he joined the École Quentin de La Tour. In 1889 he was awarded a silver medal by Saint-Quentin in recognition of exceptional progress as a young student and, in 1890, he was awarded a bursary of 240 francs enabling him to attend the Henri Martin School. Further success saw him awarded a bursary of 800 francs by Saint-Quentin

In 1893, he enrolled at the Paris École des beaux-arts and then in 1900 at the Académie Julian. In 1906 he married Marie-Berthe Benoit in Paris. In 1905 he discovered Brittany and he made frequent visits to Faouët from 1907 to 1909 before deciding to take up residence there. He invited Gabriel Girodon, another Saint Quentin artist to join him. In 1907 he exhibited three paintings at an exhibition held at the "Palais de Fervaques" and he exhibited there again in 1911. In 1909 the French Government purchased his painting. "Le vieux buveur" from the Salon and, from 1912 onwards, he exhibited regularly there. That same year he had work hung at the Saint Quentin "Desprey-Pollet" gallery.

In 1921, he was employed in restoring and organizing the repatriation of works of art taken by the Germans. On 25 November 1938, after his divorce, he married a German woman named Emilie Maïer. This and his fraternization with the German occupying forces made him a target for the French Resistance, who assassinated him on 8 March 1944 in Le Faouët. In October, 1950, the contents of his studio were dispersed.

== Works ==
Some of Midy's paintings are:

- Le Vieux Buveur (Musée des Beaux-Arts de Quimper)
- La Fontaine Sainte-Barbe au Faouët (Musée du Faouët)
- Effet du soleil, un jour de foire
- Vieux Breton place des halles Le Faouët
- Réparation du toit de la chapelle Saint-Fiacre
- Femmes au marché du Faouët
- Blanche, chienne de Louis XV (held in France's embassy in Istanbul)
- Le Jour des pauvres

== Other selected paintings ==
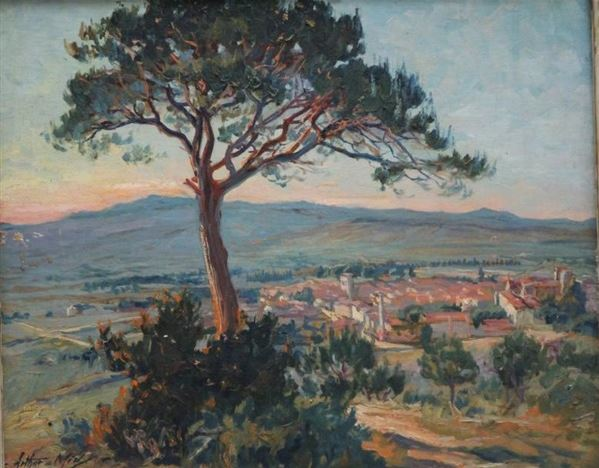
View of Aniane

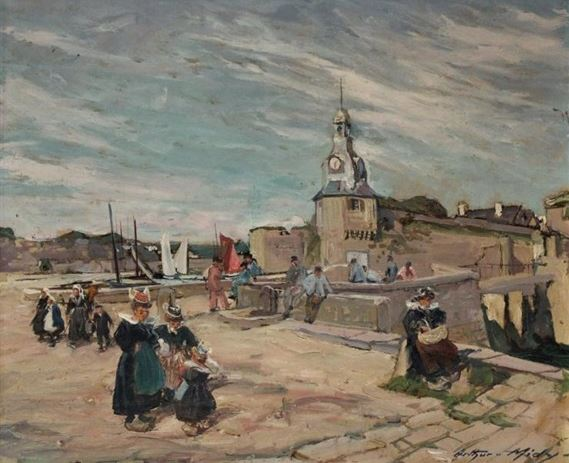
The Town Wall, Concarneau

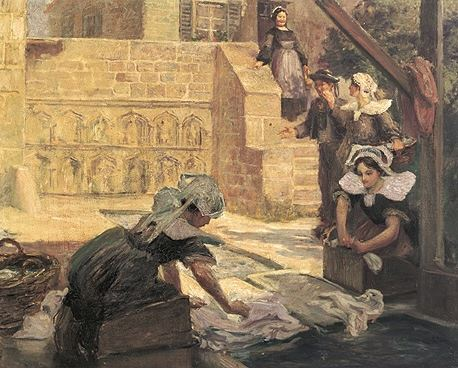
The Washerwomen of Le Faouët

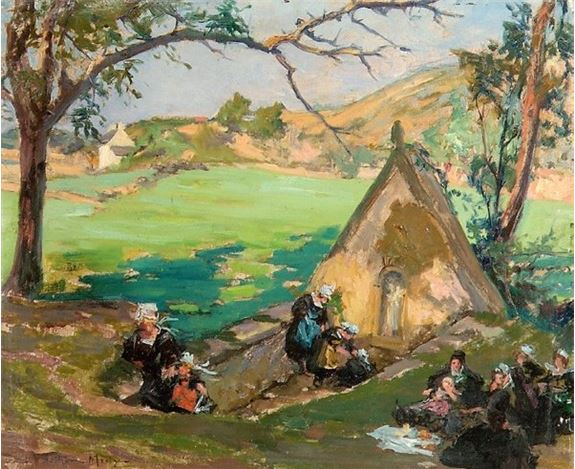
Breton Women at Pont-Aven
