= Karl Raupp =

German painter

- Born: March 2, 1837; Darmstadt, Germany
- Died: June 14, 1918 (aged 81); Munich, Germany
- Education: Akademie der Bildenden Künste München
- Known for: Painting
- Style: Landscape; Genre

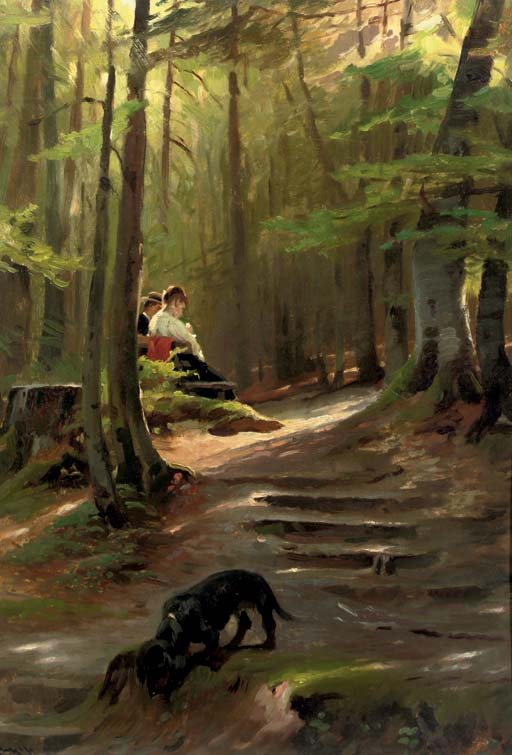
The curious dachshund, a sunny spot in the woods

Karl Raupp (2 March 1837 – 14 June 1918) was a German landscape and genre painter.

== Biography ==
He was born in Darmstadt. After studying genre painting under Jakob Becker at the Städel Institute in Frankfurt, he became a pupil and zealous follower of Piloty in Munich from 1860 to 1865, and he soon gathered a small school there. After 1865, he opened a studio, taking private pupils in painting. In 1868 his reputation as a teacher gained for him the position of professor in the art school at Nuremberg, where he stayed until 1879, when he returned to his former residence to become professor at the art academy in Munich. He died in 1918 in Munich.

== Works ==
His finely colored scenes from fishermen's and peasant life around Chiem Lake, which form his favorite subjects, show equal devotedness in the treatment of landscape and figures, and include:

- “In the Face of the Storm” (1885, Dresden Gallery)
- “Peace” (1889, National Gallery, Berlin)
- “Serious Meeting” (1889, Münster Gallery)
- “Chiem Lake” (1898, Reichstags-Gebäude, Berlin)
- “A Boating Party on Chiem Lake”
- “Home Before a Storm”
- “A Calm”
- “Ave Maria”
- “Sport and Work”
- “Starting Home from the Monastery School”

He published a Katechismus der Malerei (Painting catechism; 3d ed. 1898).
