= John Recknagel =

American painter

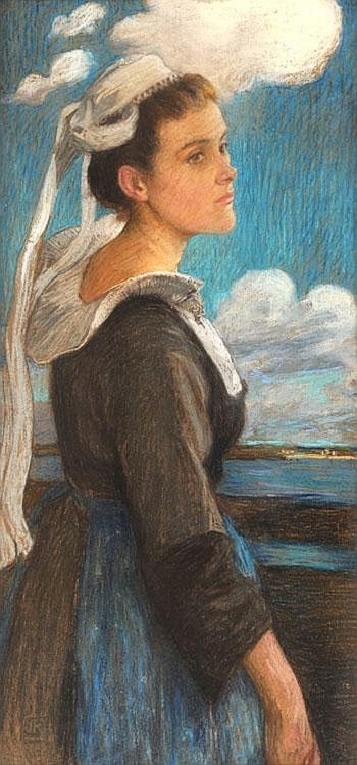
Young Woman from Fouesnant

John Herman Recknagel, also known as John H. Recknagel the Younger (12 October 1870, Brooklyn – 1940, Fouesnant) was an American painter, residing in France, who worked mostly in Brittany.

== Biography ==
His father was a wheat and spice merchant from Denmark, and his mother was German. He attended the National Academy of Design then, in 1891, went to France where he studied with Jean-Paul Laurens at the Académie Julian. His first exhibit at the Salon came in 1897.

In 1899 he and his wife, Sybil Withon, of Boston, moved to Concarneau, where he became a friend of his fellow expatriate artist, Charles Fromuth. Beginning in 1906, he and his family lived near Fouesnant in a house they built on the outskirts of town. After World War I, he made occasional visits back to the United States. He is interred at the community cemetery in Fouesnant.

Specializing in landscapes and portraits, he focused on Brittany and his native New York, but also painted scenes from the places he visited; such as Dresden and venice. He never exhibited widely or made any significant effort to sell his works; being able to depend on an inheritance.

The Musée des Beaux-Arts de Pont-Aven presented a major retrospective of his works in 1998.
