= Jean Bouchaud =

French painter

Jean Bouchaud (1891 in Saint Herblain near Nantes – 1977 in Nantes) was a French painter. He was fascinated by travel since his childhood seeing ships from Africa call at Nantes. Apart from his travels in Africa and elsewhere, he also received a bursary of the French colonial government in Indochina and traveled in Cambodia, Laos and Vietnam during 1924–25, winning the Prix d'Indochine. He was elected a member of the Institut de France, académie des Beaux-Arts, in 1951, in the seat of George Desvallières, he was succeeded by Jean Carzou in 1979.
