= Étienne Buffet =

French painter (1866–1948)

Marie Étienne Pierre Paul Aimé Buffet, known as Étienne Buffet (5 June 1866 – 3 December 1948), was a French painter.

== Biography ==
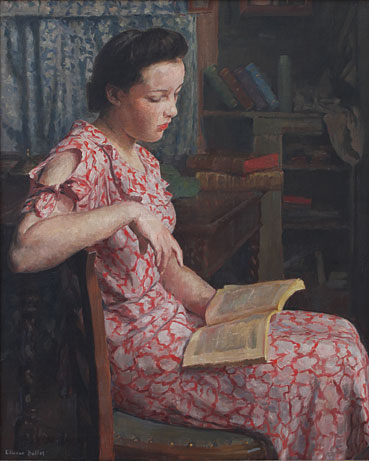
Lecture. Painting for which Buffet won an "honourable mention" at the 1938 Paris Salon

He was born in Paris, the son of Louis Aimé Buffet (1821–1900), who was Inspector General of Bridges and Highways and Marie Anne Philippine Fliche (1840–1921). He was a nephew of the statesman Louis Joseph Buffet. Before attending the Académie Julian he was a pupil of Franck Bail (1858–1924) and later of William Laparra (1873–1920), Paul Albert Laurens, Jean-Pierre Laurens (1875–1932) and Henri Royer. Étienne Buffet exhibited at the Salon des artistes français from 1903 until 1944. He was appointed "sociétaire" in 1910 and received an "honourable mention" in 1938 for the painting Lecture. He wrote "Essai de théorie intégrale de la peinture, la doctrine" which approached painting from a mathematician's viewpoint. He also served in the Artillery as a lieutenant-colonel.

Buffet died in Paris on 3 December 1948.

== Works exhibited ==
- 1903 - Salon des artistes français, Éplucheuse de légumes. Catalogue number 287.
- 1905 - Salon des artistes français, Intérieur. Catalogue number 297.
- 1906 - Salon des artistes français, Repasseuse.
- 1907 - Salon des artistes français, Riveur en bijouterie d'acier. Catalogue number 269.
- 1908 - Exposition d'Angers, Riveur en bijouterie d'acier
- 1909 - Salon des artistes français, Bretonne épluchant des pommes de terre. Catalogue number 291
- 1910 - Salon des artistes français, Bretonnes autour d'une lampe. Catalogue number 339.
- 1912 - Salon des artistes français, Bretonne lisant une lettre. Catalogue number 294
- 1914 - Salon des artistes français, Dentellière bretonne. Catalogue number 326
- 1920 - Salon des artistes français, Bretonne d'Auray. Catalogue number 284
- 1922 - Salon des artistes français, Avant la pêche. Catalogue number 291
- 1923 - Salon des artistes français, Le Manuscrit arabe. Catalogue number 306 and Nonchalance catalogue 307
- 1924 - Salon des artistes français, Bretonne. Catalogue number 334
- 1925 - Salon des artistes français, Au Luxembourg. Catalogue number 174 and "'Sur le mur du Port-Louis" catalogue number 115
- 1926 - Salon des artistes français, La lucarne d'où on voit la mer. Catalogue number 329
- 1927 - Salon des artistes français, Pêcheuse du Port-Louis Catalogue number 323 and Après la lecture catalogue number 322
- 1928 - Salon des artistes français, La Robe à fleurs. Catalogue number 338
- 1928 - 3ème Salon Nautique International au Grand Palais, Pêcheuse du Port-Louis and La côte près de Carqueiranne
- 1929 - Salon des artistes français, Étude. Catalogue 399 and Portrait de Melle B. Catalogue number 389
- 1929 - 4ème Salon Nautique International au Grand Palais, Rade de Toulon, Port de Toulon and La mer au Port-Louis
- 1930 - Salon des artistes français, La Harpe arabe. Catalogue number 349 and Jeune fille catalogue number 350
- 1931 - Salon des artistes français, La Robe verte . Catalogue number 370 and La robe jaune catalogue number 371
- 1932 - Salon des artistes français, Tricoteuse. Catalogue number 388
- 1934 - Salon des artistes français, Rêverie. Catalogue number 384 and Le tricot vert catalogue 385
- 1935 - Salon des artistes français, Les Soucis. Catalogue number 347 and Incertitude caltaloue number 348
- 1936 - Salon des artistes français, Les Bibelots. Catalogue number 431
- 1937 - Salon des artistes français, Rêverie . Catalogue number 217.
- 1938 - Salon des artistes français, Lecture. Catalogue number 274.
- 1939 - Salon des artistes français, L'Album. Catalogue number 453
- 1942 - Salon des artistes français, Portrait (mon portrait symétrique). Catalogue number 177.
- 1944 - Salon des artistes français, Les arènes à Paris. Catalogue number 838 and Le port Henri-IV catalogue 839.

== Gallery ==
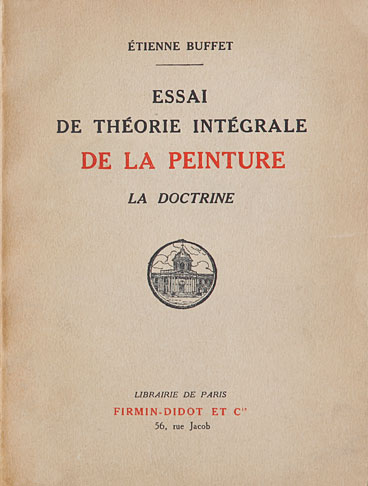
"Essai de théorie intégrale de la peinture, la doctrine" The cover of Buffet's book published in 1932 by Firmin-Didot & Cie

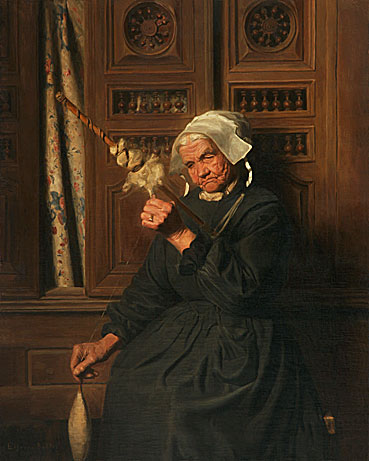
Vieille bretonne filant la quenouille. 1908.

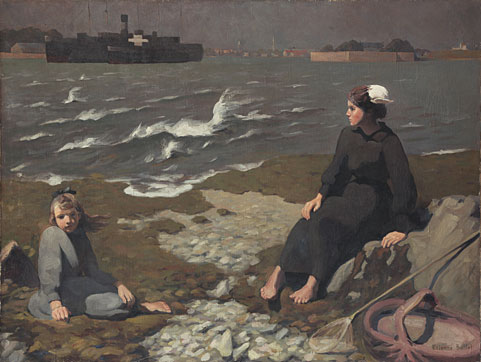
Avant la pêche 1921

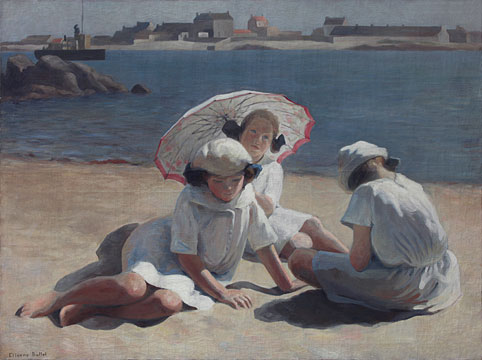
Les trois petites sur la plage du Lohic.1922

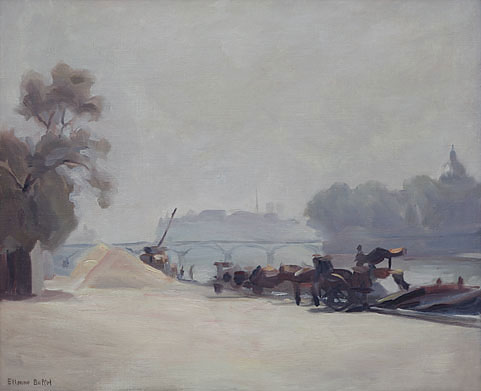
Vue du pont des Arts 1923

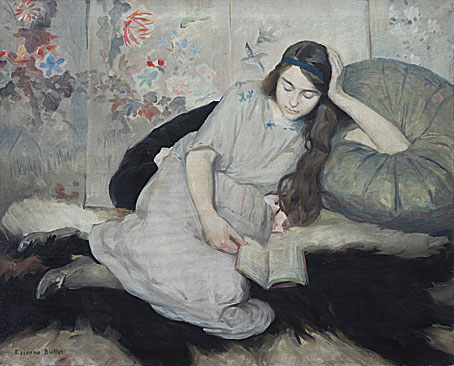
Nonchalance. 1923

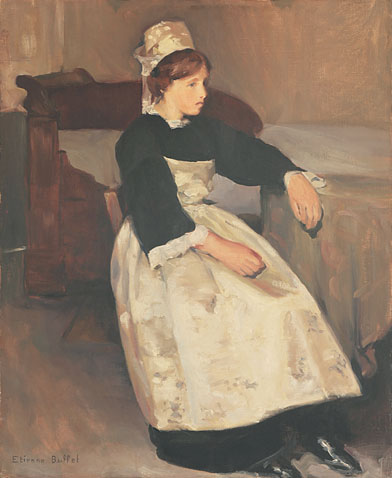
Bretonne (in the costume of Faouët). 1923

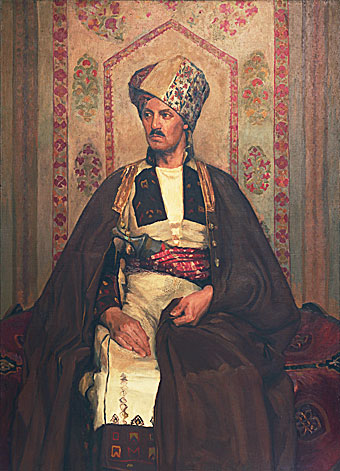
Henri Fliche in the costume of Mascate. 1927

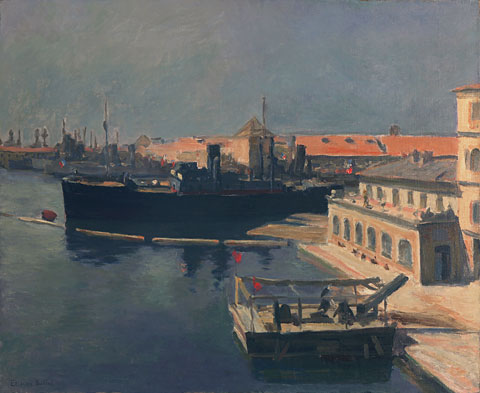
The Port of Toulon. 1929

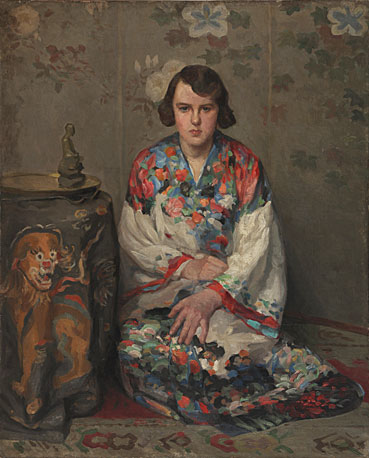
Le kimono. 1931

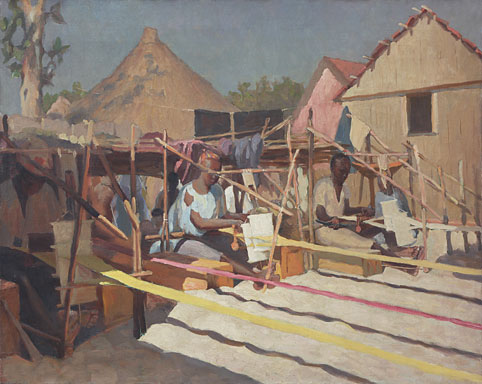
Tisserands de Dakar. 1934

== Honours and distinctions ==
- 1908 - Chevalier de la Légion d'honneur
- 1910 - Made "Sociétaire" of the Société des artistes français
- 1918 - Officier de la Légion d'honneur
- 1938 - "Honourable Mention" at Salon des artistes français.

== Bibliography ==
- Dictionnaire biographique des artistes contemporains, 1910-1930, tome I, par Edouard-Joseph. Éditeur : Art et Édition, 1931.
- Bénézit, Dictionnaire des peintres, sculpteurs, dessinateurs et graveurs. Éditeur : Gründ, 1999.
- Catalogues des Salons de la Société des artistes français.
- En relisant leurs lettres - souvenirs d'enfance (1909-1919), d'Henri-François Buffet. Éditions Bahon-Rault, Rennes, 1964
