= María Ariza y Delance =

Cuban painter (1873–1959)

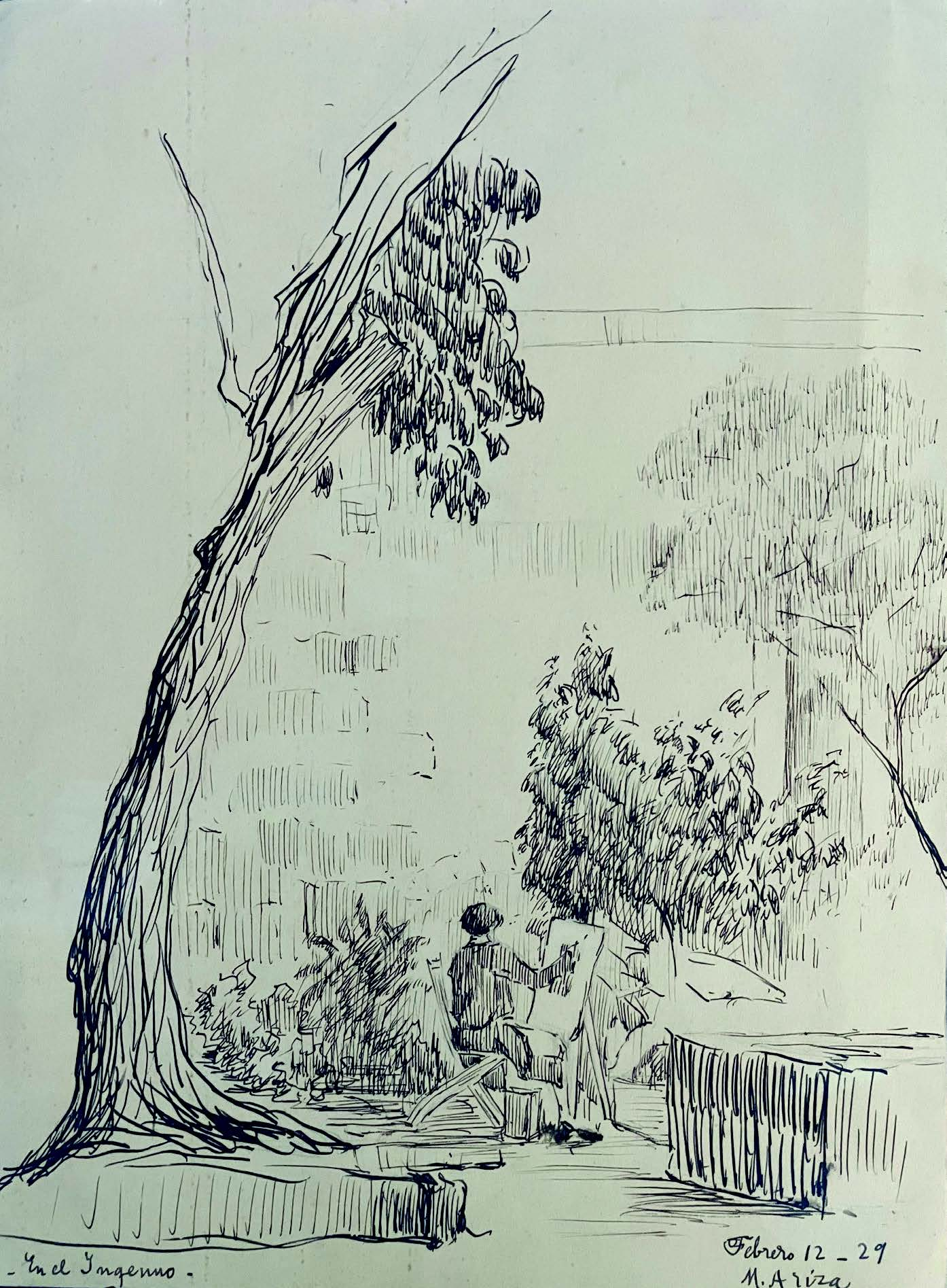
- En el ingenio (At the Sugarmill), 1929
- Born: 1873; Havana (Cuba)
- Died: September 7, 1959 (aged 85–86); Havana
- Alma mater: Academia Nacional de Bellas Artes San Alejandro; Académie Julian
- Occupation: Painter, artist
- Employer: Academia Nacional de Bellas Artes San Alejandro (1926–)

María Ariza y Delance (1873 – September 7, 1959) was a Cuban landscape painter. She was a professor at the Academia Nacional de Bellas Artes San Alejandro from 1926 to 1959.

María Ariza y Delance was the daughter of Antonio Ariza Pereira, an architect, and Elisa Delance y Nebot. She is typically identified as Afro-Cuban by historians, though it is unclear whether or not she was identified this way by herself and her contemporaries, as several government forms identify her as blanca (white). Ariza became a student at the Academy of San Alejandro, where she studied under Valentín Sanz Carta and Leopoldo Romañach Guillén. Sanz Carta was a particular influence, with his practice of having students paint en plein air and taking them on field trips to do so. Ariza travelled to Europe in 1907 to further her studies. She entered the Académie Julian in Paris and studied under Marcel Baschet , William Laparra, and Jean-Paul Laurens, and later studied under Cecilio Pla Gallardo in Madrid. In 1916, her painting Consejos Inútiles won a contest sponsored by La Academia Nacional de Artes y Letras de Cuba, providing her with financial support that allowed her to remain in Europe longer. Sometime in the 1920s, she returned to Cuba, where she spent the rest of her life teaching at the Academia San Alejandro.

María Ariza y Delance died on 7 September 1959 in Havana.
