= Eisenschitz =

Eisenschitz is a surname. Notable people with the surname include:

- Bernard Eisenschitz (born 1944), French film critic, subtitler, and historian
- Willy Eisenschitz (1889–1974), French painter of Austrian origin
