= Francis Lapp =

French–Polish electrical engineer and entrepreneur

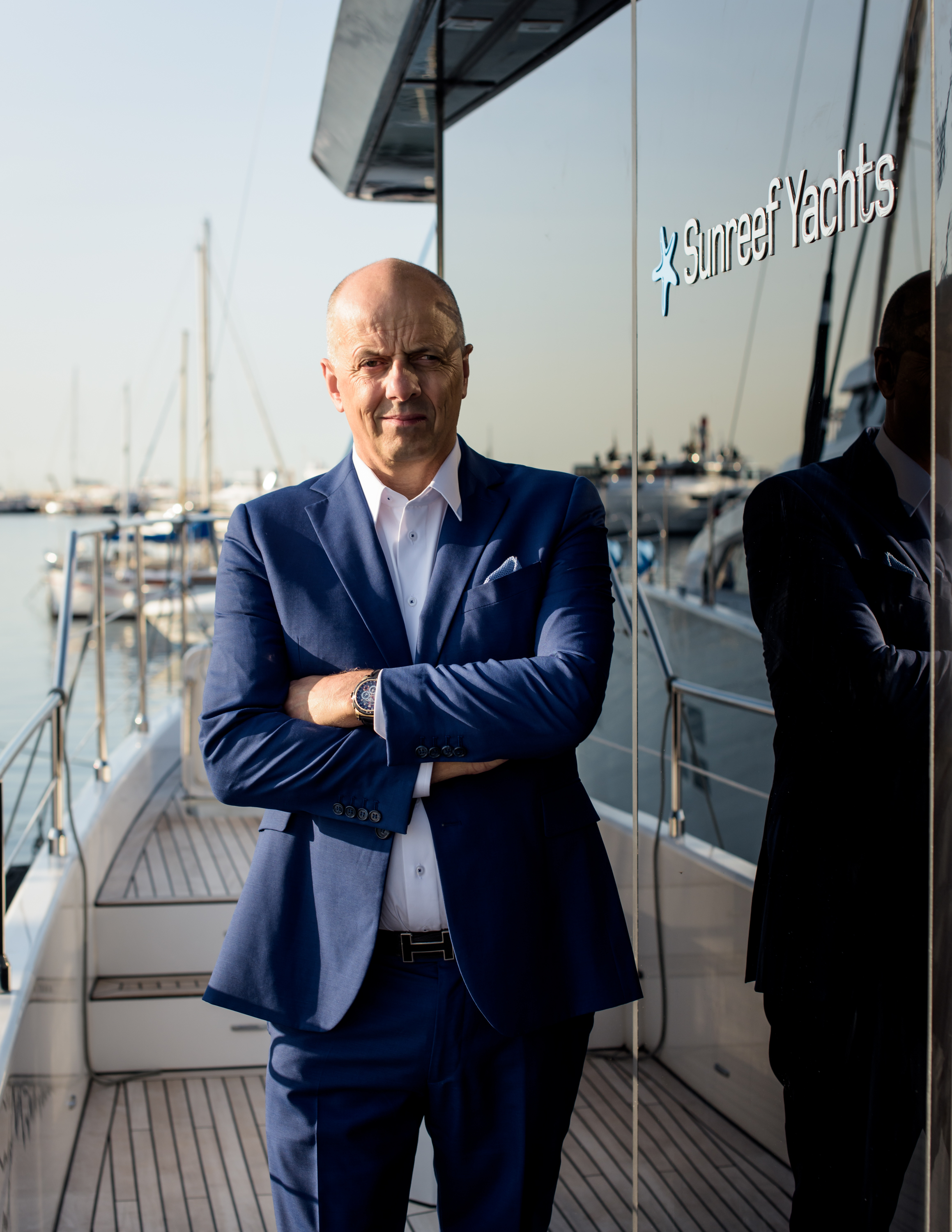
- Born: 1958 (age 67–68)
- Citizenship: French and Polish
- Occupations: Entrepreneur; engineer; owner and CEO of Sunreef Yachts and Sunreef Yachts Charter; owner of HTEP Polska; racing car driver; sailor

Francis Joseph Lapp (born 1958) is a French electrical engineer and entrepreneur active in France, Luxembourg and Poland. Originally French, he obtained Polish citizenship in 2014. He is the owner and chief executive officer of Sunreef Yachts, a luxury catamaran shipyard located in the former Gdańsk Shipyard in Gdańsk, Poland. Throughout his career he has also led or owned numerous other companies.

== Biography ==
Lapp was born in a small town near Mulhouse in the French region of Alsace. Initially working for France-based multinational corporations, he spent a couple of years in Saudi Arabia working on construction of hospitals. In the late 1980s, Lapp quit his job and started a small company producing switchgear cubicles for Siemens and Coca-Cola, among other clients. A race car driver in his free time, in 1991 Lapp visited Poland for the first time to take part in one of Polish Automobile and Motorcycle Association's "Off-Road Championship of Poland" rally raids.

Soon afterwards, he returned to Poland, this time looking for business opportunities. At the time France was slowly recovering from decades of stagnation, while the Polish economy was undergoing a shock therapy scheme dubbed the Balcerowicz Plan, which would soon lead to GDP growth rates exceeding 6%. This, coupled with lower wages and a skilled workforce, made Poland of the 1990s attract much foreign investment. In 1992, Lapp settled in Poland for good. There he launched HTEP Polska, initially as a switchgear producer. With time the company started designing and installing electrical, air-conditioning and sanitary systems for industrial facilities, but also Castorama DIY shops, Carrefour hypermarkets, Grand Hotel in Sopot, BSH Hausgeräte facilities in Łódź, and Emporio Armani boutique in Warsaw, among others.

In the 1990s, Lapp became an active sailor and took part in the 1996 Polish Hobie Cat Championships, finishing sixth in the Hobie 16 class. In 1998 or 2000 he visited the Salon nautique international de Paris in order to buy a similar racing catamaran for himself, but instead bought three cruising catamarans, transported them to Madagascar and founded Sunreef Charter, a France-based yacht charter company His son Nicolas also owned a travel agency specialising in luxurious yachts.

In 2000, Lapp and Nicolas decided to start building yachts themselves, instead of buying them from other shipyards. Lapp leased 6000 square metres of the recently closed Gdańsk Shipyard and started Sunreef Yachts, the first shipyard in Poland specialising in catamaran construction. The first vessel, a 22.5-metre catamaran designed by Van Peteghem Lauriot-Prévost, was launched on 25 July 2003, its godmother was Anna Maria Jopek, a popular Polish singer. It took roughly two years to find a buyer for the first vessel, but eventually the business took off. The second vessel, a 70-footer in the Power 70 class, was bought by a renowned Swiss sailor Laurent Bourgnon. In 2005, the company had 130 employees, by 2013 the number rose to 450. Apart from selling yachts, the company also offers yacht chartering services.

Despite the 2008 financial crisis that forced many other luxury yachts producers into bankruptcy, Lapp's company continued to grow. However, in January 2011 Sunreef's premises, along with three catamarans under construction, were destroyed by a fire most likely caused by a chemical reaction in a tank containing a mixture of industrial hardener with resin. Lapp decided to rebuild the shipyard in Gdańsk, despite incentives to move the company elsewhere.

As of 2024, the shipyard has sold 570 boats. Sunreef catamarans are in operation worldwide.

Lapp's company is a known in the design and construction of large, customized luxury catamarans, exhibiting at yacht shows including Cannes, Monaco, Miami, Fort Lauderdale, Dubai, Qatar and Singapore.

Lapp is also co-founder of the design of a new range of sail and power catamarans inspired with both classical and c marine architecture.

In 2013, 2014, 2016 and 2018 Lapp organized the "Pomorskie Rendez–Vous" an event fostered by Mieczysław Struk – Marshal of the Pomeranian Voivodeship, and Pawel Adamowicz – Mayor of Gdansk. The event was created in order to promote luxury brands in Poland.

In 2020, Lapp chose the United Arab Emirates as the headquarters for global expansion plans of Sunreef, geared towards Asian and MENA markets. In 2022, he entered into a cooperation with the Emirate of Ras Al Khaimah for the development of the new facility on the grounds of RAK Maritime City Free Zone Authority. Developed on a 65,000m2 land reserve, the new shipyard incorporates the latest technologies in the luxury yacht building and aims for the highest standards in the industry. The official opening of the facility took place in February 2024.

With two manufacturing sites (Poland & the United Arab Emirates) Lapp’s strategy is for the shipyards to complement each other as production grows.

In March 2023 Lapp officially inaugurated the company’s new office in the Emirate of Dubai, located on the Palm Jumeirah. By choosing Dubai, Lapp planned to build the international presence of his company and create a sophisticated ‘yachting think tank’ with a mission to form the new trends in the concept of responsible and sustainable yachting.

== Awards ==
- Entrepreneur of the Year – World Yacht Trophies 2013
- Best Exporter in the Awards "Ambasador Polskiej Gospodarki" – Business Centre Club
- The Silver Cross of Merit
- Presidential Economic Awards – International Success 2020
- The YCM EXPLORER AWARD winning in the Technology & Innovation category 2023
- Ambassador’s Award The Best Polish Companies in Monaco 2023
