= Pierre Deval =

Pierre Deval may refer to:

- Pierre Deval (painter)
- Pierre Deval (diplomat)
