= Hôtel de Ville, La Valette-du-Var =

Town hall in La Valette-du-Var, France

Hôtel de Ville
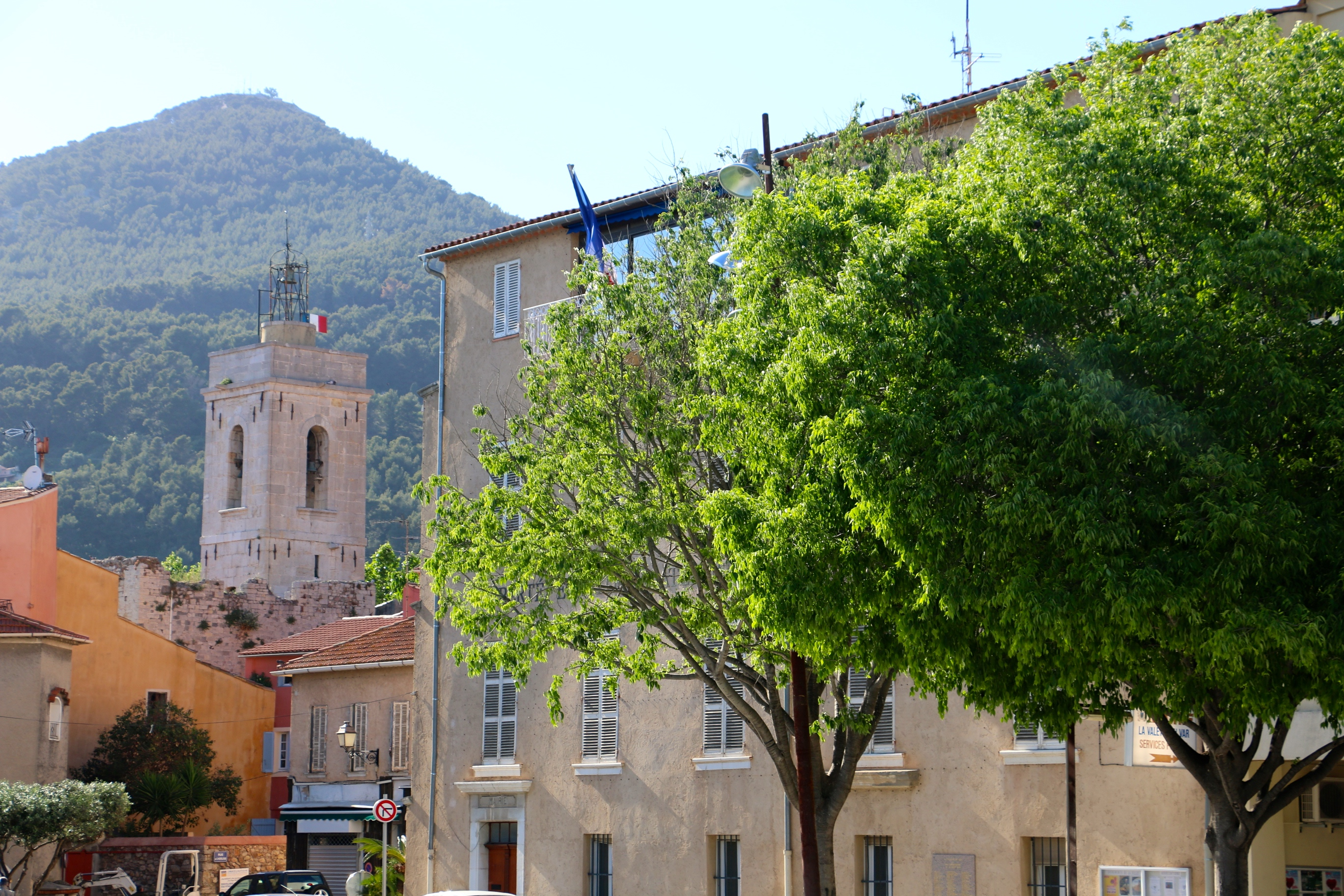
- The main frontage of the Hôtel de Ville (on the right) in May 2015
- Interactive map of the Hôtel de Ville area

General information
- Type: City hall
- Architectural style: Neoclassical style
- Location: La Valette-du-Var, France
- Coordinates: 43.1377°N 5.9840°E
- Completed: 1993

The Hôtel de Ville (French pronunciation: [otɛl də vil], City Hall) is a municipal building in La Valette-du-Var, Var, in southeastern France, standing on Place Général de Gaulle.

== History ==
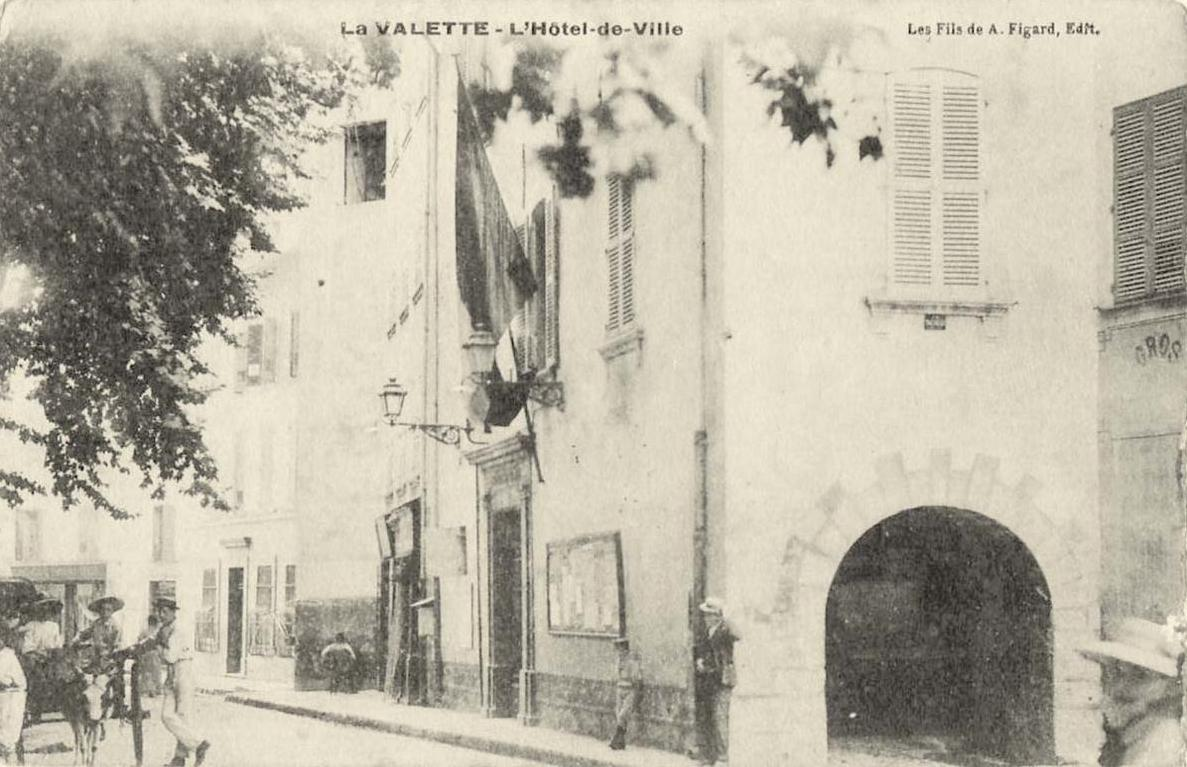
The old town hall on Avenue Char Verdun

The consuls established their first municipal building in a house on the south side of the Route Nationale (now Avenue Char Verdun) in the late 17th century. The house was commissioned as a private residence and had probably been completed earlier that century. The three-storey building was built in rubble masonry with a cement render finish and featured a distinctive doorway flanked by pilasters supporting an entablature and a cornice. In the second half of the century, it was owned by Balthasar de Saqui, Seigneur Fos, who was an adviser to Louis XIV as well as a lieutenant-general in the court of Toulon.

De Saqui sold the building to the consuls in 1681. It was used as a school and then as a prison and, after the French Revolution, it served for another two centuries as a town hall. After it was no longer required for municipal use, it remained in public ownership and, following completion of an extensive programme of refurbishment works which cost €898,000, it was reopened by the mayor, Thierry Albertini, as a community centre in September 2024.

In the early 1990s, following significant population growth, the town council led by the mayor, Jacques Roux, decided to establish a more substantial town hall. The site they selected on the north side of Place Général de Gaulle had originally been part of a large property, the Enclos Estate, which incorporated a manor house, the Château du Clos. The main structure of the new town hall complex was a rectangular four-storey building facing onto Place Général de Gaulle. It had been designed in the neoclassical style and built in stone with a cement render finish. The design involved an asymmetrical main frontage of five bays facing onto the square. There was a doorway with a stone surround and a cornice in the left-hand bay, and a balcony with an iron railing across two bays on the third floor. The property was acquired by the council in 1993.

The council also acquired a building behind the main structure on the corner of Léon Guerin and Avenue Char Verdun. That property had been used as a butcher's shop in the early 20th century but the council converted it for use as the public entrance to the complex. The design of the new public entrance involved a canted frontage on the corner of the two streets with a wide segmental-headed arch on the ground floor; there were two casement windows on the first floor and the same on the second floor. A plaque was installed on the frontage facing Place Général de Gaulle to commemorate the names of the soldiers of the 5th Regiment of the Chasseurs d'Afrique, who had liberated the town on 23 August 1944, during the Second World War.
