= Pierre Deval (painter) =

French painter (1897–1993)

Pierre Deval (1897 in Lyon – 1993 in La Valette-du-Var), was a French figurative painter of the 20th century, noted as a colorist and for his subtle paintings of women and children. In the 1920s and 1930s, the Domaine d'Orvès, his house at La Valette-du-Var, was a gathering place for French artists who worked along the Côte d'Azur and in Provence.

== Youth and Education ==
Pierre Jean Charles Deval was born August 20, 1897, in Lyon, the third child of a silk merchant, Gustave Deval (1853–1943). Pierre was of fragile health, and his parents took him frequently to the countryside or beach resorts for rest and a change of air, or to Paris to visit the galleries of the Luxembourg Palace and the Louvre. He also frequented the musee Saint Pierre in Lyon, where he was deeply impressed by the drawings and sculpture of Auguste Rodin, and visited the Institute of Archeology, where he saw the reproductions of Greco-Latin statues and developed a passion for Greek and Roman myths, which was to play a large part in his later work.

In 1914, at the beach at La Baule, he became friends with Rene Chomette, who became famous much later as a film director under the pseudonym of René Clair. The two boys began a long friendship and corresponded frequently about their discoveries in art. At the age of 14, Deval was particularly impressed by the exoticism of the colors, sets and costumes of the Ballets Russes, which visited Lyon.

== Career as an artist ==
He began to study art seriously in Paris as student of painter Émile-René Ménard and Lucien Simon. Deval had his first show of drawings, portraits of young women, at the Lyon salon of 1918. In 1921, he became a friend of the French surrealist poet Jacques Rigaut, who introduced him into the circle of the Dadaism, and of Tristan Tzara, and writers André Breton and Louis Aragon. He briefly edited an artistic review in Lyon between February 1921 and June 1922. At the 1921 Salon d’Automne in Paris he had his first success with the painting Ariane (which won the Jean-Julien Lemordant Prize), a realistic painting of the back of a woman lying on her side, looking at a cityscape, which was purchased by the French Government for the Musee Luxembourg, and hung in the Jeu de Pomme. Other painters in the salon that year included Henri Matisse, Claude Monet, Pierre Bonnard, Paul Gauguin, Roussel and Cross.

In the autumn of 1922, the success of his painting Ariane earned him a two-year fellowship at the Villa Abd-el-Tif in Algiers, a residence for painters. He was 25. He had become disenchanted with the Dada group and began looking for a new style of his own. In Algeria he encountered fauvist Albert Marquet, twenty-two years older, and became a friend of that painter. He also met his future wife, Henriette Bergerat, in February 1923, and they lived together in the villa. His paintings ranged from landscapes of Algiers and scenes of Algerian women preparing to bathe and dressing, to ventures in modernism.

In 1924 he was selected to participate in the Venice Biennale, with a group of French artists that included Albert Marquet, Pierre Bonnard, and Maurice Denis. His works of this period featured exotic scenes from Algeria, and odalisques, as well as cityscapes of Algiers. His modernist paintings and drawings of blacks and whites together were condemned by traditional critics as too radical, while his other paintings were condemned by modernist critics as too traditional.

When his fellowship ended he returned to Paris and moved into the studio at 19 quai St. Michel which Matisse had just vacated. He experimented with different styles, and in 1926 he painted five watercolors of modern Parisian life for a book L'ecole des indifferents by Jean Giraudoux. He worked as an illustrator for several journals, and showed his work in Paris galleries.

== Deval in Provence ==
In 1925 he decided to move to the South of France, and purchased a 17th-century bastide at Valette-du-Gard, near Hyeres. He installed his studio on the first floor and painted murals of mythological scenes on the walls of the dining room and entry hall. He welcomed to his house other artists who had moved to Provence, including writer and poet Henri Bosco, and the painters Raoul Dufy, Marquet, Jean Puy and Willy Eisenschitz. In the years that followed he painted realistic scenes of Marseille and Toulon, and sensitive paintings of women, children and families. He took part in a show in Marseille in 1933 on Provence seen by painters.

During World War II, he saw his home occupied by a German artillery unit, who cut down most of the trees to have a clear view for their guns. He was finally able to return to his house in 1944. After the war he ran into trouble with the French Communist Party, who dominated the Paris art world, when he did not sign a petition opposing the re-armament of Germany, saying that he was an artist and he preferred to sign only paintings. Thereafter he showed his work mostly at galleries in Provence.

He died at his house in La Valette-du-Var in 1993, little known by the public, but respected by his fellow artists in Provence.

== Paintings by Deval in Museum Collections ==
- Musée National des Beaux Arts in Algiers
- Musée Ahmed Zabana in Oran
- National Museum in Tokyo
- British Museum in London
- Musée d'art de Toulon
- Musée des Beaux-Arts de Lyon

== Bibliography ==
- Dominique Buis (sous la direction de Dominique Buis, Marie-Jo Volle, Nathalie Garel), Pierre Deval : in Peindre l'Ardèche, Peindre en Ardèche - de la préhistoire au XXe siècle, Privas, Mémoire d'Ardèche et Temps Présent, 2022, chap. 2 (« Peintres du Vivarais, Peintres d'Ardèche ») ISBN 9782919146680
- Élizabeth Cazenave, La Villa Abd-el-Tif, un demi-siècle de vie artistique en Algérie, 1907-1962, Éditions Abd-el-Tif, 1998. ISBN 9782950986115
- René Édouard-Joseph, Dictionnaire biographique des artistes contemporains, volume 1, A-E, Art & Édition, 1930, p. 405.
- Michèle Gorenc, Pierre Deval, le Maître d'Orvès, 1997, Marseille, Éditions Autres temps, 1997. ISBN 9782911873294
