= Claire Bertrand (painter) =

French expressionist artist

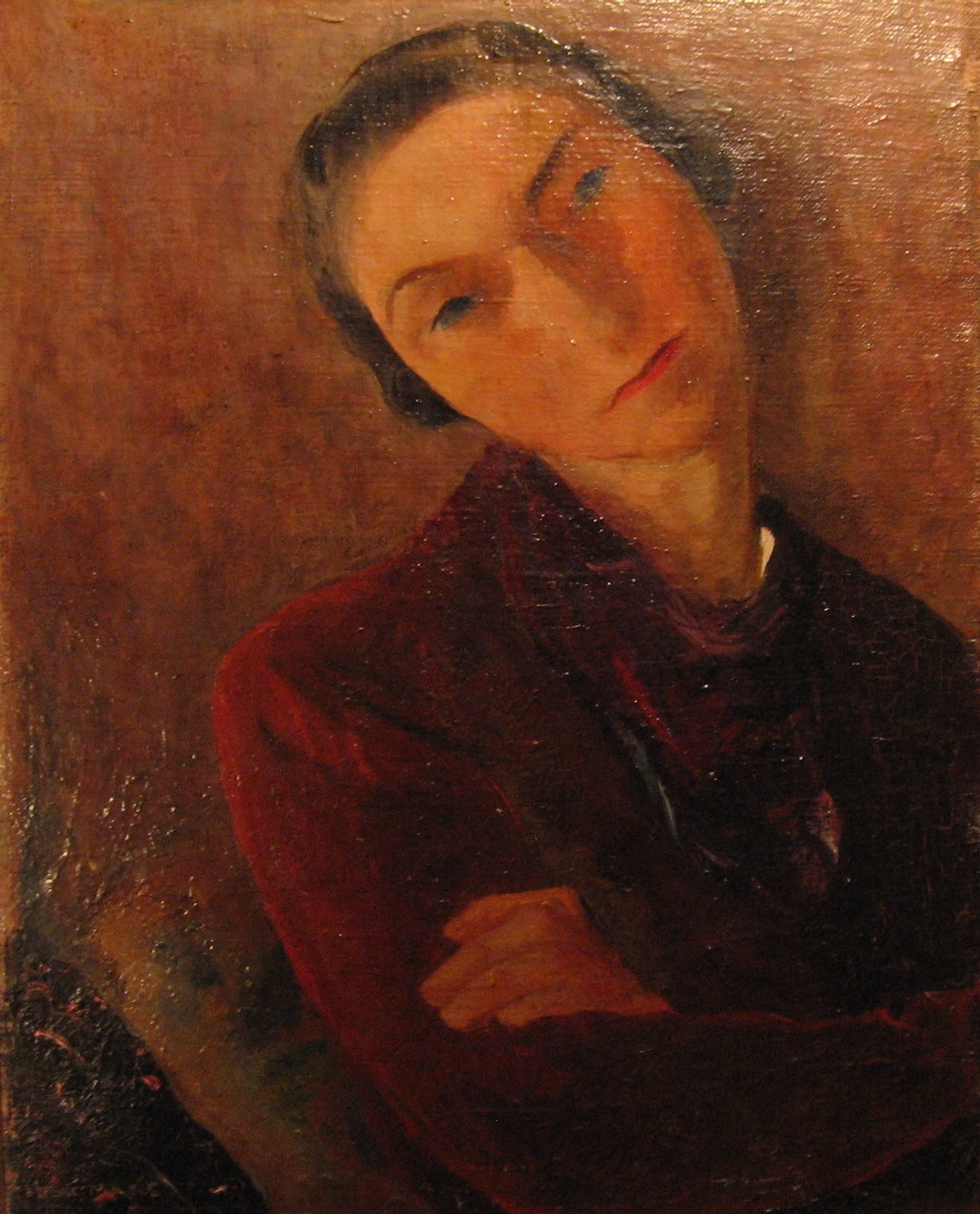
Claire Bertrand, painting by her daughter Evelyn Marc

Claire Bertrand-Eisenschitz, also known as Claire Bertrand, was a French expressionist artist born in Sèvres (now in the Hauts-de-Seine) on 22 June 1890. She died on 8 December 1969. She was the wife of the painter Willy Eisenschitz, also a French painter and draftsman.

As a painter of the expressionist school, Claire Bertrand focused mainly landscapes and portraits, which reduces the grounds to basics. She mainly exhibited her works in Paris and in the south of france.

== Biography ==
Born in 1890 in Sèvres (Seine-et-Oise, now in the Hauts-de-Seine), Claire Bertrand is the daughter of Marcel Bertrand geologist and Mathilde Mascart, a talented pianist; she is the granddaughter of the mathematician Joseph Bertrand.

Claire Bertrand in Paris entered the Académie Julian and the Great chaumière where she attended the studio of René Ménard and Lucien simon. Her she met fellow student, painter Willy Eisenschitz; they married in 1913.

Arrested in 1914 as an Austrian subject, her husband was detained in an internment camp during the beginning of the First World War. Claire Bertrand sharing his captivity. Evelyne his daughter and his son David were born in the camp.

After the war, Claire Bertrand did exhibitions in 1921 and 1922 in the Salon of the National Society of Fine Arts. She also exhibited at the Salon of independent artists from 1922 to 1930, and the Salon d'Automne in 1922 to 1938.

== Exhibitions ==
- Société nationale des Beaux-arts, 1921 et 1922.
- Salon des artistes indépendants, de 1922 à 1930.
- Salon d'automne, de 1922 à 1938.
- Billiet, plusieurs expositions entre 1927 et 1937.
- Salon des Tuileries, de 1928 à 1943.
- Les vingt-deux, groupe féminin (Edith Auerbach, Claire Bertrand, Chériane, Rolande Dechorain, Adrienne Jouclard...) - Peintures, sculptures, photographies, Galerie Bonaparte, Paris, 1937.
- Diverses expositions locales en Provence.
- Une famille de peintres, galerie Allard, 1949 : Claire Bertrand, Willy Eisenschitz, et leur fille Evelyn Marc.
- Claire Bertrand, exposition rétrospective, galerie Bruno-Bassano, 1974.
