= Hôtel de Ville, Liévin =

Town hall in Liévin, France

Hôtel de Ville
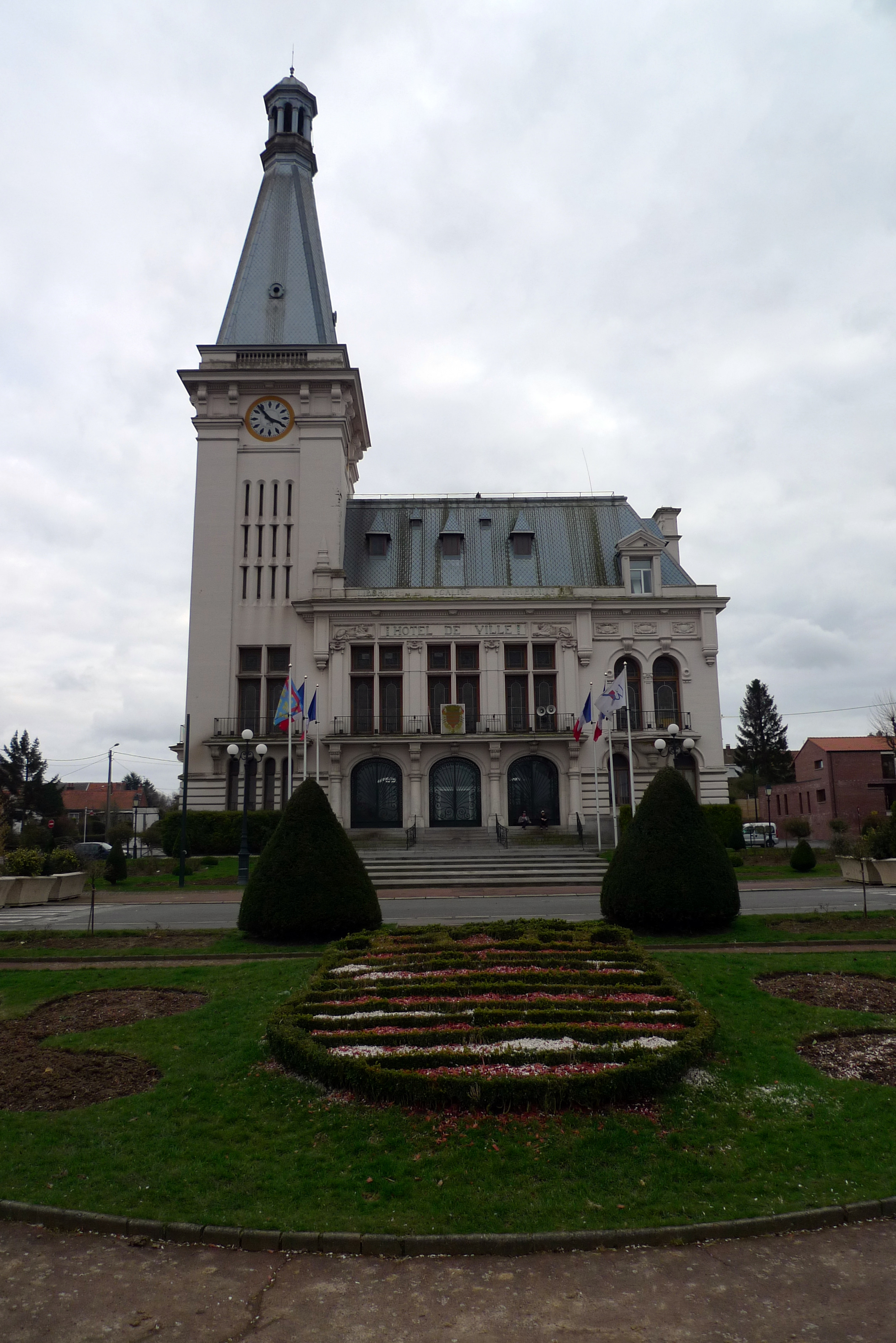
- The main frontage of the Hôtel de Ville in March 2009
- Interactive map of the Hôtel de Ville area

General information
- Type: City hall
- Architectural style: Neoclassical style
- Location: Liévin, France
- Coordinates: 50.4171°N 2.7752°E
- Completed: 1926

Height
- Height: 30 metres (98 ft)

Design and construction
- Architect: Jean Goniaux

The Hôtel de Ville (French pronunciation: [otɛl də vil], City Hall) is a municipal building in Liévin, Pas-de-Calais in the northern France, standing on Avenue Arthur Lamendin.

== History ==
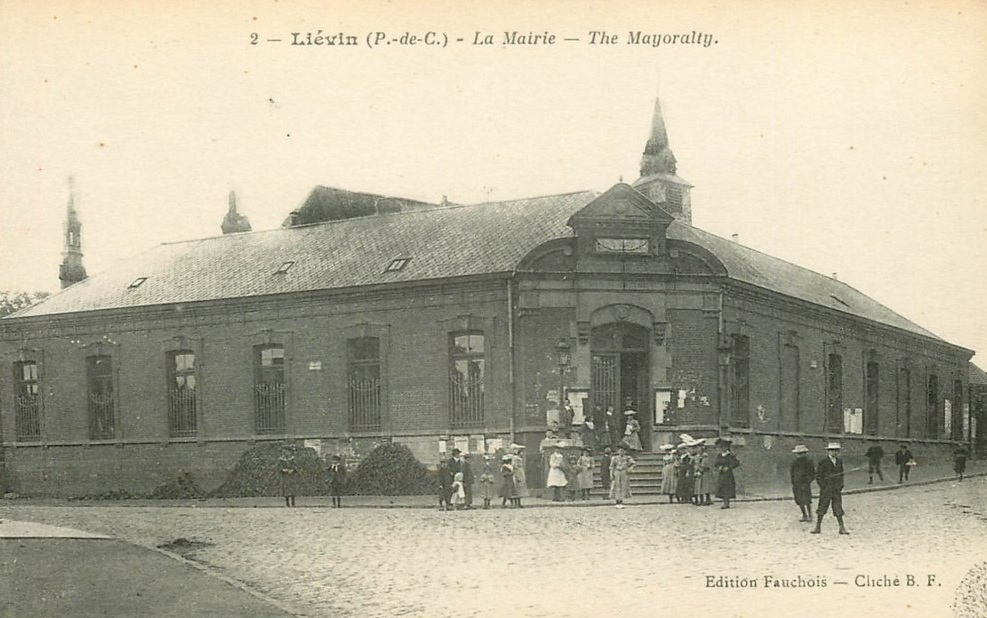
The old town hall

Following the French Revolution, the town council initially met in the house of the mayor at the time. This changed in the mid-19th century, when they established a small municipal office in a building in an old cemetery adjacent to the Church of Saint Martin. After significant population growth, largely associated with the mining industry, the council decided to commission a larger building. The site they selected was on the corner of Rue d'Avion and Rue de l'Église. This single-storey building was designed in the neoclassical style, built in ashlar stone and was completed in 1887. The design involved a short flight of steps leading up to a segmental headed doorway at the corner of two streets. The corner section was surmounted by a segmental pediment which was broken by a stone panel topped with a triangular pediment and a finial.

The town centre was badly damaged by German shelling during the First World War. Such was the devastation that the minister of war, André Joseph Lefèvre, awarded the Legion of Honour to the town on a visit on 10 August 1920. After the war, the council led by the mayor, Arthur Lamendin, set about rebuilding the town centre. Work started on the new town hall in 1922. It was designed by Jean Goniaux in the neoclassical style, built with a reinforced concrete frame and was completed in 1926.

The design involved an asymmetrical main frontage of five bays facing onto what is now Avenue Arthur Lamendin with two wings projecting out to the rear. The left-hand bay contained a four-stage tower which was circa 30 metres (98 ft) high. There were four lancet windows in the first stage, a cross-window in the second stage, three rows of lancet windows in the third stage and a clock in the fourth stage, all surmounted by a steeple and a small octagonal bell tower. The central section of three bays featured three round headed openings with moulded surrounds and keystones on the ground floor and three cross-windows on the first floor, while the right-hand bay was fenestrated by a pair of widely set round headed windows on the ground floor and a pair of more closely set round headed windows on the first floor. Internally, the principal rooms were the Salle des Mariages (wedding room) and the Salle du Conseil (council chamber). Stained glass-windows, depicting local miners returning from work, were created by Alfred Labille and installed on the grand staircase. A plaque was installed to commemorate the lives of local service personnel who had died in the war.

The council relocated its administrative services to Les Grands Bureaux (The Grand Offices) on Rue Edouard-Vaillant in 2000. The building had been commissioned as the head office of the Liévin Mining Company in the early 20th century. An extensive programme of works to restore the town hall was completed at a cost of €2 million in 2018.
