= Liévin =

- Commune
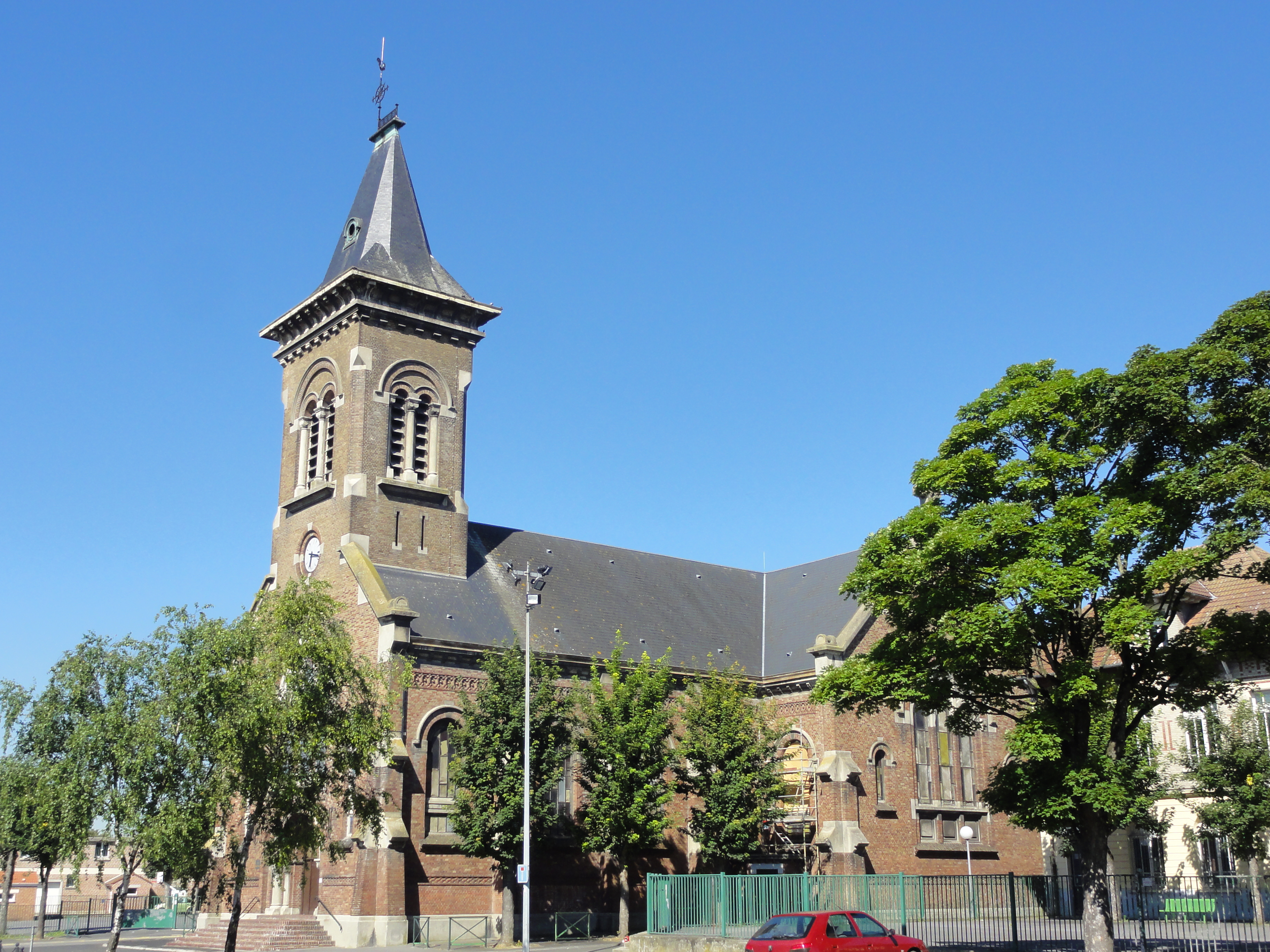
- The church of Saint-Amé of the mines of Lens, in Liévin

- Coat of arms
- Location of Liévin
- Location within France Location within Hauts-de-France
- Coordinates: 50°25′22″N 2°46′43″E
- Country: France
- Region: Hauts-de-France
- Department: Pas-de-Calais
- Arrondissement: Lens
- Canton: Liévin
- Intercommunality: CA Lens-Liévin

Government
  - Mayor (2020–2026): Laurent Duporge
- Area^{1}: 12.83 km^{2} (4.95 sq mi)
- Highest elevation: 80 m (260 ft)
- Lowest elevation: 32 m (105 ft)
- Population (2023): 30,063
  - Density: 2,343/km^{2} (6,069/sq mi)
- Time zone: UTC+01:00 (CET)
  - Summer (DST): UTC+02:00 (CEST)
- INSEE/Postal code: 62510 /62800
- ^{1} French Land Register data, which excludes lakes, ponds, glaciers > 1 km^{2} (0.386 sq mi or 247 acres) and river estuaries.

Liévin (French pronunciation: [ljevɛ̃]; Picard: Lévin; Dutch: Lieven) is a commune in the Pas-de-Calais department in northern France. The inhabitants are called Liévinois in French.

== Overview ==
The town of Liévin is an old mining area of Pas-de-Calais. Near Lens, this town is of modest size but has several nursery schools, schools, colleges, a university, a swimming pool, a city library, a cultural and social center (CCS), a hospital, a covered stadium, several gardens and parks, two movie theaters, two cemeteries, a Catholic church, a shopping center, a National Police station, a fire station, a complete intercommunity transportation system (Tadao ), regional newspapers, the main ones being L'Avenir de l'Artois [the Future of Artois], La Voix du Nord (Voice of the North) and Nord Éclair (Northern Flash), etc.

== Administration ==
Liévin is the seat of two cantons. It belongs to the Agglomeration community of Lens – Liévin) which consists of 36 communes, with a total population of 250,000 inhabitants.

== History ==
=== Prehistory and Middle Ages ===
The history of Liévin begins in ancient times. The foothill of Riaumont (highest point in Liévin) is a rich archaeological site. Traces of Neolithic and Gallo-Roman periods have been found there, and 752 tombs attest that Liévin was once a Merovingian burial ground.

In 1414, there were barely 150 inhabitants in Liévin. At that time, it was a village mainly concerned with agriculture. The population grew steadily until the First World War.

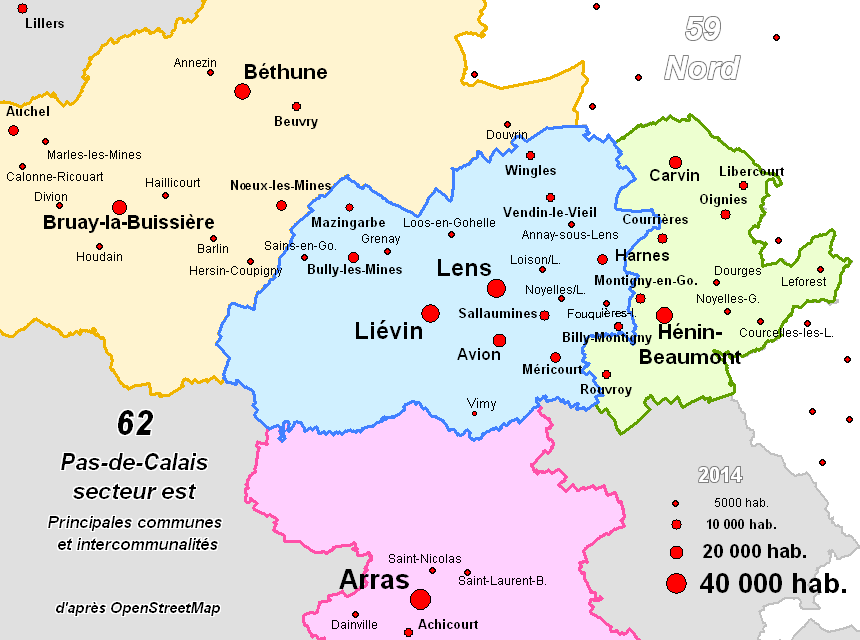
East of Pas-de-Calais (Béthune, Lens, Hénin-Beaumont)

- 600 inhabitants in 1759
- 900 inhabitants in 1789
- 1223 inhabitants in 1820

=== Industrial Revolution ===
Coal was discovered in the vicinity of Lens, Pas-de-Calais in 1849, and near Liévin in 1857. This precipitated a time of great productivity, prosperity, and population growth. The population of Liévin was 25,698 in 1914.

From 1858, the Lens mining company opened its pit no. 3 - 3 bis in the city, the Aix mining company its pit of Aix, which ten years later became no. 2 of Liévin, and the Liévin mining company its pit no. 1 bis - 1 ter. Secondary pits opened later. From 1899, the latter opened its pit no. 5 - 5 bis. During the 20th century, the Lens mining company opened its ventilation shafts no. 9 bis, 11 bis and 16 bis. The last shafts were backfilled in 1979, the installations were destroyed, with the exception of the headframes of shafts 1 bis and 3 bis.

=== World War I ===
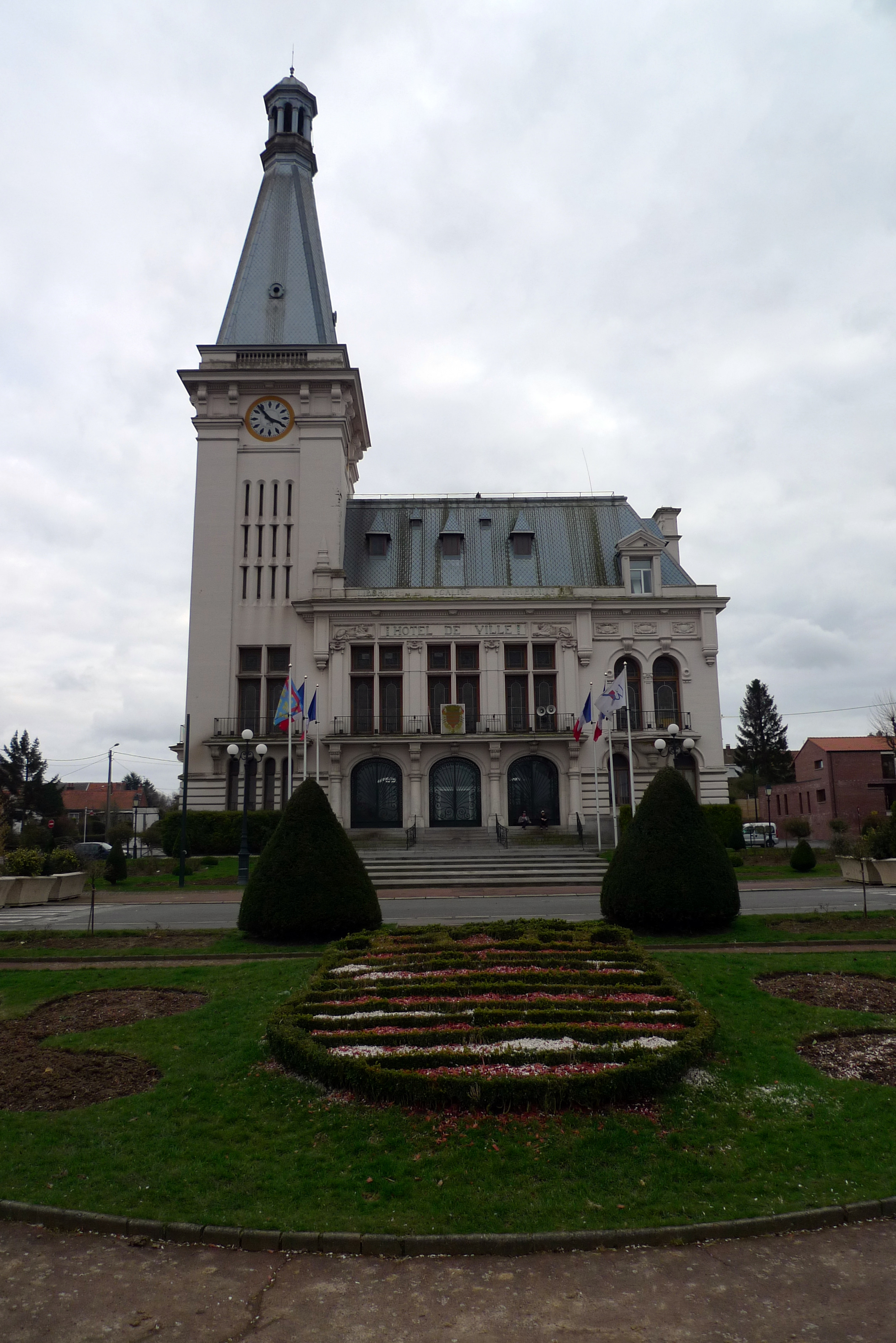
The Hôtel de Ville

The First World War brutally ended Liévin's expansion. The city was ruined, the churches and castles destroyed. Human losses were 400 civilian and 600 military, and it saw severe fighting during the Battle of Loos, which took place not far to the north. The city of Liévin was awarded the Croix de Guerre in 1920. After the war, it was necessary to rebuild everything. The Hôtel de Ville was completed in 1926.

After a few years, Liévin was again an active city, and mining recommenced. In 1936, the nearby (5.6 km) Canadian National Vimy Memorial was dedicated to the Battle of Vimy Ridge (part of the Battle of Arras) and the Canadian forces killed during the First World War; it is also the site of two WWI Canadian cemeteries.

=== World War II ===
World War II again stopped the progress of the city. In 1940, Liévin was evacuated, and the city was occupied by the Germans. Resistance was organized, in particular with the help of the Voix du Nord newspaper which is nowadays the main daily newspaper of Nord-Pas-de-Calais. In this war, there were 220 civilian and 225 military casualties. Liévin was liberated on 2 September 1944 by the British Eighth Army.

After the war, mining recommenced in force; coal mining was vital to the reconstruction of the French economy. Silicosis, which would kill many miners, made its appearance.

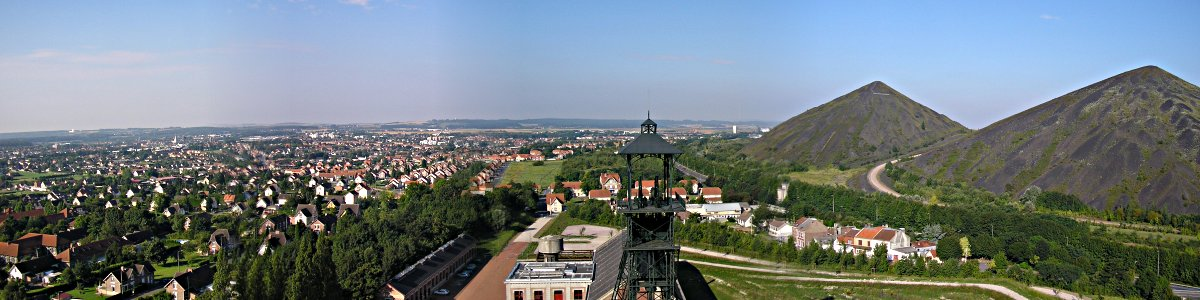
View of Liévin (left) taken in 2005 from the site Écopôle 11/19 in Loos-en-Gohelle (right).

=== End of coal mining ===
In addition to silicosis, miners were in daily peril of being lost in mining catastrophes. There were five major mining catastrophes during the coal mining period:

- 28 November 1861, pit no. 1, 2 dead
- 13 August 1882, pit no. 3, 8 dead
- 14 January 1885, pit no. 1, 28 dead
- 28 January 1907, pit no. 3, 3 dead
- 16 March 1957, pit no. 3, 10 dead
- 27 December 1974, Saint-Amé pit, 42 dead

Additionally, a recession in the mining industry began and with it a recession in Liévin. From 1960 to 1970, 60 of the 67 pits closed. Following the tragedy in pit number 3 in Saint-Amé, the last coal mining pit closed in 1974. Liévin no longer produces coal, and has moved on to a new chapter.

In 2014, French Prime Minister Manuel Valls commemorates the 40th anniversary of the Saint-Amé tragedy.

=== Liévin without coal and beginning of the 21st century ===
Liévin suffered a great deal when coal mining was abandoned, since it had depended primarily on the mines. The city converted to other industries. While it may not have the same economic dynamism of the earlier epoch, the commercial and industrial areas are a source of employment for many, and the city remains relatively prosperous with 33,430 inhabitants (see above).

A major storage facility for the Louvre is located in Liévin. It houses approximately 250,000 items.

On 2 February 2022 French current President Emmanuel Macron went to Liévin to the remembrance stone of Saint-Amé. With members of the Young Municipal Council, the mayor Laurent Duporge and his constituents, he laid a wreath of flowers in tribute to the 42 miners who died on 27 December 1974 in the biggest European post-war mining disaster: before him, Prime Ministers Jacques Chirac, Manuel Valls and President François Mitterrand had visited the site. He then participated in a work reunion with locals politicians, especially about the renovation of mining housing and the revitalization of the territory. At the end of the day, he visited the Louvre-Lens museum where students present The Seated Scribe, a famous work of ancient Egyptian art.

=== Lefebvre family and sinking of the Titanic ===
In 2017, a letter written in French is found sealed in a bottle on a beach in Hopewell Rocks, Bay of Fundy, in the Canadian province of New Brunswick. It claims to be written by Mathilde Lefebvre, a 12-year-old passenger of the Titanic travelling with her mother, brothers and sisters. The message says ""I am throwing this bottle into the sea in the middle of the Atlantic. We are due to arrive in New York in a few days. If anyone finds it, tell the Lefebvre family in Liévin".

In March 2022, Coraline Hausenblas, a psychomotricity specialist who carefully studied the letter, claims in a 51 pages report that the document is "fake, as long as it cannot be proved true". Even though the letter is fake, it sheds light on the history of this family. In 2002, the city of Liévin built a remembrance stone in tribute to the five family members who died during the sinking. In 1911, Franck Lefebvre, Mathilde's father, a 40-year-old coal miner, decided to settle in the United States thanks to a friend who also wanted to leave France and who offered him the trip. Franck arrived in the United States in March 1911 with one of his sons, Anselme, born in 1901, and settled in Iowa, where he worked in the Lodwick mines. During one year, he saved money and sent it to Liévin to allow his family to join him. In April 1912, his wife Marie Lefebvre, born Daumont (1872-1912), as well as their four children, Mathilde (1899-1912), 12-year-old, Jeanne (1903-1912), 8-year-old, Henri (1906-1912), 5-year-old and Ida (1908-1912), 3-year-old, left Liévin to join him. They embarked at Southampton on Wednesday 10 April 1912 aboard the Titanic in third class. The five family members died during the sinking and their bodies were never found. In the United States, while Franck is looking for them, the American administration realizes that he entered the territory illegally and he was expelled. He then returned to Liévin, became a coal miner again and died in 1948 in Haillicourt.

=== Mayors of Liévin since the French Revolution ===
- 1790–1810, Procope-Alexandre-Joseph de Ligne
- 1810–1819, Pierre Caron
- 1820–1822, Jacques Delaby
- 1822–1825, Pierre Caron
- 1825–1856, Henri-Antoine de Ligne
- 1856–1871, Nicolas Antoine Delaby
- 1871–1878, Alexandre-Procope Comte Jonglez de Ligne
- 1879–1892, Louis Schmidt
- 1892, Félix Pamart
- 1893–1905, Edouard Defernez
- 1905–1912, Arthur Lamendin
- 1912–1913, Pierre Leroy
- 1914, François Pouvier
- 1914–1919 : (evacuation)
- 1919–1925, Léon Degreaux
- 1925–1929, Jules Bédart
- 1930–1935, Silas Goulet
- 1936–1939, Henri-Joseph Thiébaut
- 1939–1944, Louis Thobois
- 1944–1945, Henri Bertin
- 1945–1947, Florimond Lemaire
- 1947–1952, Eugène Gossart
- 1952–1981, Henri Darras
- 1981–2013, Jean-Pierre Kucheida
- 2013–present, Laurent Duporge

== Population ==
Historical population

Year	Pop.	±% p.a.
1793	953	—
1800	1,038	+1.23%
1806	1,017	−0.34%
1821	1,223	+1.24%
1831	1,350	+0.99%
1836	1,336	−0.21%
1841	1,392	+0.82%
1846	1,432	+0.57%
1851	1,430	−0.03%
1856	1,449	+0.26%
1861	1,941	+6.02%
1866	2,075	+1.34%
1872	3,587	+9.55%
1876	5,463	+11.09%
1881	8,309	+8.75%
1886	10,718	+5.22%
1891	12,417	+2.99%
1896	14,014	+2.45%
1901	17,600	+4.66%

Year	Pop.	±% p.a.
1906	22,070	+4.63%
1911	25,698	+3.09%
1921	10,165	−8.86%
1926	24,054	+18.80%
1931	26,698	+2.11%
1936	25,127	−1.21%
1946	28,875	+1.40%
1954	31,808	+1.22%
1962	35,127	+1.25%
1968	35,853	+0.34%
1975	33,070	−1.15%
1982	33,096	+0.01%
1990	33,623	+0.20%
1999	33,427	−0.06%
2007	32,174	−0.48%
2012	31,580	−0.37%
2017	30,785	−0.51%
2023	30,063	−0.39%

Source: EHESS and INSEE (1968-2023)

== Notable people ==
Famous people from Liévin include:

- Georges Carpentier (boxer)
- Robert Enrico (film director)
- Arnold Sowinski (footballer)
- Mounir Chouiar (footballer)
- Jean-Marc Tellier (politician)

== International relations ==
Liévin is twinned with:

- Hohenlimburg, Germany (since 1962)
- Pasvalys, Lithuania (since 1999)
- Bruck an der Mur, Austria (since 1999)
- La Valette-du-Var, France (since 2000)
- Roccastrada, Italy
- Rybnik, Poland (since 2000)
