= Raoul Laparra =

French composer (1876–1943)

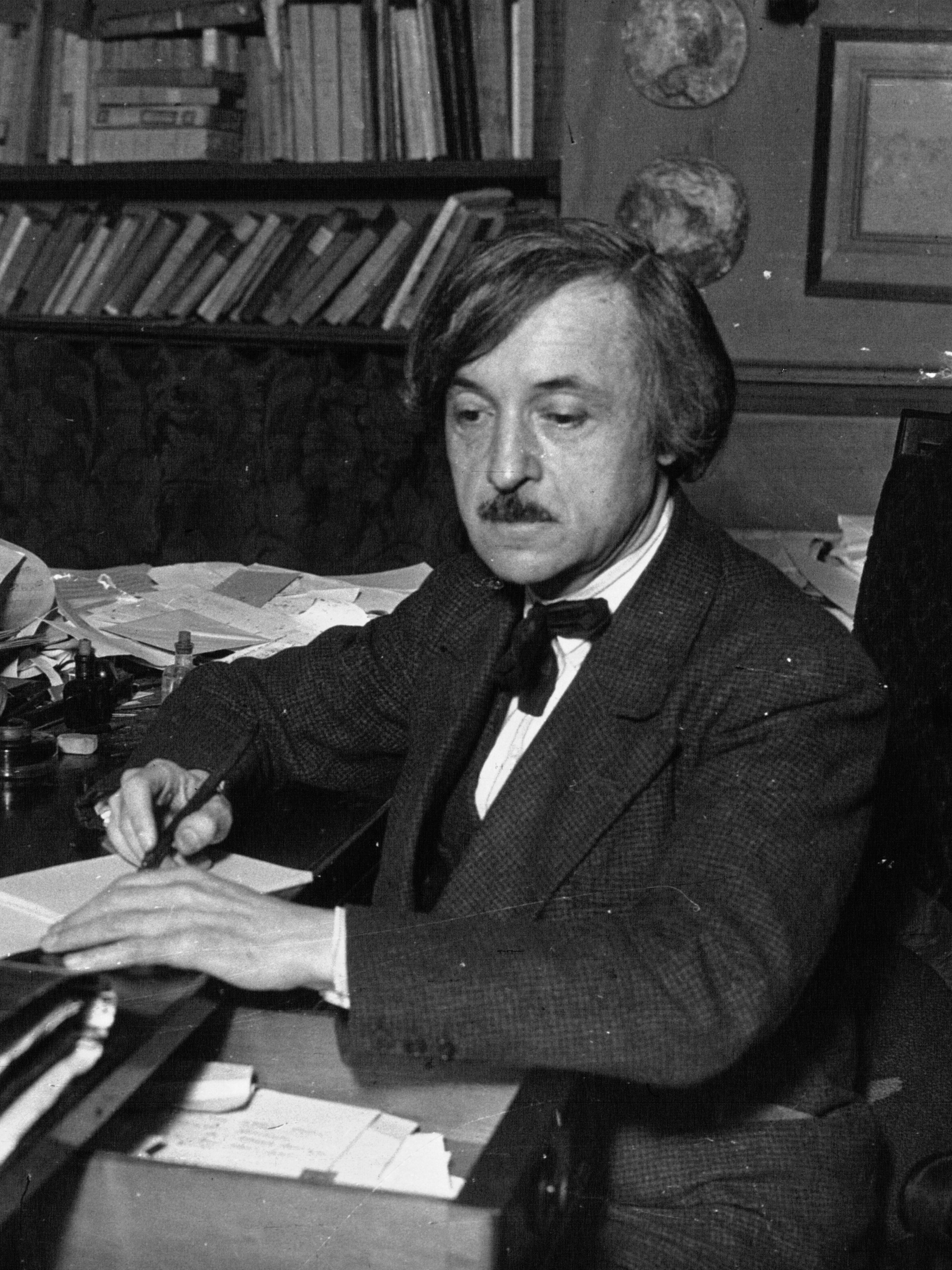
Raoul Laparra (1931)

Raoul Laparra (13 May 1876 – 4 April 1943) was a French composer.

== Life ==
Born in Bordeaux, Laparra studied at the Conservatoire de Paris with André Gedalge, Jules Massenet, Gabriel Fauré and Albert Lavignac. In 1903 he won the Premier Grand Prix de Rome with his cantata Alyssa.

Laparra worked as a music critic for the magazines Le Ménestrel and Le Matin and taught at the Conservatoire de Paris. Among his students were Claude Champagne and Cemal Reşit Rey. His compositions are often influenced by Spanish and Basque folk music.

He remains one of the masters of French Hispanism without remaining locked up in this speciality.

He was the brother of the painter William Laparra. He died during the bombing of Boulogne-Billancourt in 1943 and is buried in Chézy-sur-Marne.

== Selected works ==
- Peau d'âne, Opera, 1899
- La Habanera, Drame lyrique, 1900–1903
- Amphitryon, stage music for the play by Molière, 1904–1907
- La Jota, Conte lyrique, 1908–1911
- Suite ancienne en marge de Don Quichotte for violin or viola and piano, 1921
- Le Joueur de viole, Conte lyrique, 1925
- Le Livre de l'aurore, Suite for flute and piano, 1926
- Las Toreras, Zarzuela after Tirso de Molina, 1929
- L'Illustre Frégona, Zarzuela based on Miguel de Cervantes, 1931

== Bibliography ==
- Stéphan Etcharry, articles in Carlos Alvar, Gran Enciclopedia Cervantina, 10 volumes (Madrid: University of Alcalá, Centro de Estudios Cervantinos, Castalia editorial S. A., 2005), ISBN 8-4974-0177-8.
  - L'Illustre Fregona (Raoul Laparra)
  - Suite ancienne en marge de Don Quichotte (Raoul Laparra)
- Stéphan Etcharry, Le Prix de Rome de composition de 1903: La cantate Alyssa de Raoul Laparra. Essai de caractérisation du style musical, in Musiker. Cuadernos de Música, no. 16 (Donostia, Saint-Sébastien: Eusko Ikaskuntza [Société d'Études Basques], 2008), ISSN 1137-4470.
- Stéphan Etcharry, "'La Jota' (1911) à l'Opéra-Comique: L'Espagne noire de Raoul Laparra", in: Alexandre Dratwicki and Agnès Terrier (eds), Exotisme et art lyrique (Paris/Venice: Opéra-Comique/Palazzetto Bru Zane, Centre de musique romantique française, June 2012), published online on 26 September 2016, p. 1-27, bruzanemediabase.com.
- Samuel Llano, Whose Spain? Negotiating Spanish music in Paris, 1908–1929 (New York: Oxford University Press, 2013).
