= Domaine d'Orvès =

Arboretum and Provençal garden in France

Coordinates: 43.1445°N 5.9898°E

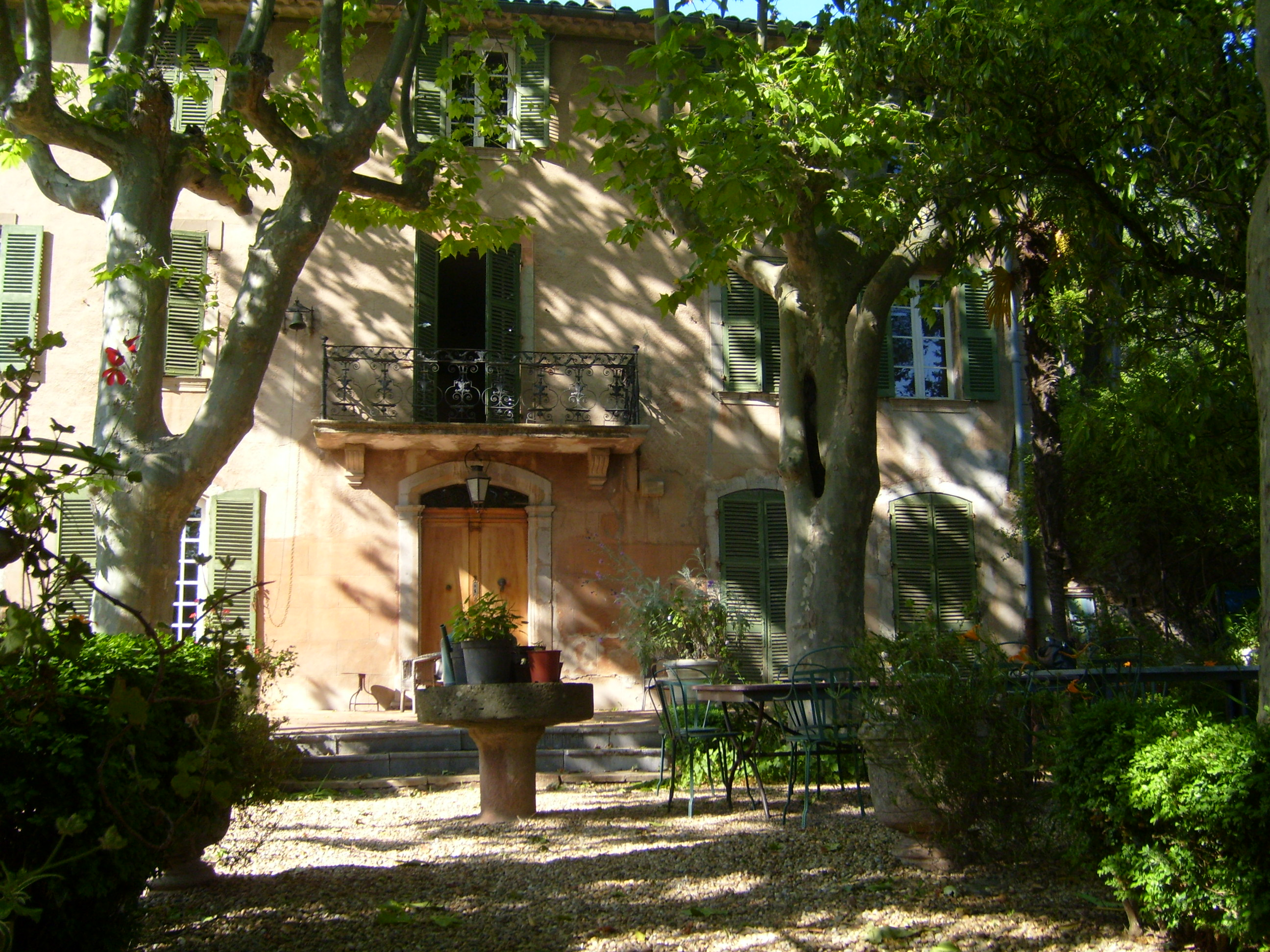
Bastide of the Domaine d'Orvès, Var Department

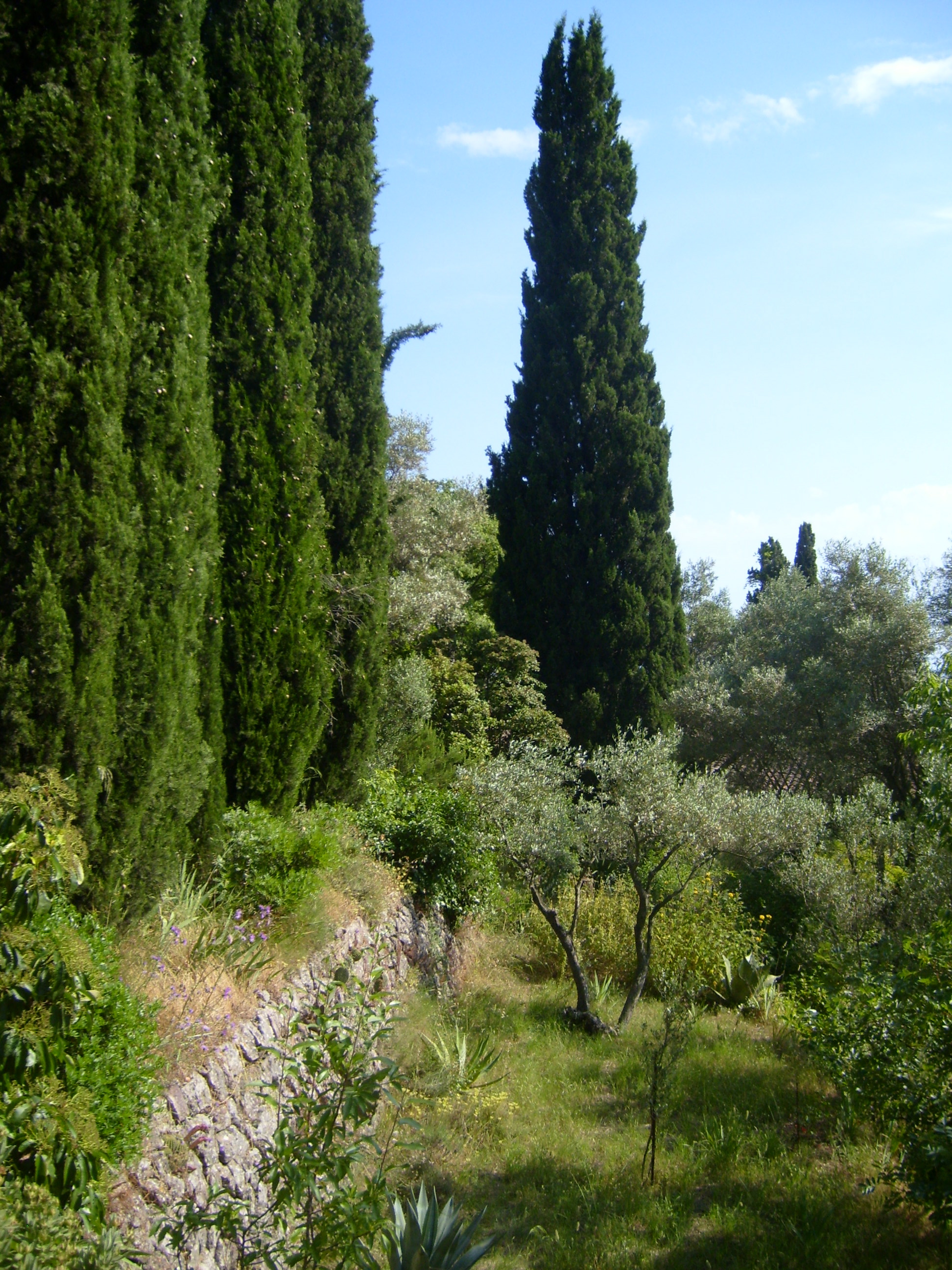
Domaine d'Orvès, Var Department, France

The Domaine d'Orvès is an arboretum and Provençal garden surrounding a 17th-century bastide located in the commune of La Valette du Var in the Var department of France. It is classified by the French Ministry of Culture as one of the Remarkable Gardens of France.

== Description ==
The garden surrounds a Provençal bastide at the foot of Mont Coudon. It features an alley of old olive trees, an alley of stairways bordered by very old plane trees, oleander trees, and an irrigation system using gravity and a system of wells, springs, fountains and basins at different levels. Trees in the garden include Photinia serratifolia, Cocculus laurifolius, pinus pinea, oleander. cypress, fig trees. pittosporum, pomegranate, wild quince trees, loquat trees, and persimmon trees.

== History ==
The house and gardens date to 1691. It belonged to the commune, was rented for a time by the Marquis de Castellane, and then was purchased by the painter Pierre Deval in 1925. During World War II the land was requisitioned by the German army for an artillery position, and many of the trees, including the rows of olive trees, were cut down. The Germans spared only the plane trees in front of the house, because they liked to have dinner in the shade of the trees. After the war Deval and his wife Henriette replanted the trees which had surrounded the house. Beginning in 1993, their daughter Françoise inherited the house and restored and added many new kinds of trees and plants to the gardens.

== See also ==
- List of botanical gardens in France
