= Mathilde Lefebvre letter =

Hoax carried out in relation to the Titanic

The Mathilde Lefebvre letter (French: lettre de Mathilde Lefebvre) is a hoax letter that was allegedly written by Mathilde Lefebvre, a young girl from Liévin, France who died in the sinking of the Titanic. Found in a bottle, it was forged by an anonymous individual.

In the spring of 2021, the French newspaper La Voix du Nord published an article entitled “Qui était Franck Lefebvre, l’Haillicourtois qui a perdu une partie de sa famille dans le naufrage du Titanic ?” (Who was Franck Lefebvre, the Hailourtois who lost part of his family in the sinking of the Titanic?) mentioning this document. After several specialists expressed doubts about the authenticity of the letter, it was revealed to be a hoax.

== Background ==
=== The Lefebvre family ===
Mathilde Lefebvre was born on 4 May 1899 at Liévin. She was the daughter of Franck Lefebvre and Marie Daumond.

Franck Lefebvre, a coal miner from Liévin in Pas-de-Calais, moved to Mystic, Iowa, United States in 1910. Once enough money was raised, he paid for his wife and children, who had stayed in France, for a trip aboard the Titanic, so that they could join him. Mathilde traveled with her mother Marie, her brother Henri and their sisters Ida and Jeanne from Southampton. They shared a third class cabin. None of the Lefebvre family aboard the Titanic survived.

== Start of the Mathilde Lefebvre case ==
=== Discovery of the letter ===
In 2017, a New Brunswicker contacted Antoine Resche, president of the French Titanic Association, to announce that he had found a bottle containing a letter in the Bay of Fundy. Dated April 1912, it was signed by Mathilde Lefebvre, who was travelling with her mother and her siblings in third class on the Titanic; all perished in the tragedy. The text read: “Je jette cette bouteille à la mer au milieu de l'Atlantique. nous devons arriver à New York dans quelques jours. Si quelqu'un la trouve, prévenez la famille Lefebvre à Liévin.” (In English: I am throwing this bottle into the sea in the middle of the Atlantic. We are due to arrive in New York in a few days. If anyone finds it, tell the Lefebvre family in Lievin.)

Antoine Resche advised the person who discovered the letter to have the bottle, the ink and the paper dated.

=== Publication in La Voix Du Nord ===
The case stalled until 2021, when a journalist from La Voix du Nord published an article entitled Qui était Franck Lefebvre, l’Haillicourtois qui a perdu une partie de sa famille dans le naufrage du Titanic ? (“Who was Franck Lefebvre, the Haillicourt man who lost part of his family in the sinking of the Titanic?”). From then on, the information was repeated in various news outlets, including France Bleu, L'indépendant, France Télévisions and RTL.

== First doubts ==
Very quickly, several specialists expressed doubts about the authenticity of the letter. Several points intrigue researchers, both in terms of the condition of the message and the message itself.

=== Handwriting ===
According to Franck Gavard-Perret, professor of geography history and Nicolas Beaudry, from the Uqar Archaeology and Heritage Laboratory, the handwriting attributed to Mathilde Lefebvre isn't like that expected from people of the working classes of the time, especially when compared with the correspondence of the Poilu of the Great War. Psychomotrician Coraline Hausenblas conducted a study of writing and concluded that “identity theft was carried out in order to carry out a hoax around a historical subject attracting the attention and sympathy of the public”. Several forms of writing had been used: cursive writing, but also script, common in the Anglo-Saxon world, but not in France

=== The text ===
The text does not contain much personal information, making it difficult to determine its authenticity. In the letter, Mathilde asks that anyone who finds her notify the Lefebvre family to Liévin. But Mathilde, her mother and her siblings were the last members of her family to leave Liévin to join the father of a family already settled in the United States. Why would she want a finder to contact the Lefebvre family in Liévin, when they no longer had close family there? Why, if she wanted to be contacted herself that her message had been found, didn't she ask to send the letter to her destination, Mystic, Iowa?

According to Antoine Resche, this can be explained as follows: “If we start from the premise that the document is a forgery, it is very easy to explain: it is much more common to find the city of origin of the Lefebvre's Family than their destination...and a forger did not necessarily have this information”.

=== The bottle ===
The bottle used to convey the message is a small glass bottle, intended for liquors or perfumes. It is known that third class passengers often travelled with little luggage: such an empty bottle would therefore have had little room in the Lefebvre's luggage, which had to be limited to the essentials. According to Antoine Resche, "Such bottles would certainly not have been available in the third class dining room, which did not offer self-service liquors. A lone mother traveling with children who did not speak English would also have had a difficult time obtaining them from the crew". Although researchers have stated that the bottle is “consistent with the early 20th century. You can find vintage bottles in an apothecary's shop, but that doesn't ensure that it was discarded in 1912.”

=== Wax ===
The bottle was supposed to have been in the water for over a century. In order for the message not to be affected by moisture, a very generous amount of wax would have had to be applied to the neck. It is difficult to explain how Mathilde could have obtained so much wax on board.

=== The place where the bottle was found ===
The bottle was found stranded in the Bay of Fundy, New Brunswick. According to ocean current specialists, if such a drift from the site of the sinking was not impossible, it remains highly improbable. This improbability must therefore be coupled with all the other improbabilities mentioned above.

== Aftermath ==
In order to be able to prove with certainty that the recovered letter was indeed written by Mathilde Lefebvre, it would be necessary to have authentic samples of Mathilde Lefebvre's handwriting for comparison. However, there are no known samples of her handwriting.

In the end, newspapers such as Le Point and several others have admitted that Mathilde Lefebvre's letter was a hoax.

The only consequence was to give visibility to a family involved in the Titanic disaster that until then had been little known.
