= La Valette-du-Var =

La Valette-du-Var La Valeta (Occitan)
- Commune
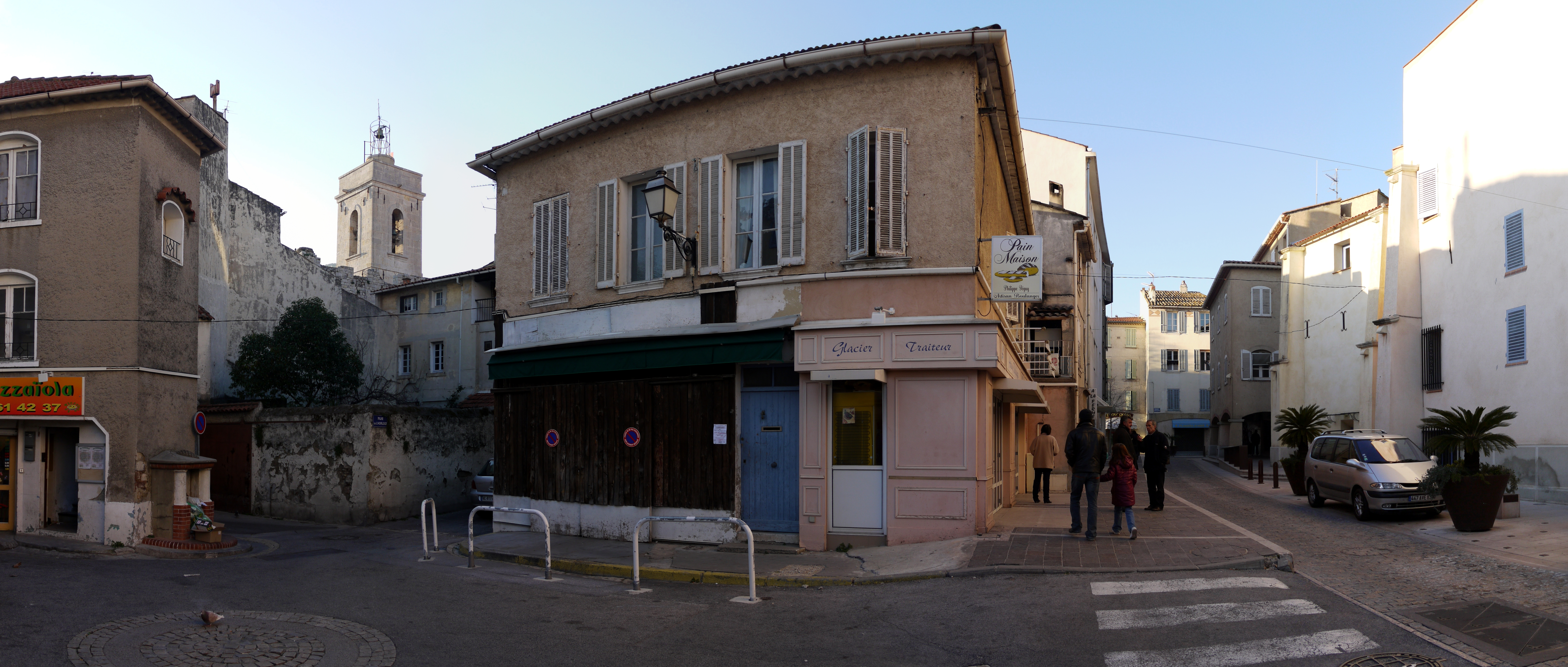
- A view within the village of La Valette-du-Var

- Coat of arms
- Location of La Valette-du-Var
- Location within France Location within Provence-Alpes-Côte d'Azur
- Coordinates: 43°08′18″N 5°58′59″E
- Country: France
- Region: Provence-Alpes-Côte d'Azur
- Department: Var
- Arrondissement: Toulon
- Canton: Toulon-3
- Intercommunality: Métropole Toulon Provence Méditerranée

Government
  - Mayor (2020–2026): Thierry Albertini
- Area^{1}: 15.5 km^{2} (6.0 sq mi)
- Elevation: 64 m (210 ft)
- Highest elevation: 701 m (2,300 ft)
- Lowest elevation: 37 m (121 ft)
- Population (2023): 23,719
  - Density: 1,530/km^{2} (3,960/sq mi)
- Demonym: Valettois
- Time zone: UTC+01:00 (CET)
  - Summer (DST): UTC+02:00 (CEST)
- INSEE/Postal code: 83144 /83160
- Website: www.lavalette83.fr
- ^{1} French Land Register data, which excludes lakes, ponds, glaciers > 1 km^{2} (0.386 sq mi or 247 acres) and river estuaries.

La Valette-du-Var (French pronunciation: [la valɛtdyvaʁ]; Occitan: La Valeta; Provençal: La Valeto) is a commune in the Var department in the Provence-Alpes-Côte d'Azur region in Southeastern France.

== History ==
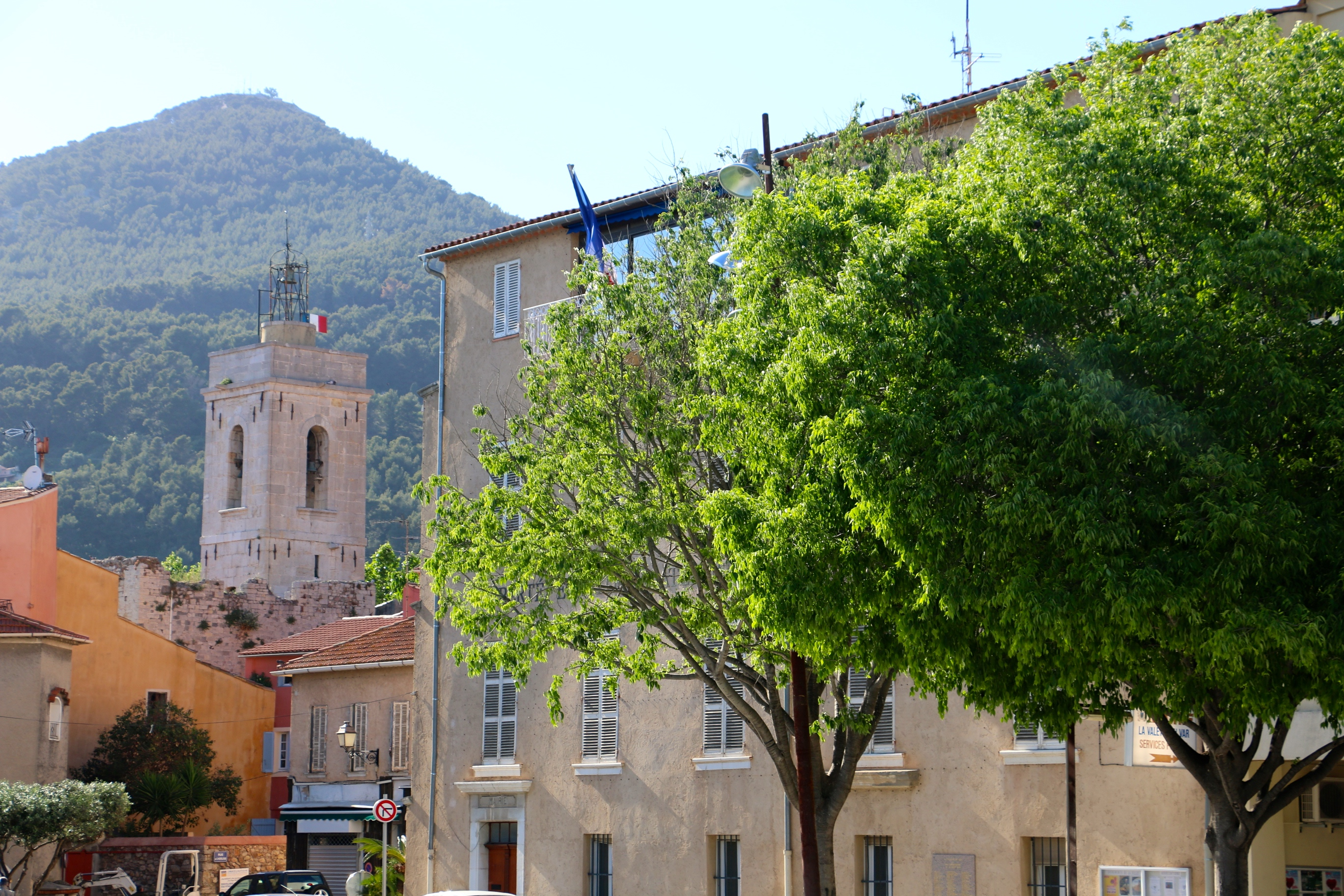
The Hôtel de Ville (on the right)

The current Hôtel de Ville was established in 1993.

== Population ==
Historical population

Year	Pop.	±% p.a.
1793	2,311	—
1800	2,152	−1.01%
1806	2,206	+0.41%
1821	2,015	−0.60%
1831	2,450	+1.97%
1836	2,267	−1.54%
1841	2,231	−0.32%
1846	2,275	+0.39%
1851	2,337	+0.54%
1856	2,127	−1.87%
1861	2,101	−0.25%
1866	2,125	+0.23%
1872	2,180	+0.43%
1876	2,127	−0.61%
1881	2,186	+0.55%
1886	2,196	+0.09%
1891	2,262	+0.59%
1896	2,470	+1.77%
1901	2,623	+1.21%

Year	Pop.	±% p.a.
1906	2,837	+1.58%
1911	2,853	+0.11%
1921	2,847	−0.02%
1926	3,108	+1.77%
1931	3,455	+2.14%
1936	4,011	+3.03%
1946	5,055	+2.34%
1954	5,194	+0.34%
1962	6,949	+3.71%
1968	11,194	+8.27%
1975	14,745	+4.01%
1982	18,296	+3.13%
1990	20,687	+1.55%
1999	21,739	+0.55%
2007	22,282	+0.31%
2012	21,155	−1.03%
2017	23,884	+2.46%
2023	23,719	−0.12%

Source: EHESS and INSEE (1968–2023)

== Features ==
La Valette-du-Var is home to two of the Jardins remarquable of France: the Domaine d'Orvès and the Domaine de Baudouvin.

== Notable people ==
- The painter Pierre Deval (1897 – 1993) lived here, where he purchased the Domaine d'Orvès in 1925.
- The village cemetery contains the grave of Joseph Pujol, who died in 1945 and who, under his stage name of "Le Pétomane", was a famous flatulist.

== Twin towns – sister cities ==
La Valette-du-Var is twinned with:

- Bocșa, Romania (1990)
- Krościenko nad Dunajcem, Poland (2005)
- Liévin, France (2001)
- Novocherkassk, Russia (1992)
- Somma Lombardo, Italy (1997)
- Villingen-Schwenningen, Germany (1974)

== See also ==
- Communes of the Var department
