= Domaine de Baudouvin =

Estate, garden and public park in southern France

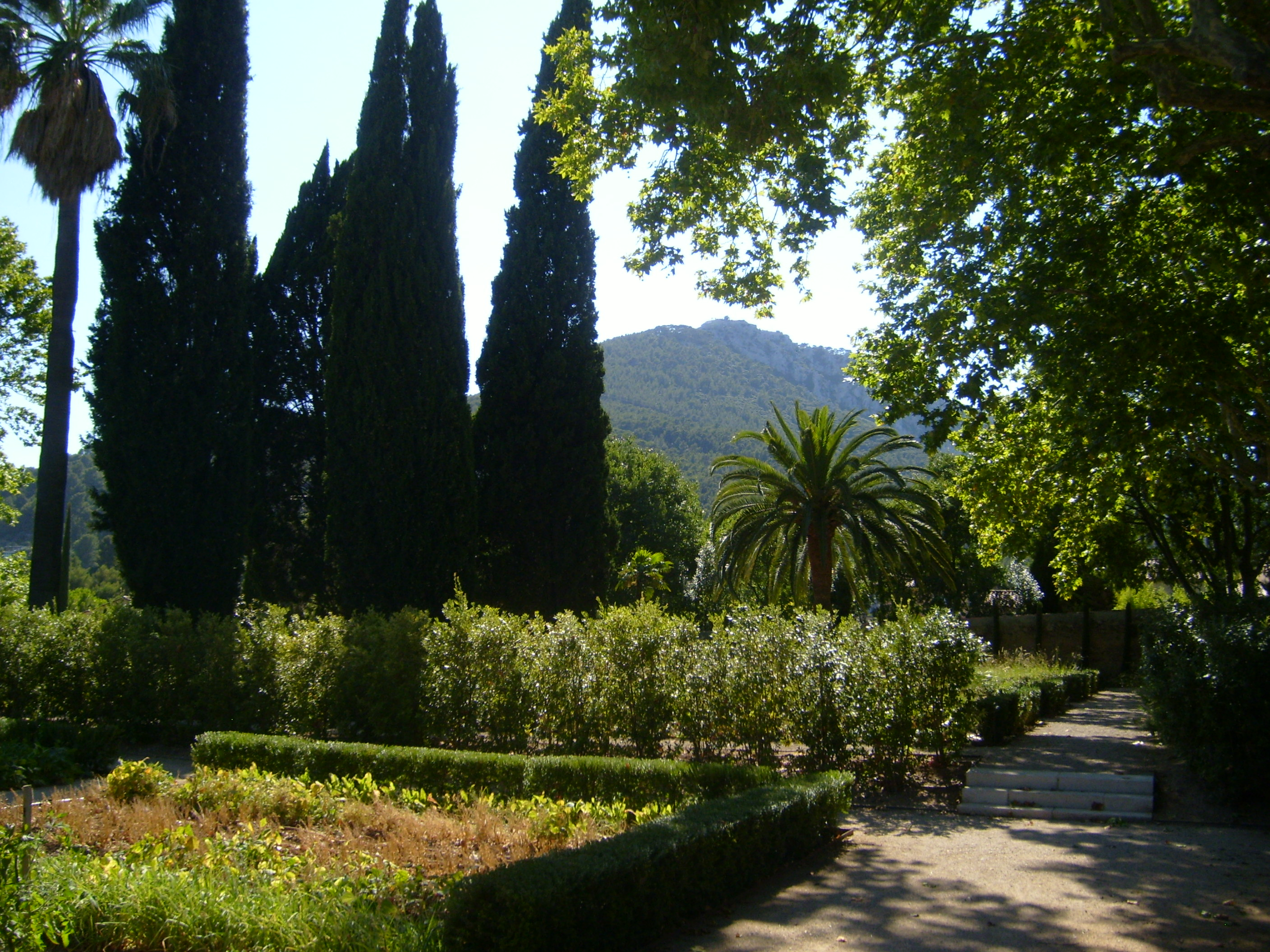
Domaine de Baudouvin, La Valette-du-Var, France

The Domaine de Baudouvin (French pronunciation: [dɔmɛn d(ə) boduvɛ̃]) is an estate, garden and public park in the commune of La Valette-du-Var, just east of Toulon, in the Var departement of France. Formerly owned by the banker Henri de Rothschild and then the residence of the maritime prefect of Var, it became a public park in 1986. It features the trees, flowers and plants of Provence, the Mediterranean and the tropics, and includes a grand alley of plane trees, a giant bougainvillia, spring-fed fountains and basins, orchards, kitchen gardens and vineyards, a solar-powered "orchard" cooled by mist, and a view of the mountains of the Var. It is classified by the French Ministry of Culture as one of the Remarkable Gardens of France.

== History ==
The Fief of Baudouvin (the Provençal spelling of Boudouin) is mentioned for the first time in 1437, when René of Anjou, the last Count of Provence, authorized the donation of the castle of La Valette, and the domaine of Baudouvin, which depended upon it, to Eléon de Glandevès, the Seigneur of La Garde. The act of donation mentioned that the domaine included several springs, and extended from Mont Coudon to the town of Salliès-Ville.

Gaspard de Thomas, the Baron de la Garde, sold the domaine in 1612 to Claude Cabisson, the ecuyer of La Valette. It remained in his family until the domaine passed by marriage to the family of Jacques de Rippert, the Seigneur of Revest.

The old manor house was demolished in 1785, and replaced by the current house.

After the French Revolution, the house became the property of the family of a M. Benet. In 1926 it was purchased by the banker Henri de Rothschild. His chief gardener and manager, Bonnefoy, planted the current gardens, orchards and vineyards.

After World War II it became the official residence of the prefet maritime of the Var, then, in 1986, it became the property of the town of La Valette-du-Var. The town later commissioned the landscape architecture firm of Alep to add contemporary gardens to the original gardens created by Henri de Rothschild. The Domaine reopened in its present form in 2009.

== Description ==
The park is located at the foot of Mount Coulon. A long alley of plane trees leads through orchards and vineyards to the house, built in 1785, which is now a gallery for exhibitions. A fountain and terrace are located in front of the house.

The kitchen gardens reflect the history of La Valette, which traditionally produced watercress, strawberries, and lemons, which were provided for the crews of ships departing from Toulon for long voyages.

The park includes a gardens of aromatic and medicinal plants; bamboo and other tropical plants; citrus trees; vegetable gardens; a terrace for viewing the large basin and Mount Coulon; and a "solar garden" composed of masts with solar panels, which generate electricity and also produce a cooling mist in summer.

Water for the domaine is supplied by a natural spring, the Source de la Foux, which feeds the fountains, a large basin, small cascades, and channels that carry water to the orchards and gardens.

== Gallery of the Domaine de Baudouvin ==
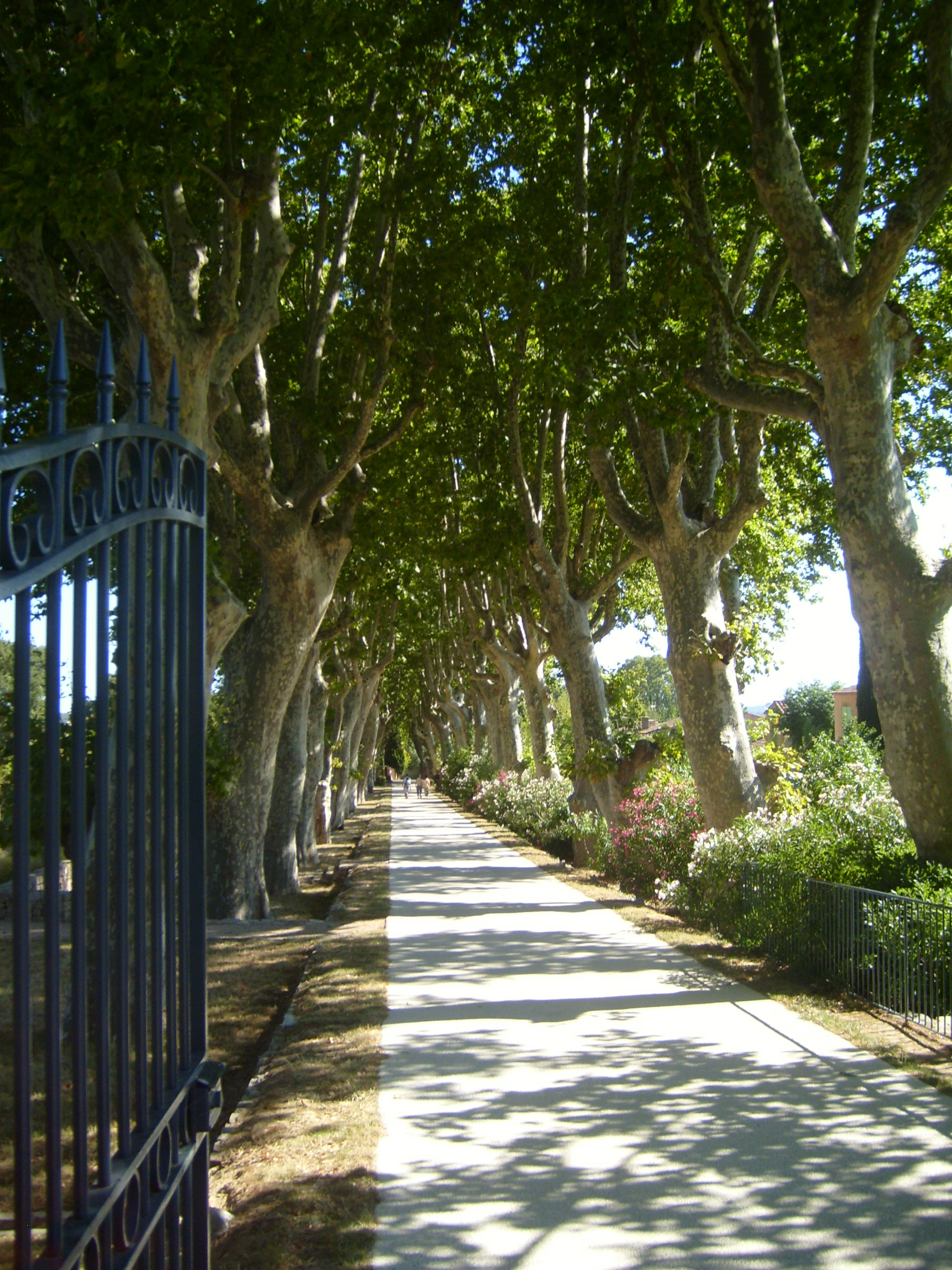
Alley of plane trees at entrance of Domaine de Baudouvin

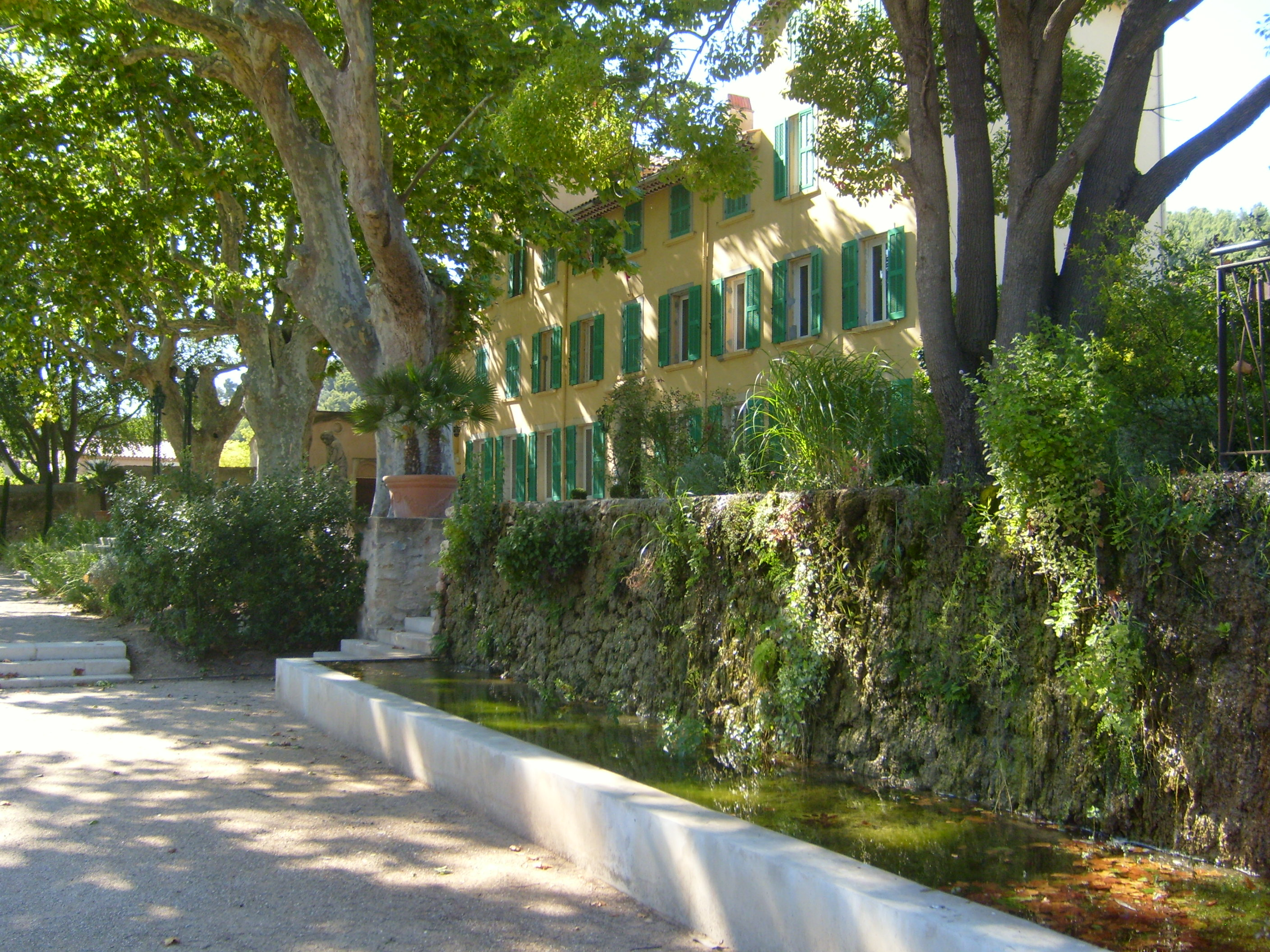
the house, built in 1785, and a spring-fed basin and fountain at the Domaine de Baudouvin

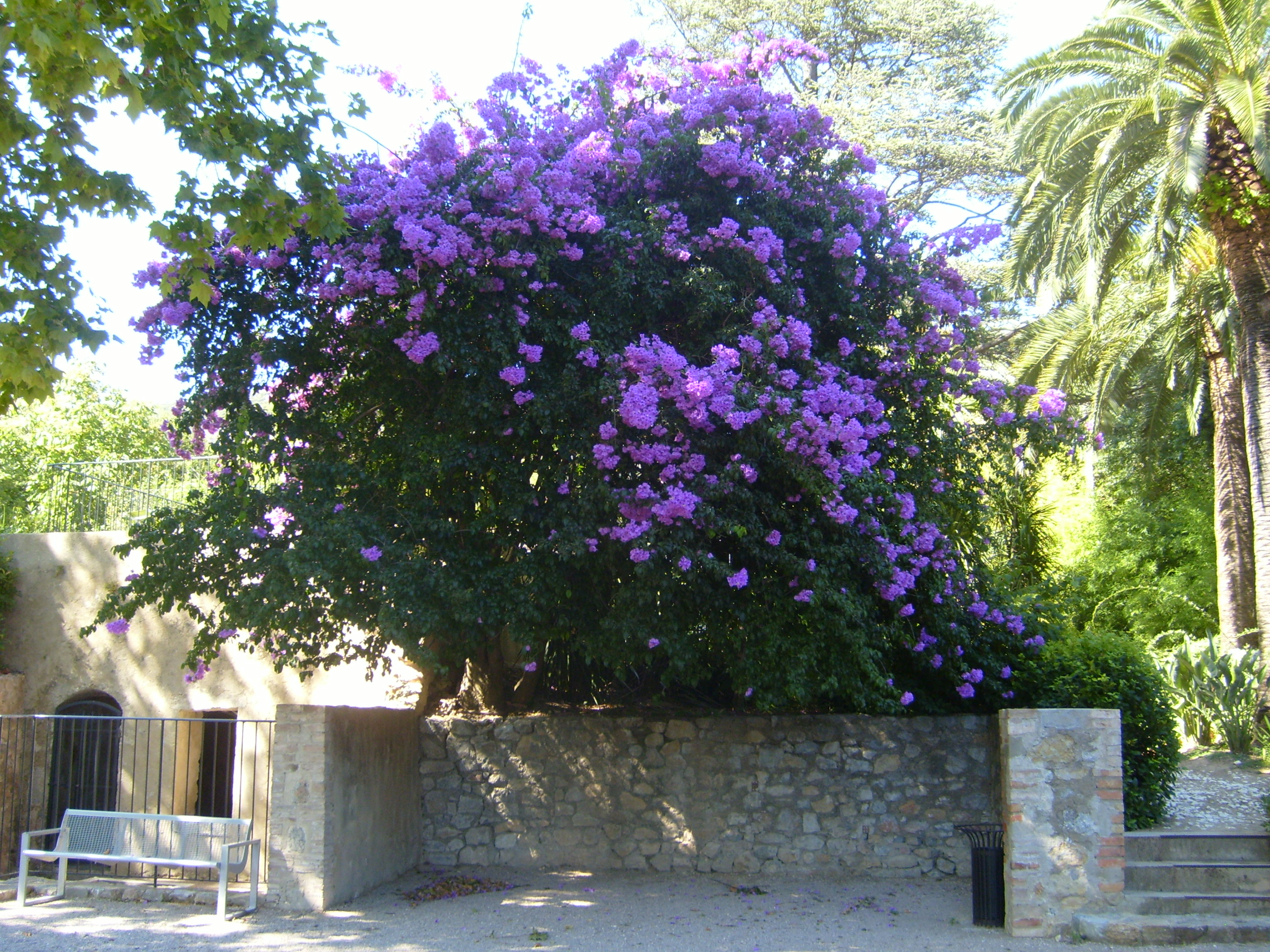
Giant bougainvillea in the Domaine de Baudouvin

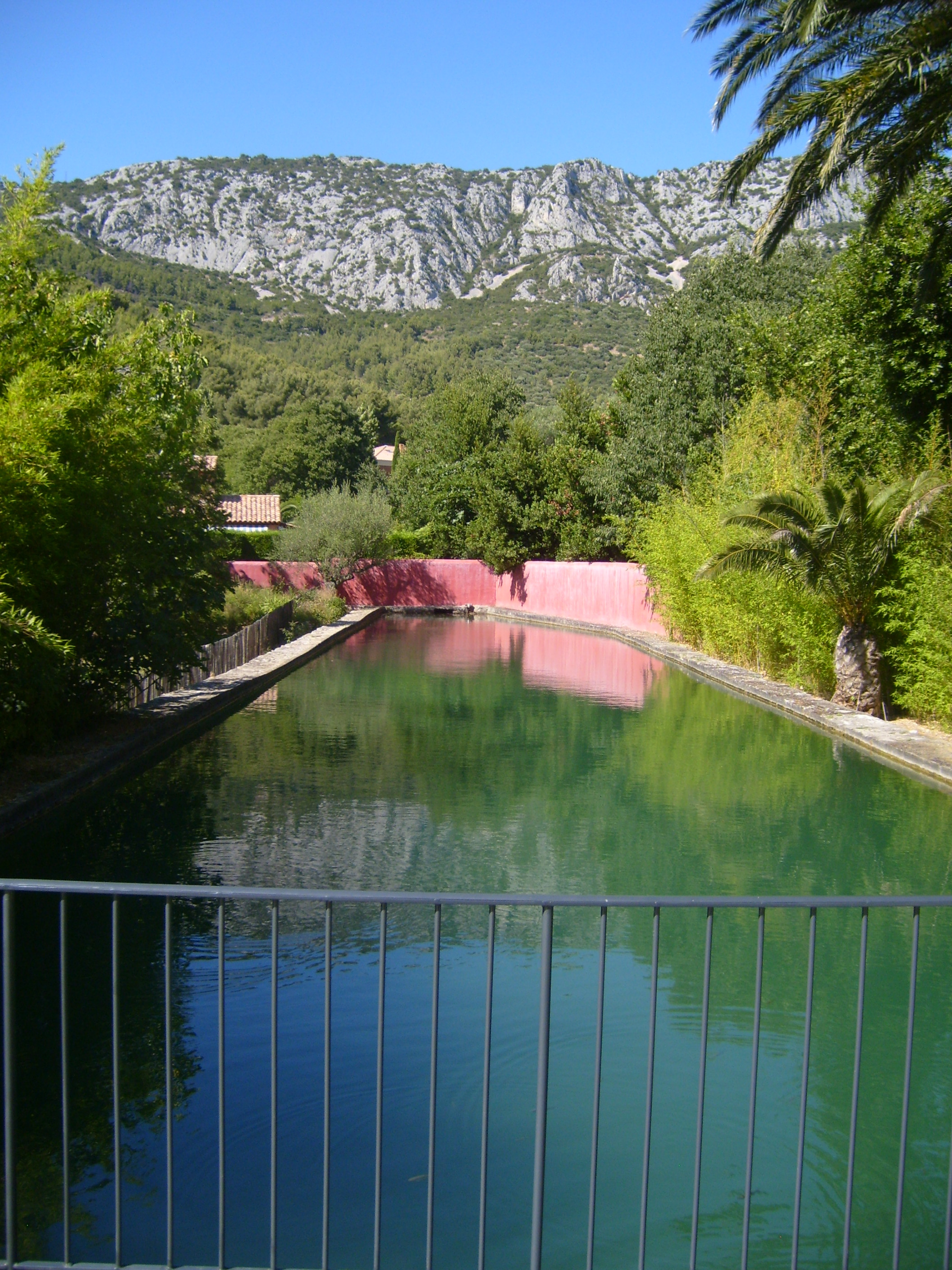
Spring-fed basin in the Domaine de Baudouvin

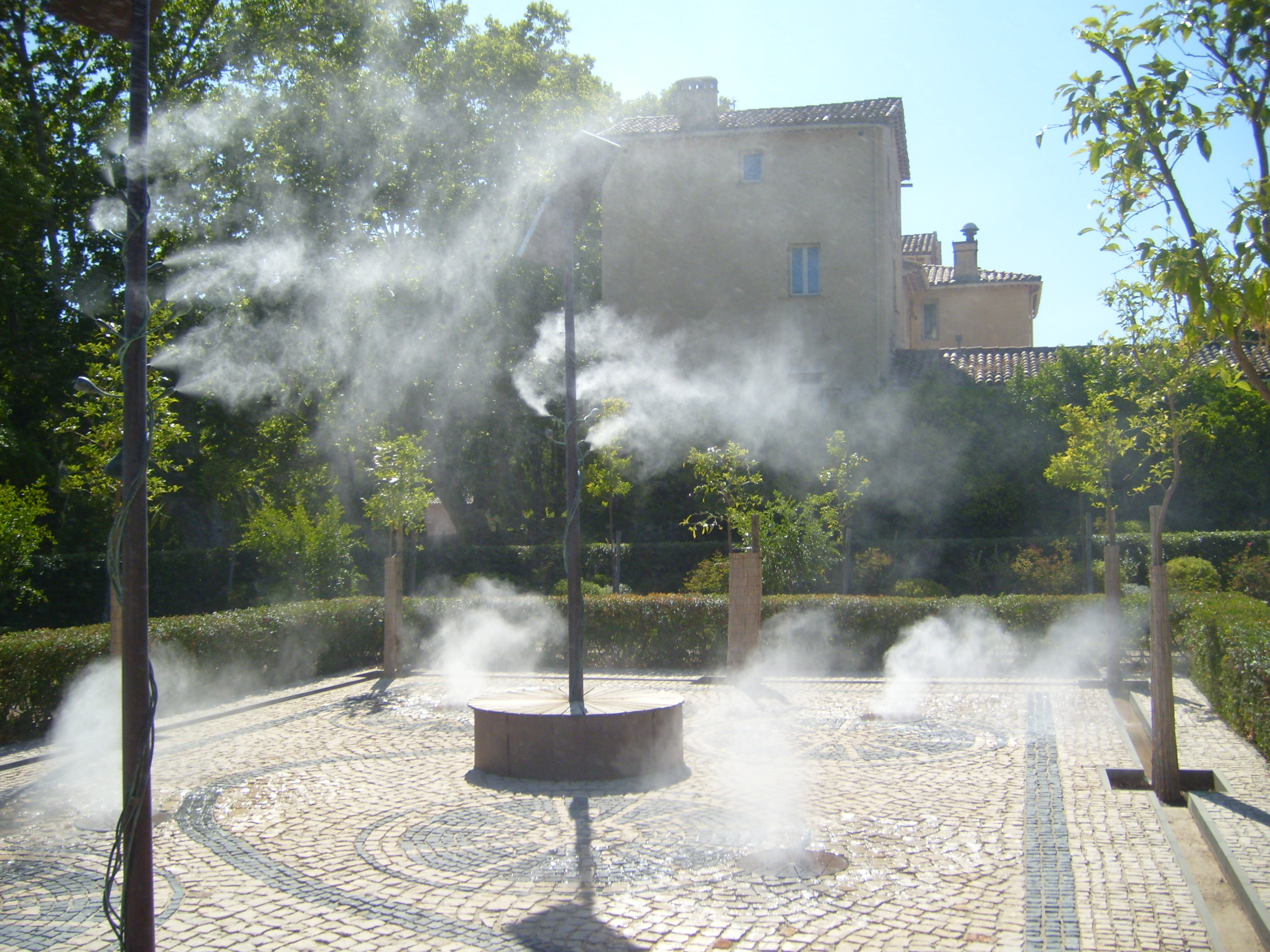
The Solar Garden, where masts with solar panels generate electricity and produce a cool mist in summer
