= William Laparra =

French painter (1873–1920)

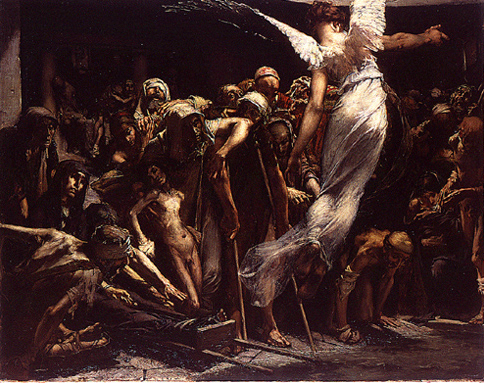
The Pool of Bethsaida

William Julien Emile Edouard Laparra (25 November 1873, Bordeaux - 5 September 1920, Valle de Hecho) was a French painter of portraits and genre scenes. The composer, Raoul Laparra, was his younger brother.

== Biography ==
His father, Joseph Edouard Laparra (1850-?), was a merchant who originally came from Spain. He began his artistic education at the École de Dessin de Bordeaux then, in 1892, went to Paris to study at the Académie Julian, where his instructors included William Bouguereau, Tony Robert-Fleury and Jules Joseph Lefebvre. He was awarded the Prix de Rome at the age of twenty-two for his painting depicting the Pool of Bethsaida.

In 1902, he married Franciszka Wanda Landowska (1879-1904); sister of the sculptor Paul Landowski. He also became acquainted with the painter, Ignacio Zuloaga, who was then living in Paris, and exhibited frequently in several venues, including the Salon. Later, he served as a Professor at the Académie Julian. A few years after Franciszka's early death, he married Fanny Bertrand (1889-1939); daughter of the geologist, Marcel Alexandre Bertrand, and sister of the painter, Claire Bertrand.

As the son of a Spaniard, he was influenced by that country's culture and took an extended trip there from 1908 to 1909; stopping in Burgos, Madrid and Toledo. Upon returning, he settled in Boulogne-Billancourt. He would also travel throughout Italy, Greece and Egypt.

In addition to painting, he maintained an interest in the social issues of his time, which was reflected in some of his major works; such as "The Steps of Jacques Bonhomme"', which was shown at the "Verrerie ouvrière d'Albi", one of the first workers' cooperatives in France.

His favorite subjects for genre scenes involved daily life among the peasantry; treated in a harsh, somber style, but his portraits tended to more cheerful and featured bourgeoise subjects. Several retrospectives have featured his works; notably at Bordeaux in 1997. Over 100 of his works have been acquired by the Réunion des musées nationaux. His works may be seen at the Musée du Louvre, Musée d'Orsay, École nationale supérieure des beaux-arts, Musée des beaux-arts de Bordeaux and the Musée des beaux-arts de Rouen, among many others.

== Other selected paintings ==
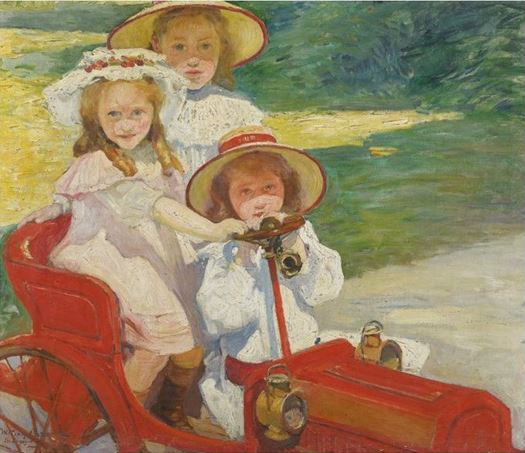
The Red Automobile

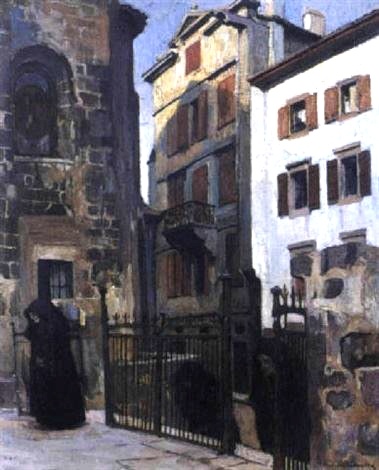
Leaving the Mass

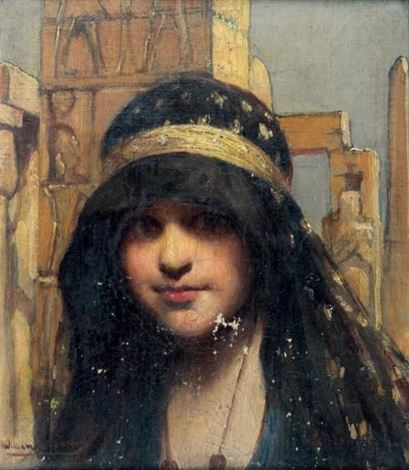
Young Egyptian Woman

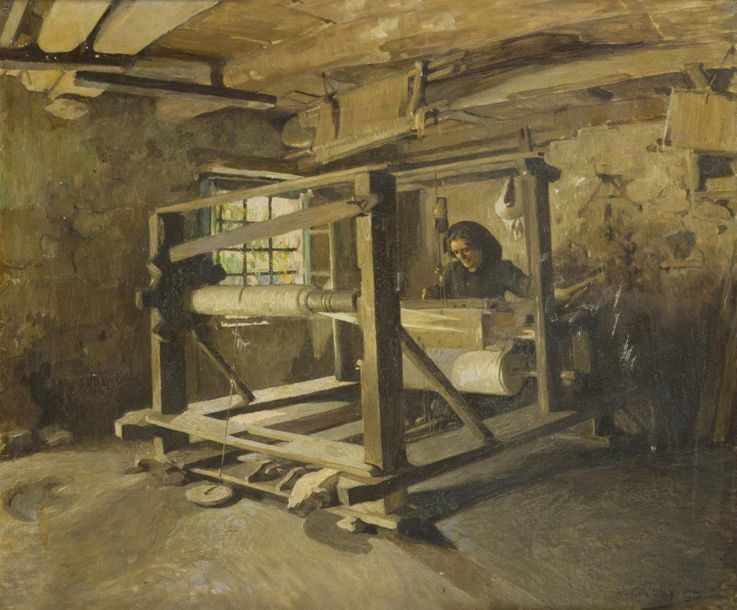
The Weaver
