= Salon nautique international de Paris =

The Paris Boat Show, also known as "Nautic" or the "Salon Nautic," is an annual French trade show held at the Paris Expo Porte de Versailles in Paris. It runs for nine days, spanning two weekends and the intervening week in early December.

== Organization ==
The Nautic has an annual attendance of around 200,000 visitors (206,000 in 2017). The new nautical innovations for the coming season are presented:

- sailing and motor boats, rigid and semi-rigid, as well as all their equipment and accessories;
- board sports: windsurfing, stand-up paddle, kitesurfing, wing foiling, canoeing, water skiing, wakeboarding, etc.
- services to boaters;
- maritime and river rental operators;
- tourist destinations which present the offer present in their territory.

In 2021, for its 60th edition, it was a showcase made up of 785 exhibitors, 1,300 brands, 650 sailing and motor boats exhibited over 100,000 m2 which brought together 200,000 visitors, 4,500 boating professionals and 450 accredited journalists.

== History ==
The first show dedicated to boats in Paris was held at the Grand Palais and on the banks of the Seine in 1926. Until the beginning of the 1960s, boating in France was limited to a fairly closed circle of practitioners. However, in 1962, under the leadership of a few enthusiasts like J.P. Jouët, R. Mallard, B. Godefroy, J. Gaudin and C. Perretie who created the National Union of Manufacturers and Traders in Navigation and Pleasure Equipment, a new pleasure craft show was created in 1962 at the CNIT. The building is then just one building in the middle of the immense field of work that is the new Parisian business district La Défense.

This is how the first international boat show in Paris will take place. It was also in 1962 that the foundations of the Federation of Nautical Industries (FIN) were born, but it was in 1964 that the FIN was officially created and the event became a little more important each year.

The year 1964 will also be what many consider to be the true beginning of the democratization of yachting in France. Navigator Éric Tabarly will be the symbol and vector of this new attraction for the boat with his first victory in the English Transat. It was also at the boat show in 1965 that General de Gaulle came to congratulate him on this success and to inaugurate the show.

The first edition brought together 58,000 visitors over 23,000 m2. Attendance records were then reached in the 1990s with more than 300,000 visitors, to now stabilize in a slightly more complicated economic context at around 200,000 visitors.

Since 2010, Nautic has also organized the Nautic Paddle, a stand-up paddle race on the Seine, during the first Sunday of the show. Having become over the years the largest race of its kind globally, the Nautic Paddle welcomed, during its last edition in 2021, 1000 participants including 36 women, from 41 nationalities.

In 2022, the event, renamed the Seine Boat Show, attracted 152,000 visitors. The 2023 edition has been canceled. That of 2024 was to take place in October, but was postponed, then canceled.
