= Willy Eisenschitz =

French painter (1889–1974)

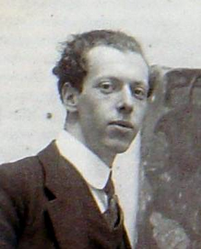
Willy Eisenschitz in 1910.

Willy Eisenschitz (27 October 1889 – 8 July 1974) was a French painter of Austrian origin who mostly represented the landscapes of Provence and Drome in particular. His works are presented in a dozen European museums, and are the subject of retrospective exhibitions from 1957 to 2006.
