= Parrocel family =

French family of painters

The Parrocel family was a French family of painters, including

- Georges Parrocel (c. 1540, Montbrison - c. 1614, Montbrison)
- Barthélemy Parrocel (c. 1595, Montbrison - 1658 or 1660, Brignoles), brother of Georges
- Jean Barthélemy Parrocel (1631–1667), son of Barthélemy
- Louis Parrocel (1634–1703), son of Barthélemy
- Joseph Parrocel (1646–1704), son of Barthélemy
- Pierre Parrocel (1670, Avignon - 1739, Paris), son of Louis
- Jacques-Ignace Parrocel (1667, Avignon - 1722, Mons), son of Louis and brother of Pierre
- Étienne Parrocel (1696–1775)
- Charles Parrocel (1688–1752), battle painter, youngest son of Joseph
- Joseph-Ignace Parrocel (1704–1781)
- Joseph-François Parrocel (1704, Avignon - 1781, Paris), son of Pierre
