= Sostratus =

Sostratus (Σώστρατος Sostratos) may refer to:

- Sostratos of Aegina, Greek merchant
- Sostratos of Chios, ancient Greek sculptor
- Sostratus of Cnidus, designer of the Lighthouse of Alexandria
- Sostratus of Dyme, Greek mythological hero and friend of Hercules
- Sostratus of Macedon, conspirator against Alexander the Great
- Sostratus of Pellene, runner and Olympic winner
- Sostratus of Sicyon, Olympic pankratiast
