= Queen of Heaven in Catholic art =

Depiction of the Virgin Mary in Catholic art

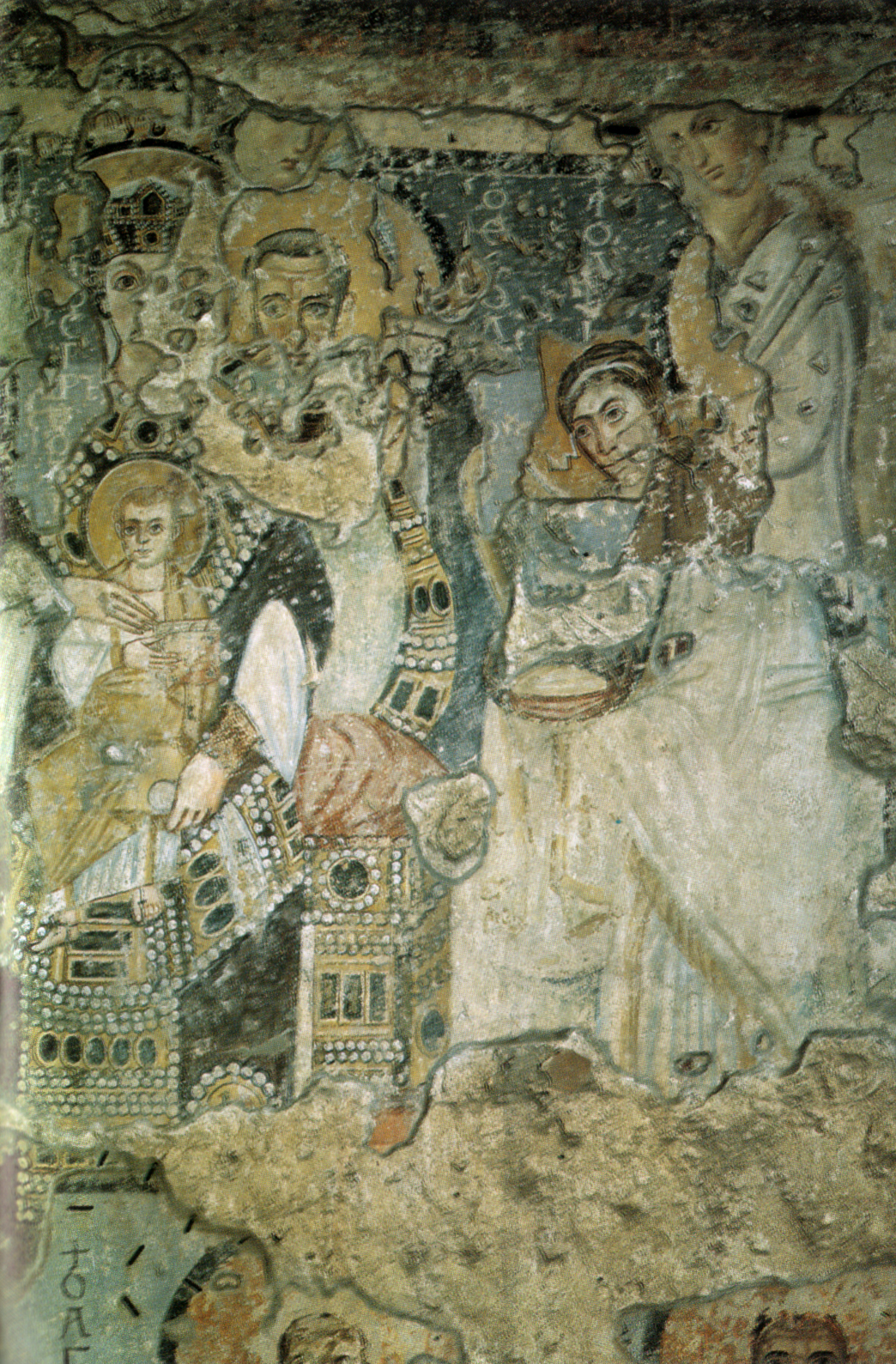
Earliest known (6th century) Roman depiction of Santa Maria Regina (Saint Mary the Queen), Santa Maria Antiqua church, Rome.

The depiction of the Virgin Mary as the Queen of Heaven has been a popular subject in Catholic art for centuries.

Early Christian art shows Mary in an elevated position. She carries her divine son Jesus in her hands, or holds him. After he ascended into heaven to reign in divine glory, Mary, his mother, was assumed into heaven and participates in his heavenly glory. One of the themes in the depiction of the Virgin as queen is the Coronation of the Virgin, often built on the third phase of the Assumption of Mary in which, following her Assumption, she is crowned as the Queen of Heaven. Narrative pictures of the Coronation of the Virgin may often be distinguished from allegorical pictures of the Queen of Heaven by the appearance in them of events from the last days of the Virgin on Earth, such as the deathbed and the Apostles and friends weeping for her.

The earliest known Roman depiction of "Santa Maria Regina", depicting the Virgin Mary as a queen, dates to the 6th century and is found in the modest church of Santa Maria Antiqua ("ancient St. Mary") built in the 5th century in the Forum Romanum. Here the Virgin Mary is unequivocally depicted as an empress. As one of the earliest Roman Catholic Marian churches, this church was used by Pope John VII in the early 8th century as the see of the bishop of Rome. Also in the 8th century, the Second Council of Nicaea decreed that such pictures of Mary should be venerated.

The Virgin as queen was a recurring theme in many books composed in her honor in 13th century France. In the Speculum beatae Mariae she was at once queen of Heaven, where she was enthroned in the midst of angels, and queen of Earth, where she constantly manifested her power. The concept was carried over to art that decorated churches, e.g. the west porch of Chartres Cathedral and in the Porte Sainte-Anne at Notre Dame, Paris where she is seated in regal state, as well as in a window at Laon Cathedral.

In the early 16th century, Protestant reformers began to discourage Marian art, and some, like John Calvin and Zwingli, even encouraged its destruction. But after the Council of Trent in the mid-16th century confirmed the veneration of Marian paintings by Catholics, Mary was often painted as a Madonna with crown, surrounded by stars, standing on top of the world or the partly visible Moon. After the victory against the Turks at Lepanto, Mary is depicted as the Queen of Victory, sometimes wearing the crown of the Habsburg empire. National interpretations existed in France as well, where Jean Fouquet painted the Queen of Heaven in 1450 with the face of the mistress of King Charles VII. Statues and pictures of Mary were crowned by kings in Poland, France, Bavaria, Hungary and Austria, sometimes apparently using crowns previously worn by earthly monarchs – a surviving small crown presented by Margaret of York seems to have been that worn by her at her wedding to Charles the Bold in 1463. A recent coronation was that of the picture of the Salus Populi Romani in 1954 by Pius XII. The veneration of Mary as queen continues into the 21st century, but artistic expressions do not have a leading role as in previous times.

== See also ==
- Art in Roman Catholicism
- Roman Catholic Marian churches
