= Étienne Parrocel =

French painter (1696–1775)

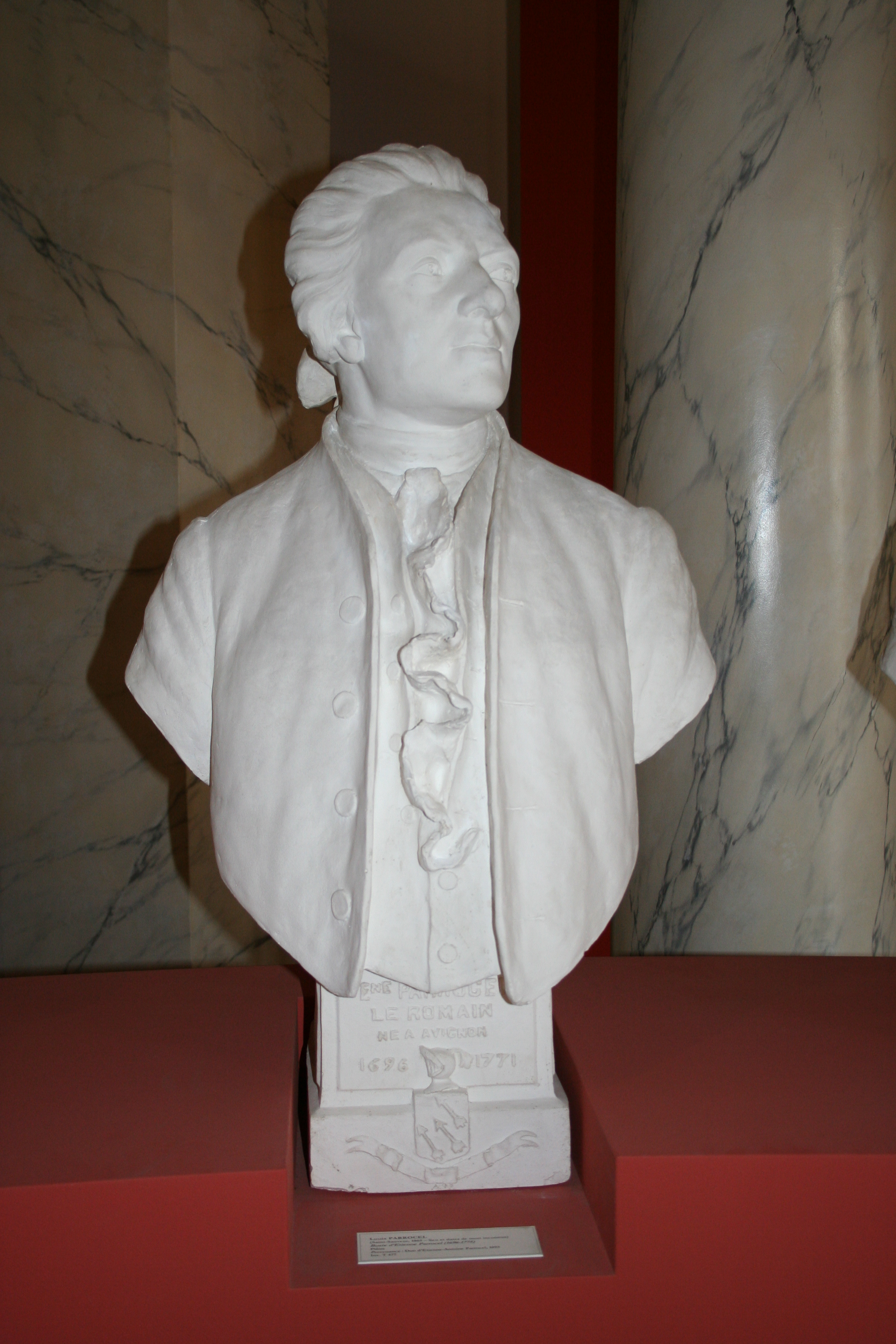
Musée Calvet-Etienne-Parrocel

Étienne Parrocel known as Le Romain (8 January 1696 – 26 August or 12 January 1775 or 1776) was a French painter working in Rome in the eighteenth century.

== Biography ==
He was born in Avignon. The son of Jacques-Ignace Parrocel and Jeanne Marie Périer, he belonged to a prolific dynasty of artists who generated fourteen painters in six generations.

He was a pupil of his Carthusian brother Gabriel Imbert (1666–1749). His uncle Pierre, who, after a period of study in France, in 1717 c., accompanied him to Rome to deepen his knowledge of painting with cousins Pierre Ignace and Joseph François. Étienne stayed in Italy in Rome and for this reason he was called Le Romain. He became a member of the National Academy of San Luca in 1734.

His first patron was Pierre Guérin de Tencin, bishop of Embrun, who in 1724 commissioned a painting representing the ceremony of his investiture, now lost.

From that time on, Étienne began to receive regular and numerous commissions, as he was skilled in both oil painting and fresco painting and became particularly well known for his works on religious themes, destined for churches in Rome and its surrounding area and churches in southern France.

His paintings with religious subjects include: Saint Gregory at the poor man's table (1729; Rome, San Gregorio a Ponte Quattro Capi), Nativity (1739, Rome, Basilica of Santa Maria in Trastevere), Trinity (1739, for the dome of Santa Maria Maddalena in Rome), two paintings for the altars of Carpentras Cathedral (1744; Saints Augustine and Bernard in situ and Saints Joseph and Dominic gone lost) and The Incredulity of Saint Thomas (1758; Spoleto, Municipal Picture Gallery), the painting for the high altar of the church of Santa Maria in Monticelli and the one for the high altar of the church of San Luigi di Francia, representing the apotheosis of Joan of Valois, founder of the order of the Annunziata. Nicolaus Billy made an engraving from the latter painting.

In addition to religious subjects, he also painted portraits such as that of Pierre Guérin de Tencin, engraved by Johann Georg Wille, and those of Cardinals Giovanni Battista Spinola, Melchior de Polignac, Pompeo Aldrovandi and Corsini.

In 1746 he painted an allegorical fresco having as subjects literature and philology represented by Apollo and Mercury for the library of Cardinal Neri Corsini in Palazzo Corsini in Rome.

According to Pilkington and de Boni, Étienne was born around 1720 and was also an engraver: he made etchings from his own drawings, in particular a Bacchanalian and also The Triumph of Mordecai by De Troy and The Triumph of Bacchus and Ariadne by Subleyras. Instead, according to Parrocel (pg.83) and the Grove Dictionary of Art, Étienne was born in 1696 and never made etchings.

He died in Rome in 1775 or 1776.

== Gallery ==
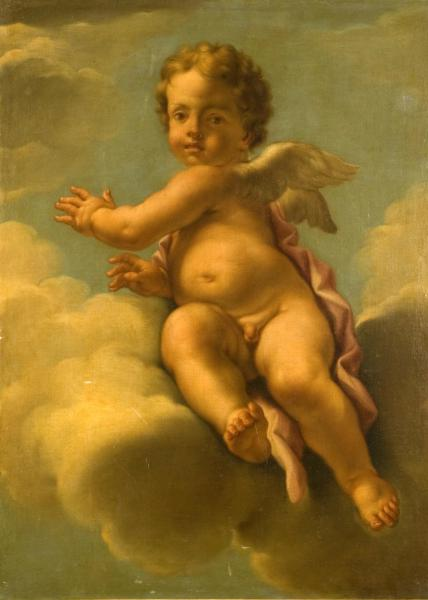

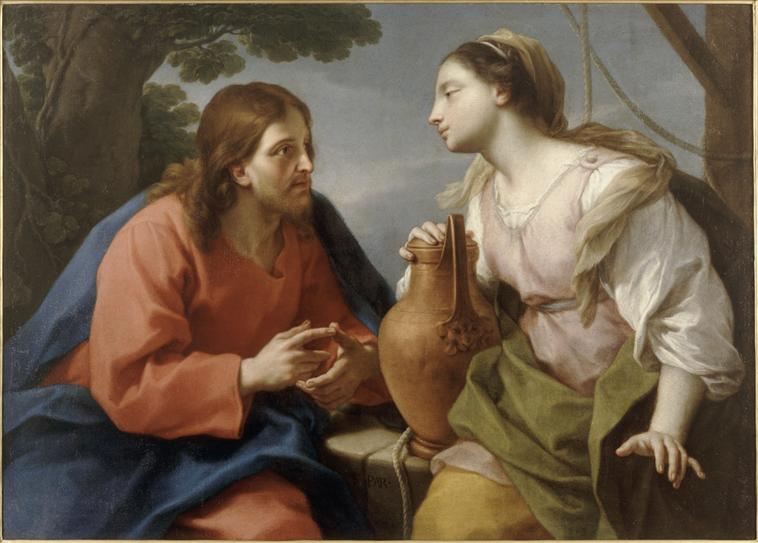
Jesus Samaritaine

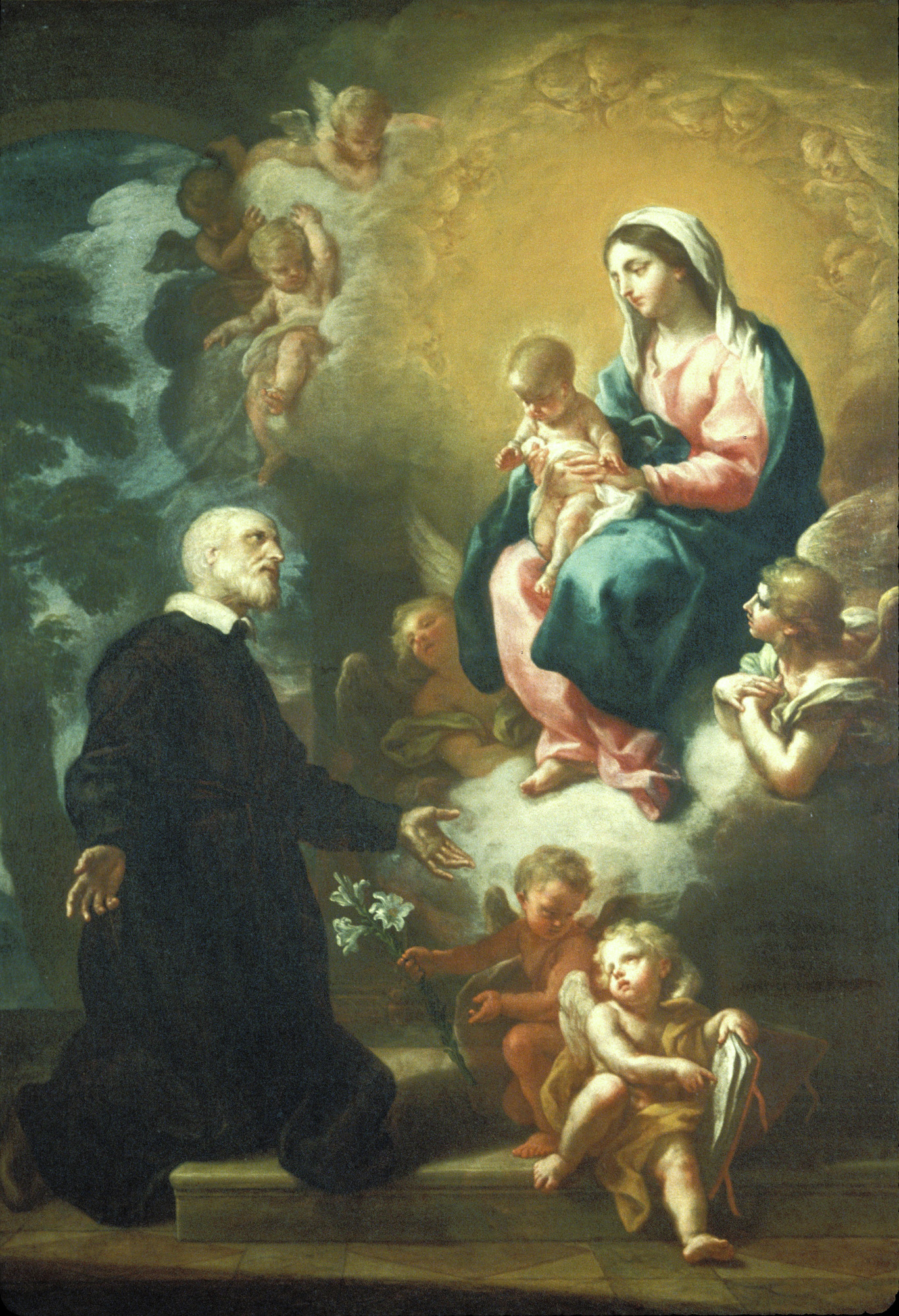
Apparition of the Virgin to Saint Philip

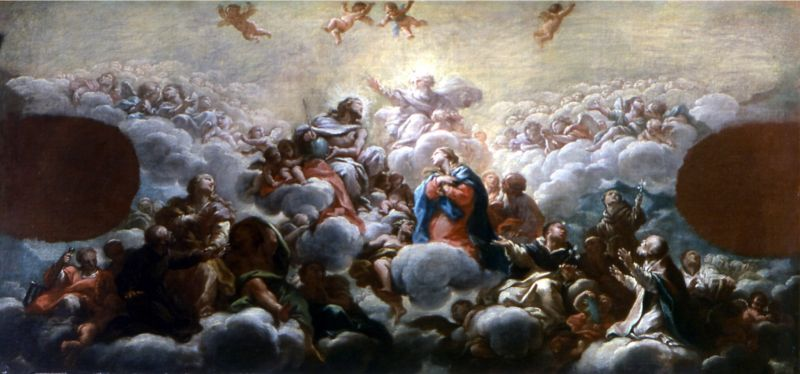

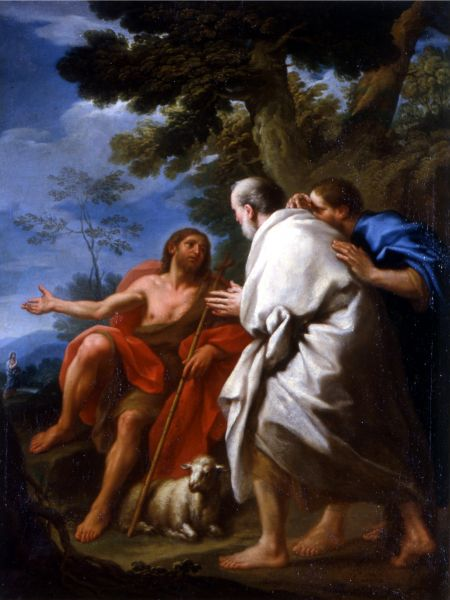
Saint Jean Baptiste

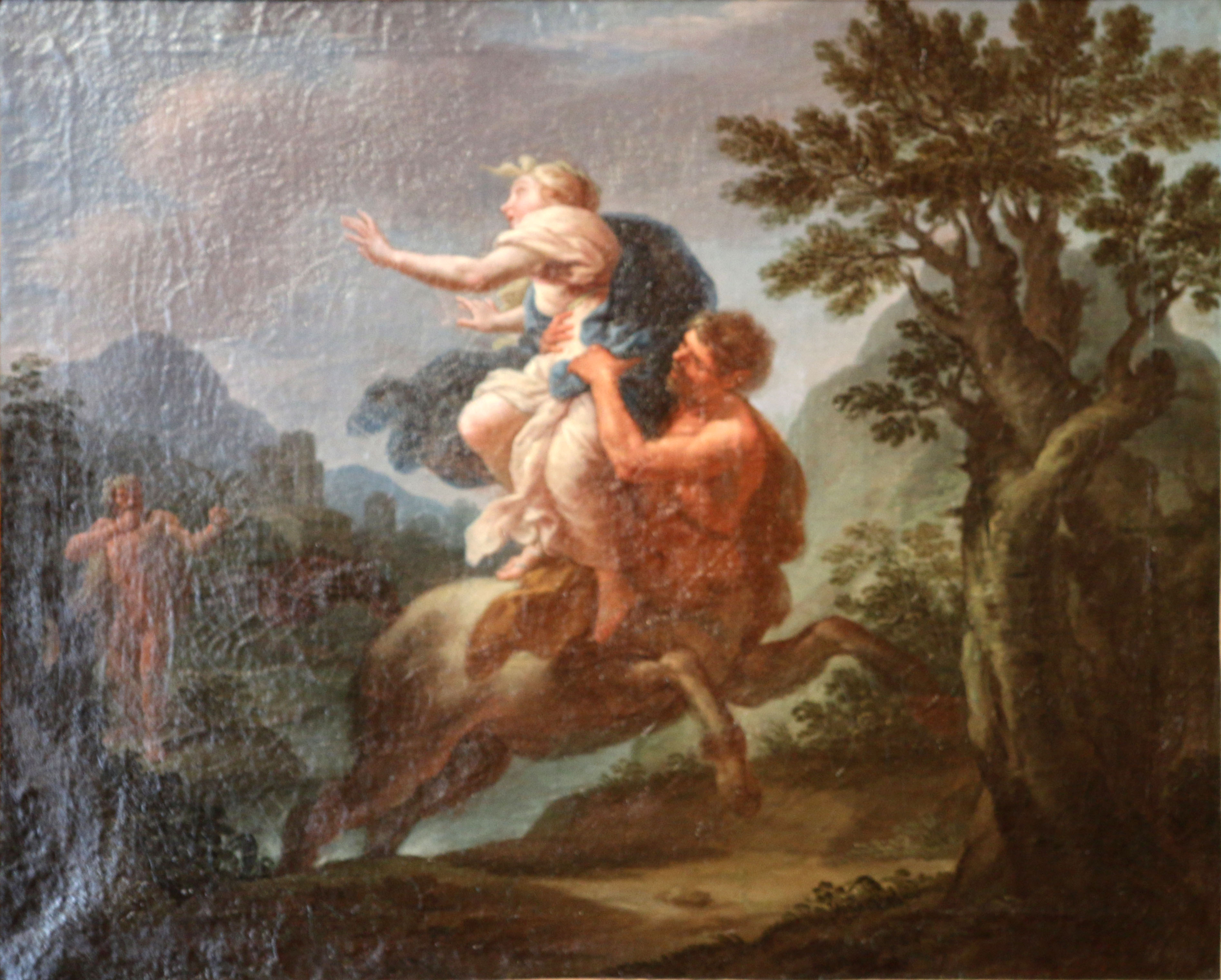
Déjanire

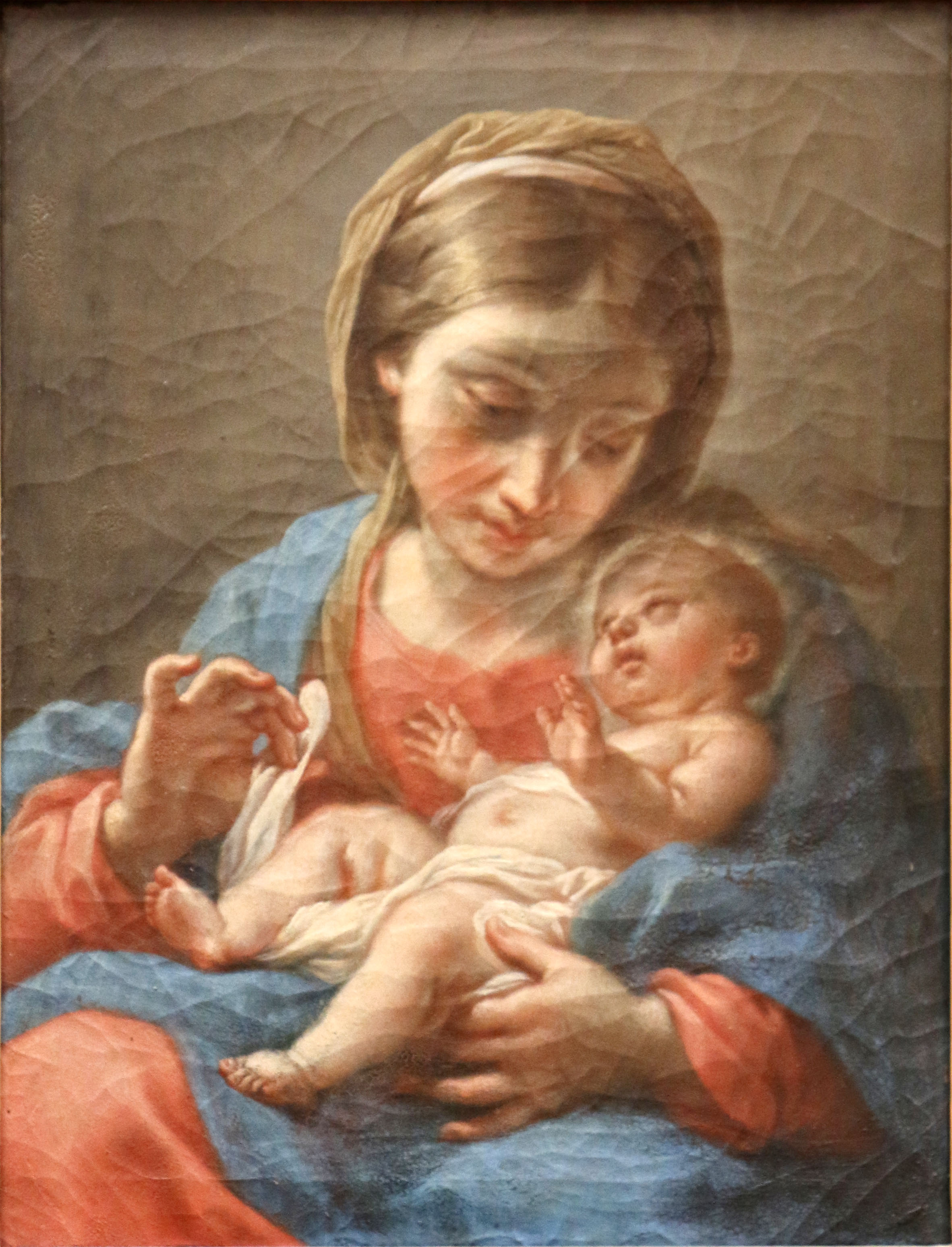
Vierge à l'Enfant

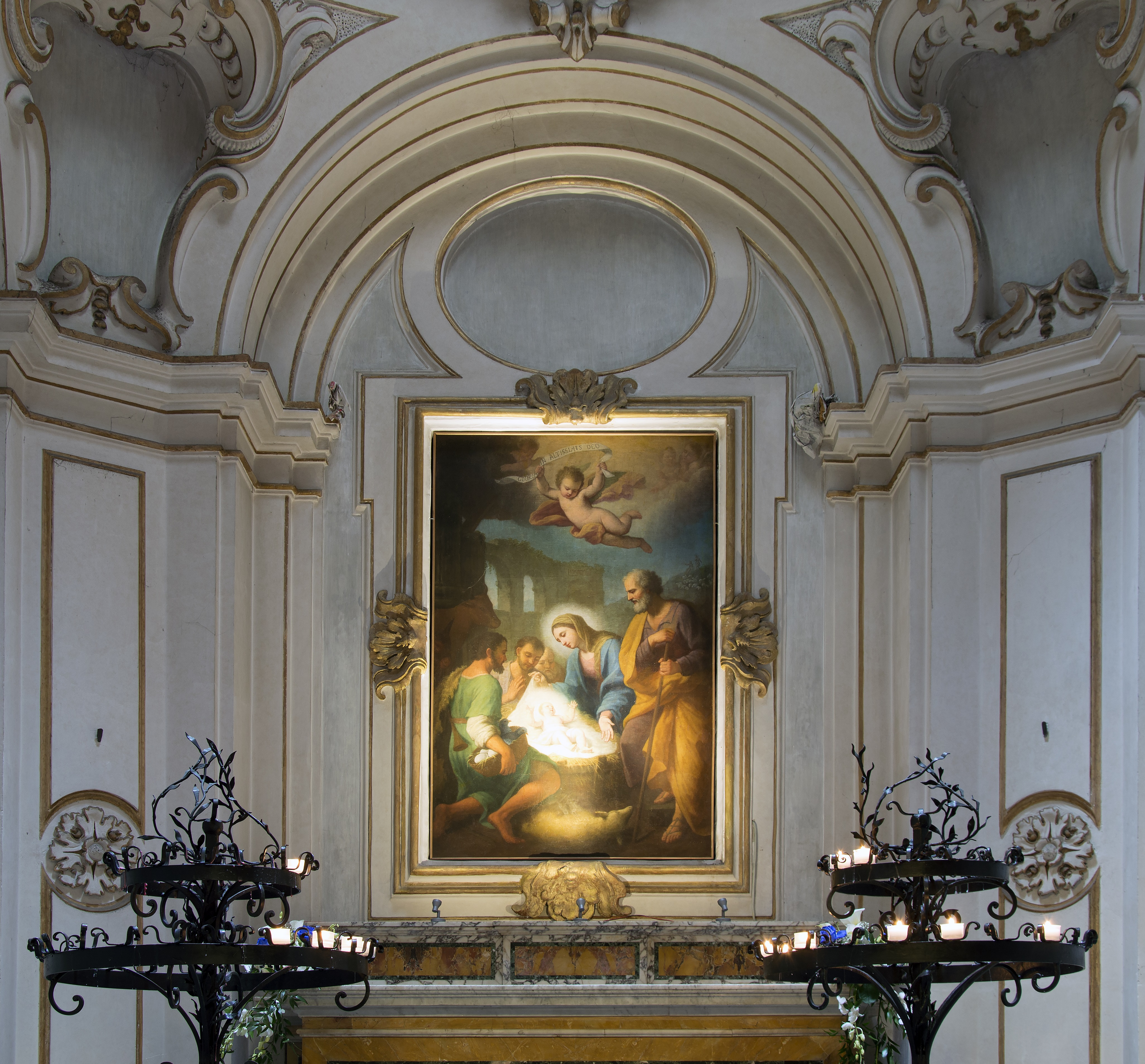
Santa Maria in Trastevere -Natività of Etienne Parrocel

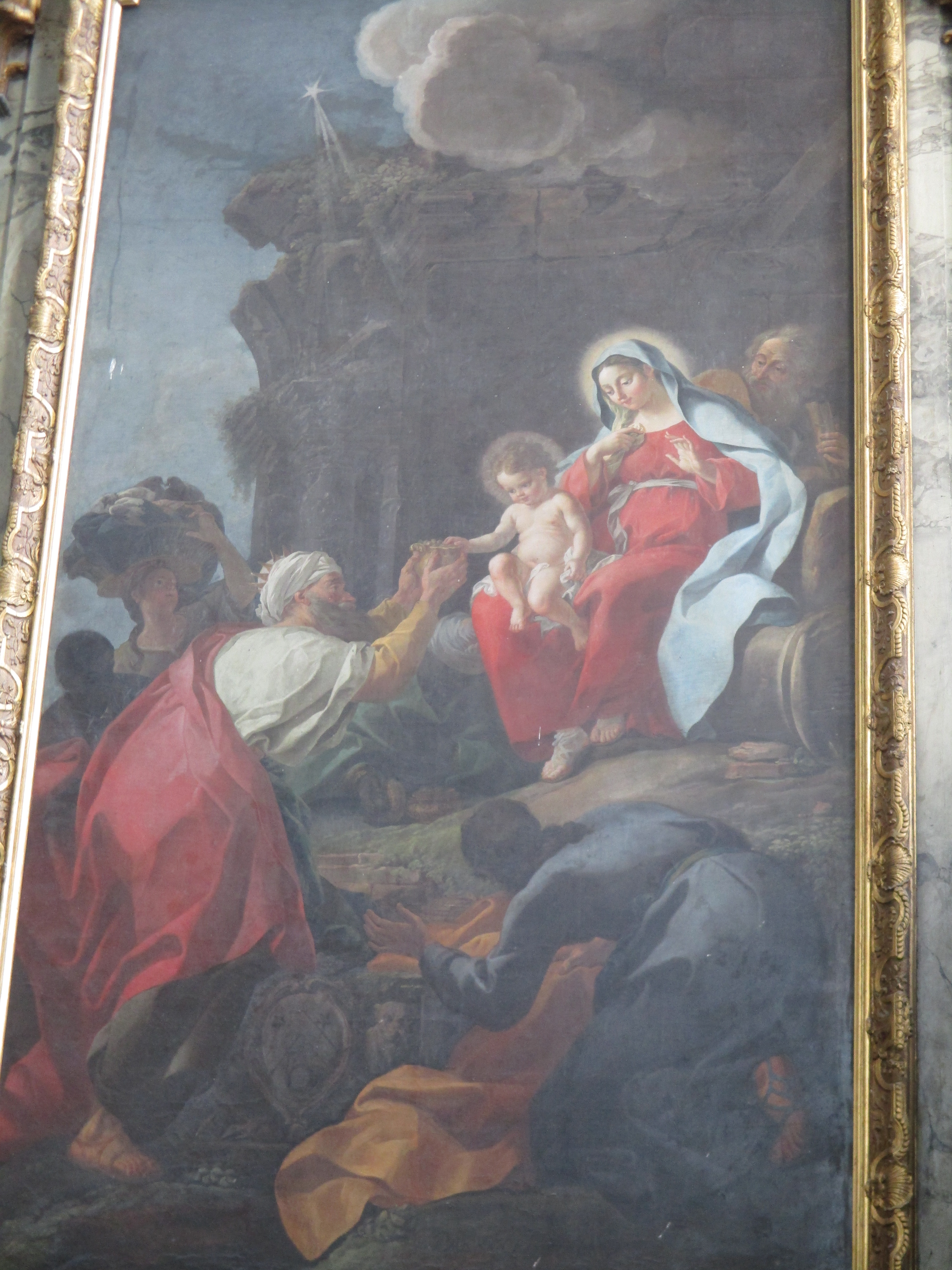
Étienne Parrocel, L'Adoration des mages (1749), chapelle de l'Aurore de la cathédrale Notre-Dame d'Amiens

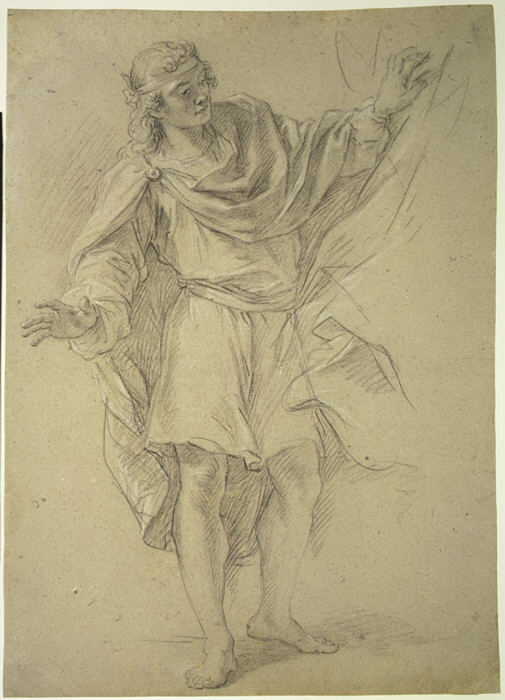
Man Pulling a Curtain Aside

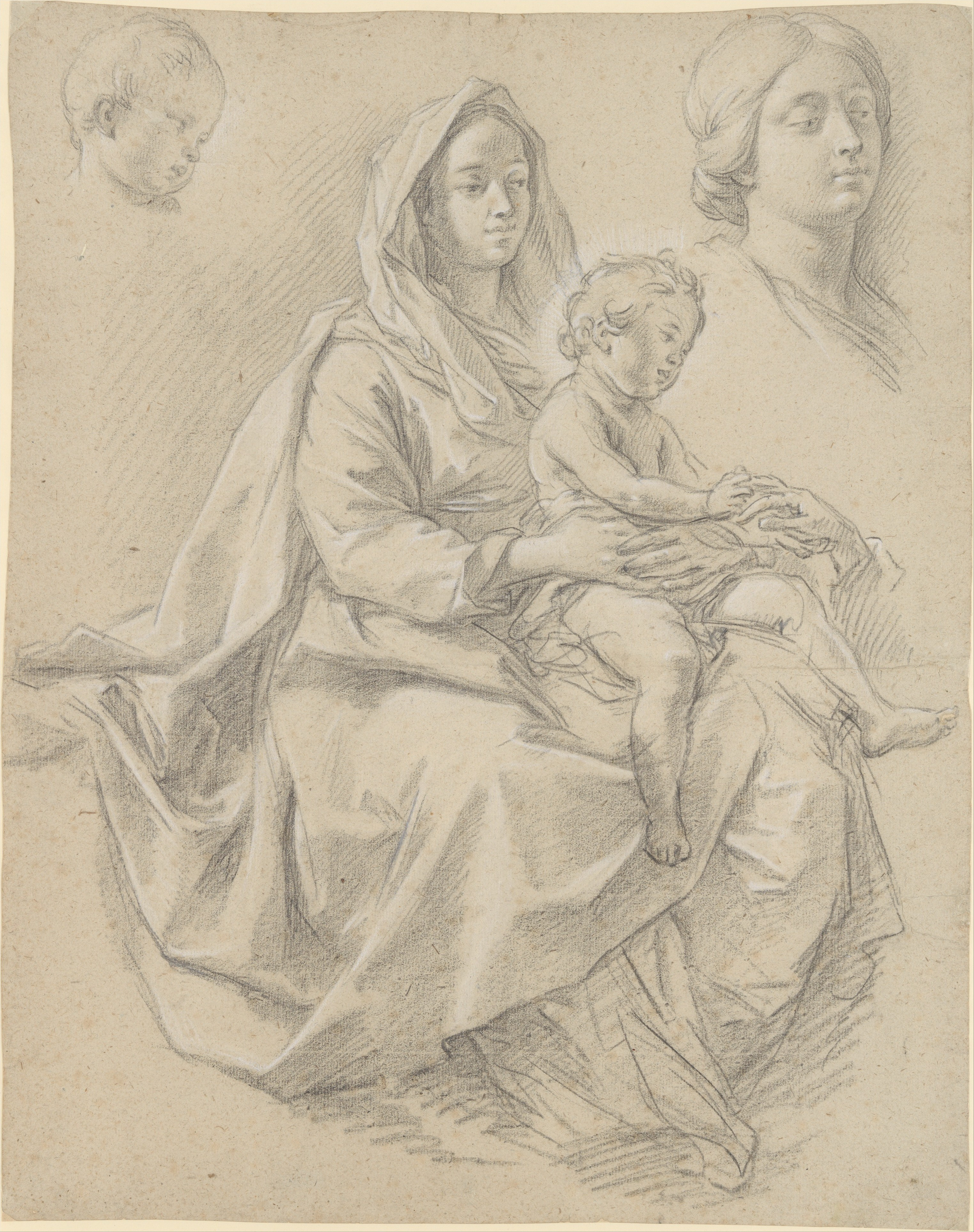
Seated Woman with a Child on her Lap

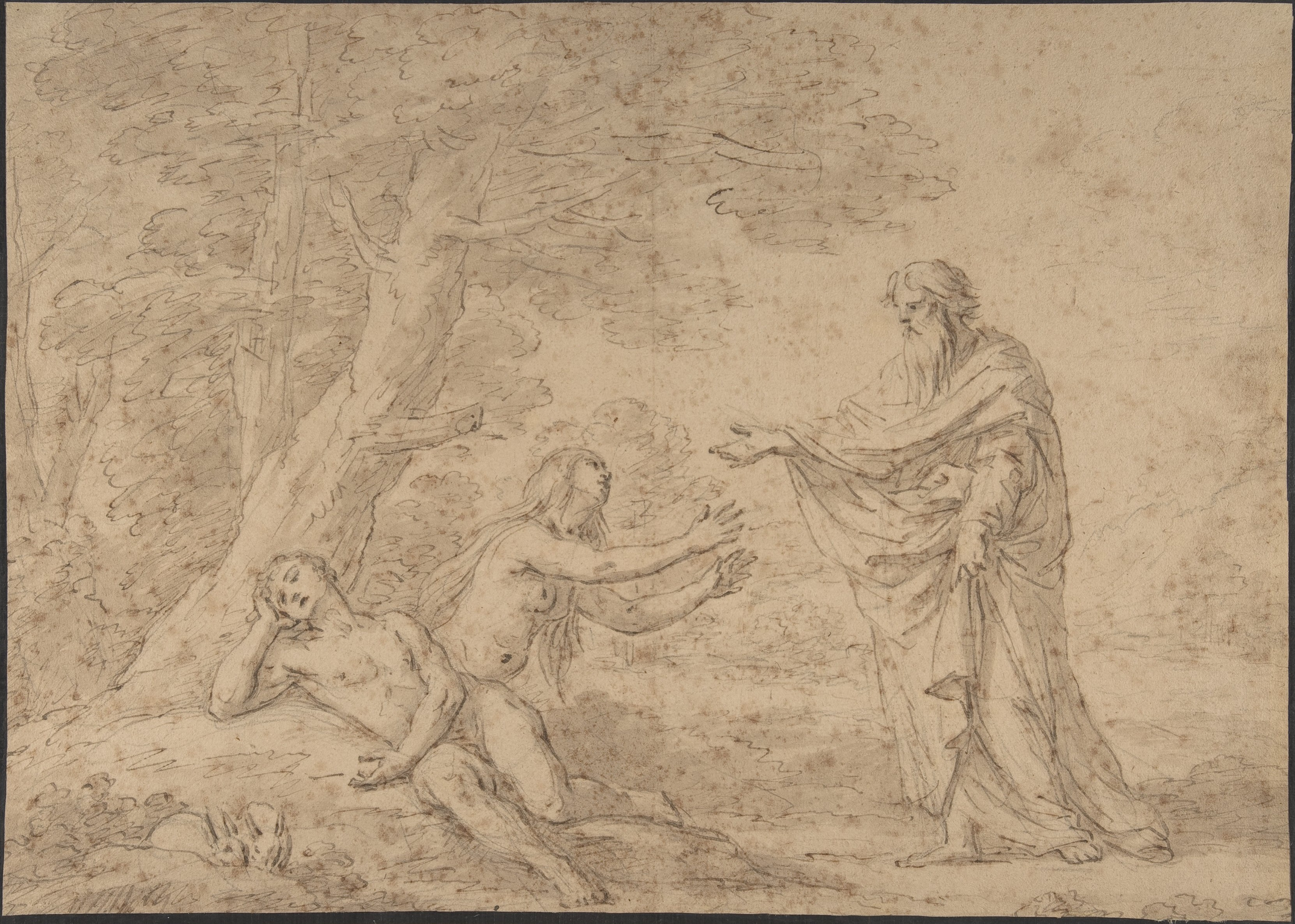
The Creation of Eve

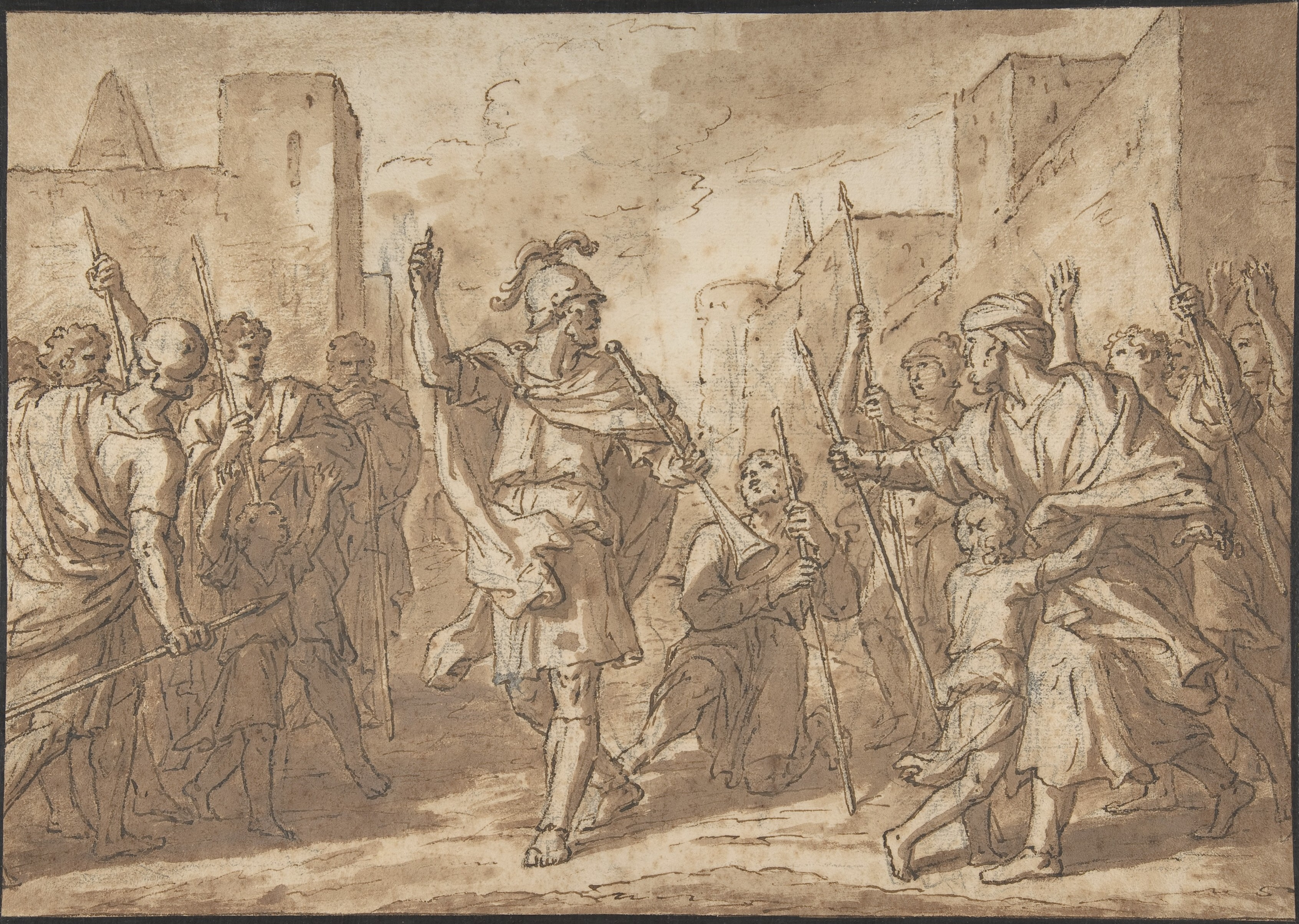
Gideon Gathering His Army, Scene from the Book of Judges

== List of Works ==
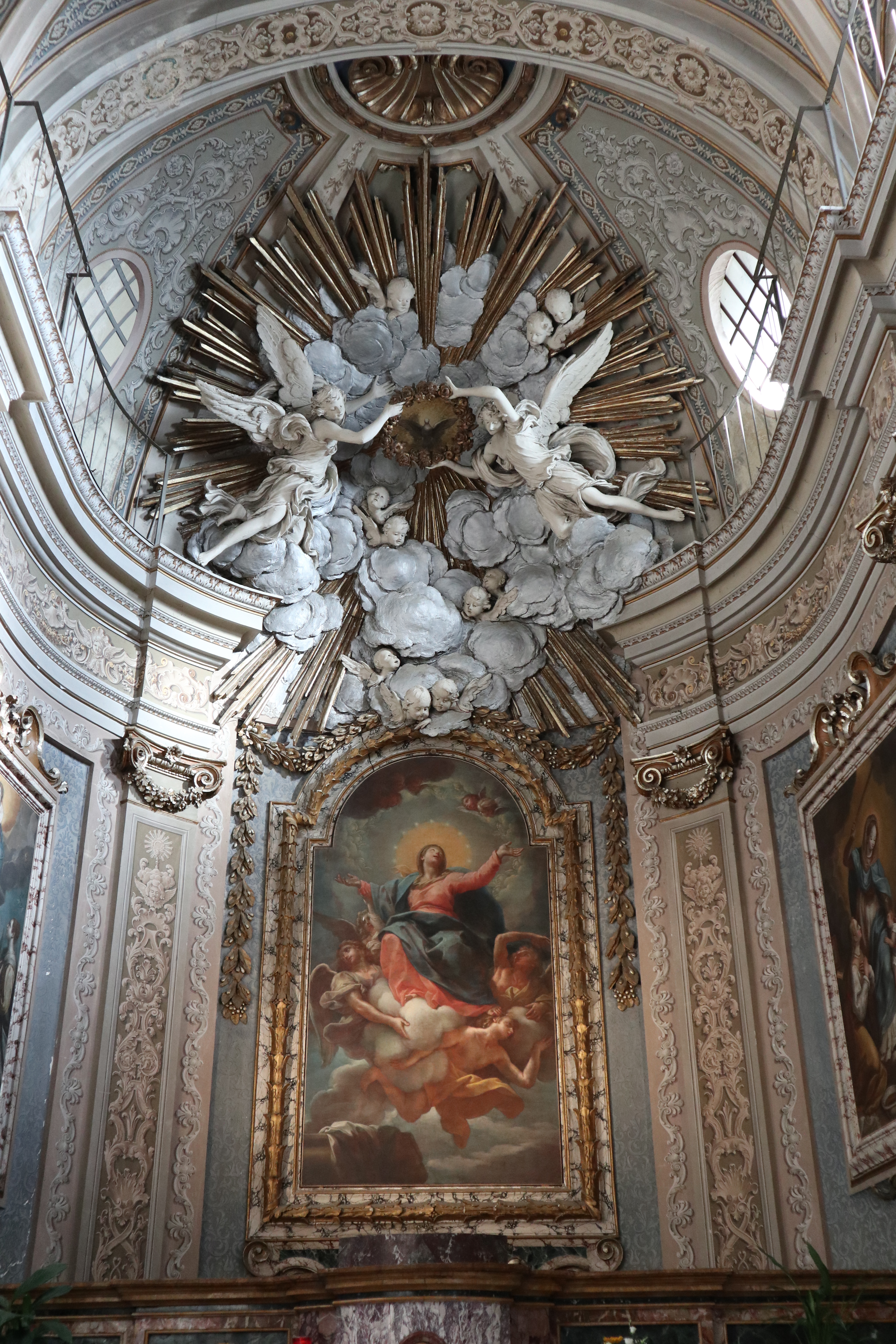
Virgin Mary Assumed into Heaven, Collegiate Church of Santa Maria Assunta in Filottrano

- The apotheosis of Saint Joan of Valois, founder of the order of the Annunziata, church of Saint Louis of France, Rome
- Saint Gregory at the poor man's table, Rome Saint Gregory at Ponte Quattro Capi, 1729
- Portrait of Pierre Guérin de Tencin
- Portrait of Cardinal Spinola
- Portrait of Cardinal de Polignac
- Portrait of Cardinal Aldrovandi
- Portrait of Cardinal Corsini
- Holy Family, Carpentras
- The Virgin and Child Jesus, Comtadin-Duplessis Museum, Carpentras, 1733
- Nativity, Basilica of Santa Maria in Trastevere, Rome, 1739
- Trinity, for the dome of Santa Maria Maddalena in Rome, 1739
- Saints Augustine and Bernard, Cathedral of Carpentras, 1744
- Saints Joseph and Dominic (lost), Cathedral of Carpentras, 1744
- The incredulity of San Tommaso, Spoleto, Pinacoteca comunale, 1758
- Allegory of literature and philology represented by Apollo and Mercury, Corsini Palace, Rome, 1746
- Vergine Maria Assunta in Cielo, Pala dell'altar maggiore della Collegiata di Santa Maria Assunta, Filottrano
- Pentecost, presbytery of the Collegiate Church of Santa Maria Assunta, Filottrano
- Descent of the Holy Spirit on Mary and the Apostles gathered in the Upper Room, presbytery of the Collegiate Church of Santa Maria Assunta, Filottrano
- The Virgin and Child Jesus and two Saints, 25 x 18 cm.
- The Holy Family and Saint Anthony of Padua, 53 x 39 cm, oil on canvas
- The Virgin and Child with St. Francis and St. Augustine, 35.5 x 22.5 cm
- The Supper at Emmaus, 20.7 x 35.7 cm, black and white chalk on paper
- Jesus and the Samaritan Woman
- The Virgin and Child give the rosary to Saint Dominic
- Study of five figures, black and white chalk, 54.2 x 40.4 cm, Paris, ENSBA (Ecole National Supérieuer de Beaux Arts)
- Atlas holding a yoke, black and white chalk, 41.5 x 28 cm, Paris, ENSBA (Ecole National Supérieuer de Beaux Arts)

== See also ==
- I Parrocel
- Pierre Parrocel

== Bibliography ==
- Etienne Parrocel, Annales de La Peinture, 2009
- Etienne Parrocel, Monographie des Parrocel: Essai, 1861
- Filippo De Boni, Biografia degli artisti, Venezia co' Tipi del Gondoliere, 1840, pag.752
- Matthew Pilkington, A general dictionary of painters: containing memoirs of the lives and works of the most eminent professors of the art of painting, vol. II, Londra, Thomas MacLean, 1824, pag.138
