= Joseph Parrocel =

French painter

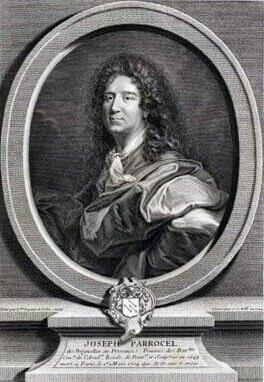
- Born: 3 October 1646; Brignoles
- Died: 1 March 1704 (aged 57); Paris
- Known for: Paintings of battle scenes
- Children: Charles Parrocel
- Relatives: Pierre Parrocel (nephew); Jacques-Ignace Parrocel (nephew); Étienne Parrocel (grandnephew)
- Patrons: Louis XIV

Joseph Parrocel (3 October 1646 – 1 March 1704) was a French Baroque painter, best known for his paintings and drawings of battle scenes.

He was born in Brignoles, into an artistic family that produced fourteen painters over six generations. His grandfather Georges Parrocel (1540 – c. 1614) (no surviving works) and his father Barthélemy Parrocel (1595–1660) were both painters. One badly restored painting of Bathélemy survives in the church of Saint-Sauveur in Brignoles, France. His brothers Jean Barthélemy Parrocel (1631–1653) (no surviving works) and Louis Parrocel (1634–1694) also became painters. He was soon noticed

He was only thirteen years old when his father died in 1660. His elder brother Louis, who was already established as a painter in the Languedoc, took him under his care and gave him a training as painter. Three years later he ran away from his brother's house to Marseille. His talent as a painter became soon noticed and he got a commission for a number of paintings with scenes of the life of Saint Anthony of Padua for the church Saint-Martin. But he only executed two of them. it is also possible that he painted them during his second stay in the Provence.

He left for Paris and stayed there for four years, perfecting his skills. He then returned to the Provence and continued his journey to Italy, where he would stay for eight years. In Rome he became the pupil of Jacques Courtois, a famous painter of battle scenes who was also known als "le Bourguignon" or "il Borgognone". He also studied the works of Salvator Rosa, an unorthodox proto-Romantic painter. Joseph Parrocel worked with him in his workshop and was thoroughly influenced by him, even if he gave his style later a more French touch.

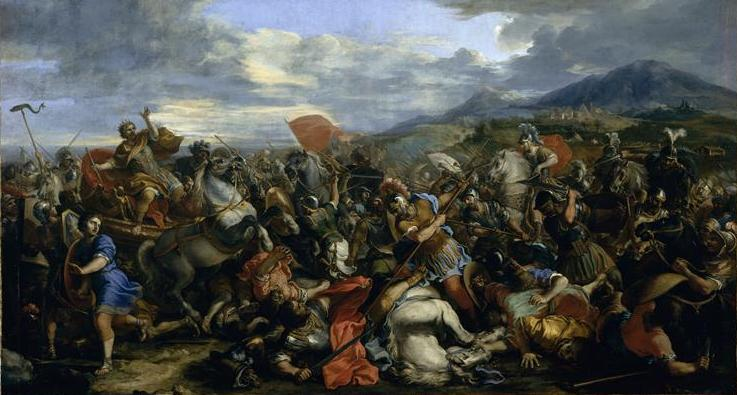
Alexander the Great defeats King Darius in the battle of Arbelles (c. 1687)

Parrocel then started a journey through Italy and finally arrived in Venice. He was planning to settle in this town but after eight brigands had attempted to murder him on the Rialto Bridge, he left Italy in disgust.

He settled in Paris in 1675 and earned himself a reputation. He was accepted as an elected member at the Académie Royale de Peinture et de Sculpture on 29 February 1676 and he became an academician on 14 November 1676 with his admission piece "Siege of Maastricht". In 1703 he became a councillor at the Academy. As a member of the Academy, he would obtain royal commissions. However, Charles Le Brun, who headed the Academy, refused his cooperation in the paintings of scenes of the campaigns of king Louis XIV, designed to become tapestries in the Gobelins manufactory. However the French Secretary of State for War, the Marquis de Louvois recognized the talent of Parrocel and gave him the commission to paint one of the dining halls of Les Invalides in Paris with scenes of conquest by Louis XIV. This was appreciated and led to further prestigious commissions to decorate the Château de Marly and the Palace of Versailles.

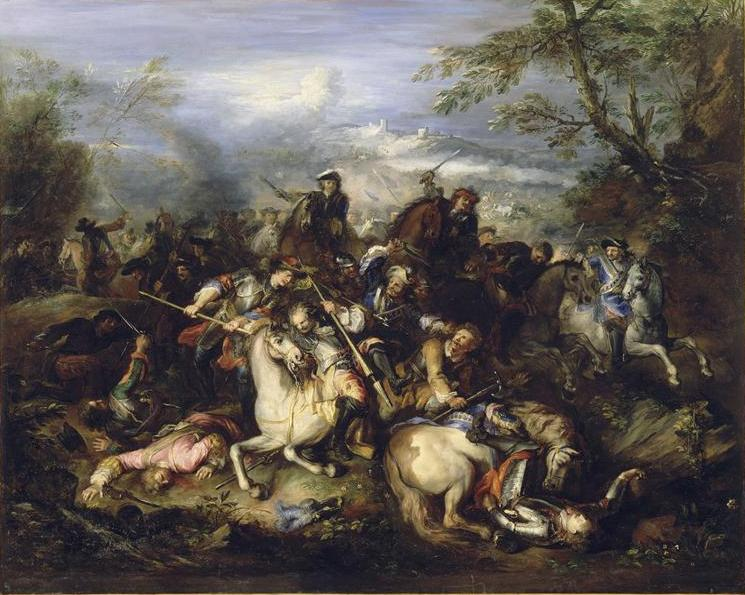
Battle of Leuze (c. 1691)

When Louvois died in 1691, Mansart became the chief architect of the king. Because Parrocel had not been paid for several paintings, he had obtained a warrant against Mansart, who was arrested in his coach. Through this action, he fell out of favour with Mansart, who sought vengeance for this affront at the first occasion. When Parrocel had finished the painting "Crossing of the Rhine" for the Palace of Versailles, Mansart wanted to remove it. However, the king was so pleased with this painting that he ordered it to be placed in the "Grand Salon du Conseil" in Versailles.

During his lifetime, Joseph Parrocel participated in only one exhibition, the Salon of 1699, with twelve paintings. He died, aged 57, in Paris.

He is best known for his heroic battle scenes but painted also landscapes, historical pieces and religious works, such as "The temptation of St. Peter in the desert" (1694). He also produced paintings for the church "Notre-Dame des Victoires", the Hôtel de Soubise and the Hôtel de Toulouse, all in Paris. In 1700 he painted "The Fair at Bezons", a precursor of the fêtes galantes of Antoine Watteau. He was also one of the first to paint hunting scenes.

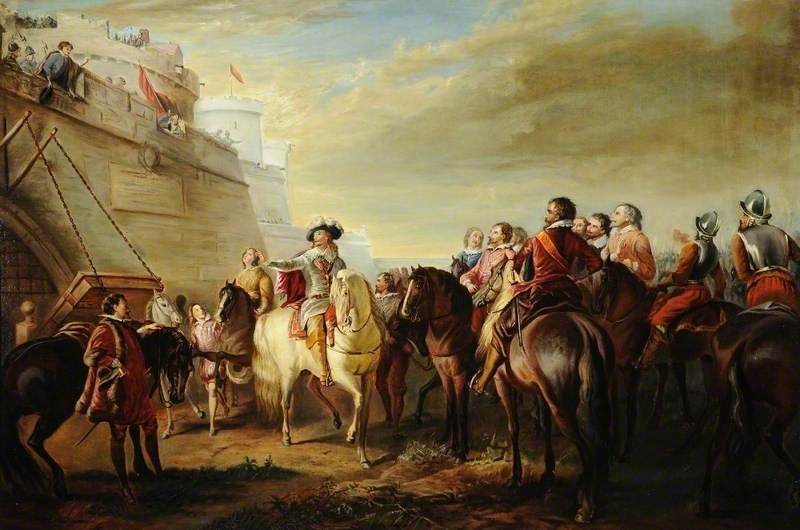
Charles I before Hull, after a work by Parrocel

His differed from his contemporary academician Adam Frans van der Meulen by being more original and vivid in his execution. He applied broad, nervous layers with dazzling movements, using intense colours.

During his lifetime he produced more than 90 prints engravings, many of which are in the Louvre, Paris. His works are exhibited in many French museums, but also abroad in Hannover and in Quebec (Laval University).

Joseph Parrocel apprenticed his two sons Jean Joseph (1690–1774), who became a draughtsman and engineer, and Charles (1688–1752), who also became a painter and engraver, his nephews Jacques-Ignace (1667–1722) and Pierre (1670–1739), who both became painters and engravers.

A number of his paintings are now suggested to be early works of his nephew Jacques-Ignace Parrocel (1667–1722).
