= Hermolaus of Macedon =

Page to Alexander the Great

Hermolaus of Macedon (Greek: Ἑρμόλαος) was a page to Alexander the Great in 327 BC, who was executed for planning regicide.

== Early life ==
The son of hipparch Sopolis of Macedon, Hermolaus was one of the Macedonian youths drawn from sons of the aristocracy who, according to a custom instituted by Philip II of Macedon, attended Alexander the Great as pages.

== Conspirator ==
It was during the residence of the king at Bactra in the spring of 327 BC, that a circumstance occurred which led him, in conjunction with some of his fellow pages, to form a conspiracy against the life of Alexander. Among the duties of the pages, who were in almost constant attendance on the king's person, was that of accompanying him when hunting, and it was one of these occasions that Hermolaus gave offence by slaying a wild boar without waiting to allow Alexander the first blow. Highly incensed at this breach of discipline, the king ordered him to be chastised with stripes, and further punished by being deprived of his horse.

Hermolaus, a lad of high spirit, already verging on manhood, could not brook this indignity: his resentment was inflamed by the exhortations of the philosopher Callisthenes, his former tutor, and by the sympathy of his most intimate friend and eromenos among his brother pages, Sostratus. Together the two youths eventually formed a scheme to assassinate the king while he slept, the duty of guarding his bed chamber devolving upon the different pages in rotation. They revealed their plan to four of their companions, and the secret was kept, though 32 days are said to have elapsed before they had an opportunity. But on the night, during which Antipater, one of their number, was to keep watch, Alexander happened to stay out all night drinking, possibly on the recommendation of a Syrian soothsayer. The next day the plot was divulged by another page who had been informed in the hope of enlisting him.

== Execution ==
Hermolaus and his accomplices were immediately arrested, and subsequently brought before the assembled Macedonians, by whom they were stoned to death after their trials. It appears, however, that they had been previously submitted to examination by torture, when, according to one account, they implicated Callisthenes also in their conspiracy; according to another, and on the whole a more probable one, they maintained that the plot had been wholly of their own devising. Some authors also represented Hermolaus as uttering before the assembled Macedonians a long harangue against the tyranny and injustice of Alexander.
