= Sostratos of Chios =

Ancient Greek sculptor

Sostratos of Chios (Ancient Greek: Σώστρατος) was an ancient Greek sculptor from the island of Chios, who was active around the middle of the 5th century BC.

== Biography ==
One of his artistic creations was a great bronze statue depicting Athena, which he made it in collaboration with Hypatodorus for the city of Alifeira in the ancient region of Arcadia (but in the modern Andritsaina-Krestena municipality in Elis regional unit of Greece). That statue is mentioned by Pausanias (Description of Greece, Book VIII, 8.26.7) and Polybius (Histories, IV, 4.78.5).

Greek historian Polybius writes: "... arrived at Alipheira. This city lies on a hill defended on all sides by precipices, the ascent of which is more than ten stades. It has a citadel on the summit of the whole hill and a bronze statue of Athena, remarkable for its size and beauty. The origin of this statue -from what motive and at whose expense it was made- is a subject of dispute among the natives themselves, as there is nothing to show definitely who dedicated it and why; but all agree as to the excellence of the workmanship, it being one of the most magnificent and artistic statues in existence, the work of Hecatodorus and Sostratus."
