= Charles Parrocel =

French painter

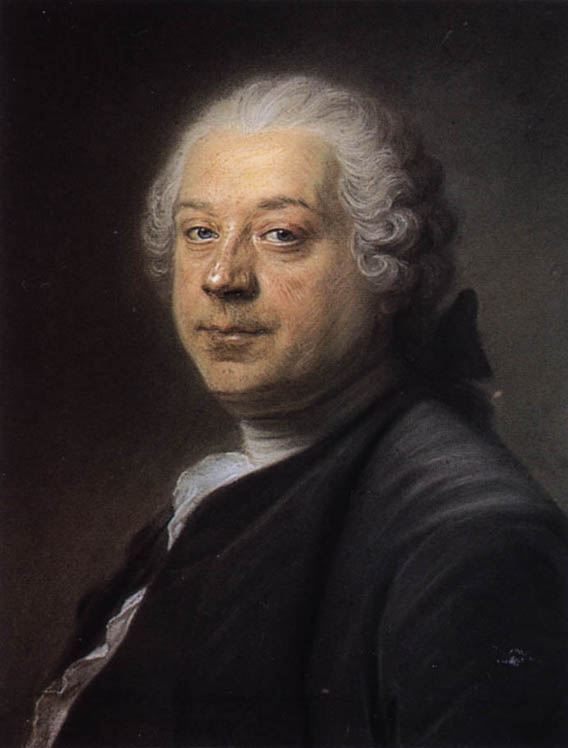
- Portrait by Maurice Quentin de La Tour
- Born: 6 May 1688; Paris
- Died: 24 May 1752 (aged 64); Paris
- Known for: Paintings and engravings
- Father: Joseph Parrocel

Charles Parrocel (6 May 1688 – 24 May 1752) was a French painter and engraver and a specialist in battle and hunt paintings.

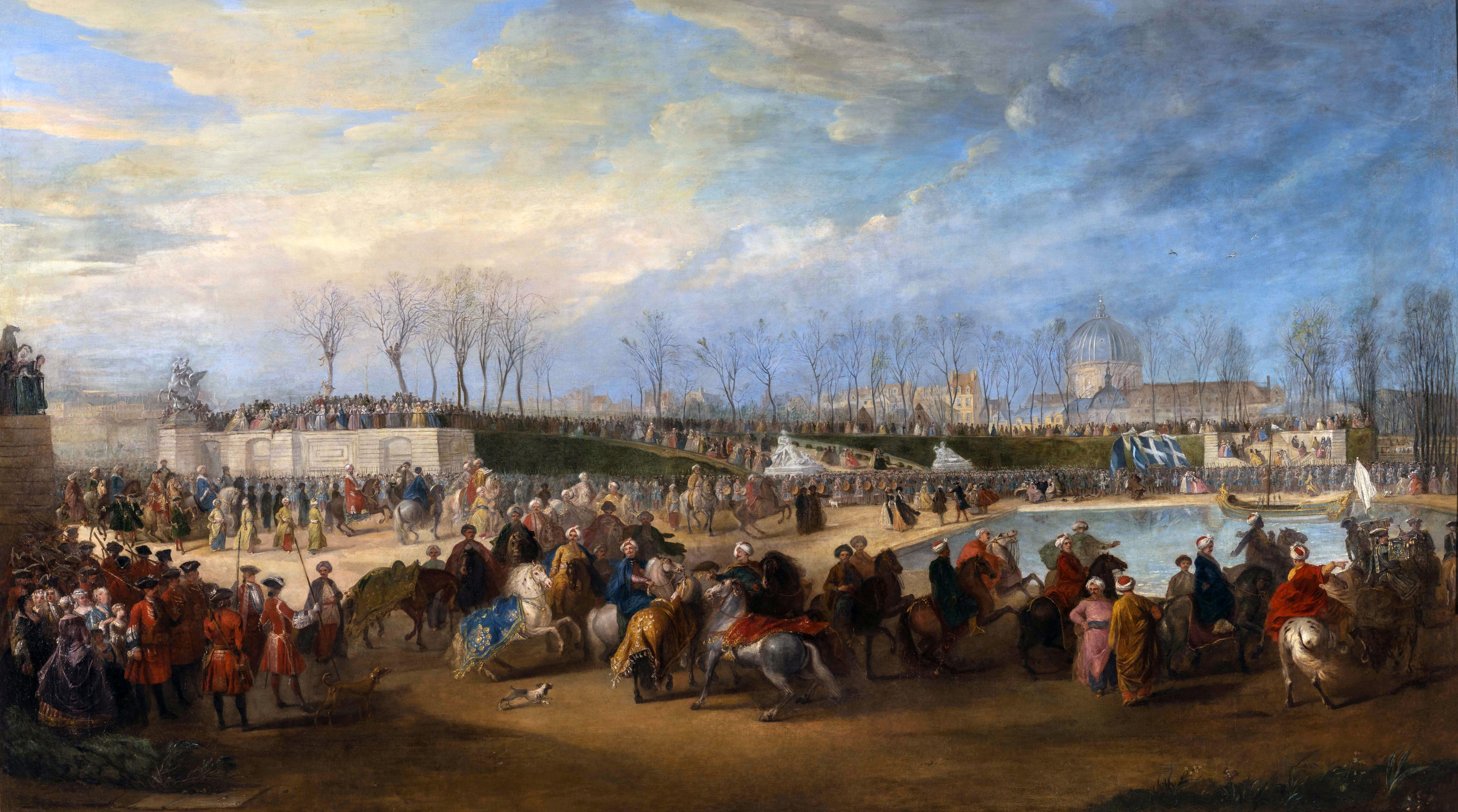
Mehemet Effendi arrives at the Tuileries on 21 March 1721. Charles Parrocel.

Parrocel was born in Paris, and studied under his father, Joseph Parrocel, until his death. Parrocel then became a pupil along with Bon Boullogne of Charles de La Fosse. In 1712 Parrocel moved to Italy, where he attended the Académie de France from 1713 to 1716 as an academy pensioner, or scholar. Returning to Paris in 1721 Parrocel was commissioned by King Louis XV to complete several paintings of the Turkish ambassador's trip to Paris. These paintings were later recreated as tapestries at the Gobelins manufactory in Paris. During that same year of 1721 Parrocel was also to become a member of the Académie Royale in Paris, eventually becoming a professor there in 1745. He died in Paris.
