= Sostratus of Macedon =

Sostratus (Ancient Greek: Σώστρατος, Sostratos), son of Amyntas, was an aristocratic Macedonian youth who served Alexander the Great.

Sostratus was implicated in the conspiracy of the pages against Alexander. As a result, he was executed by stoning with his lover Hermolaus.
