= Pierre Parrocel =

French painter

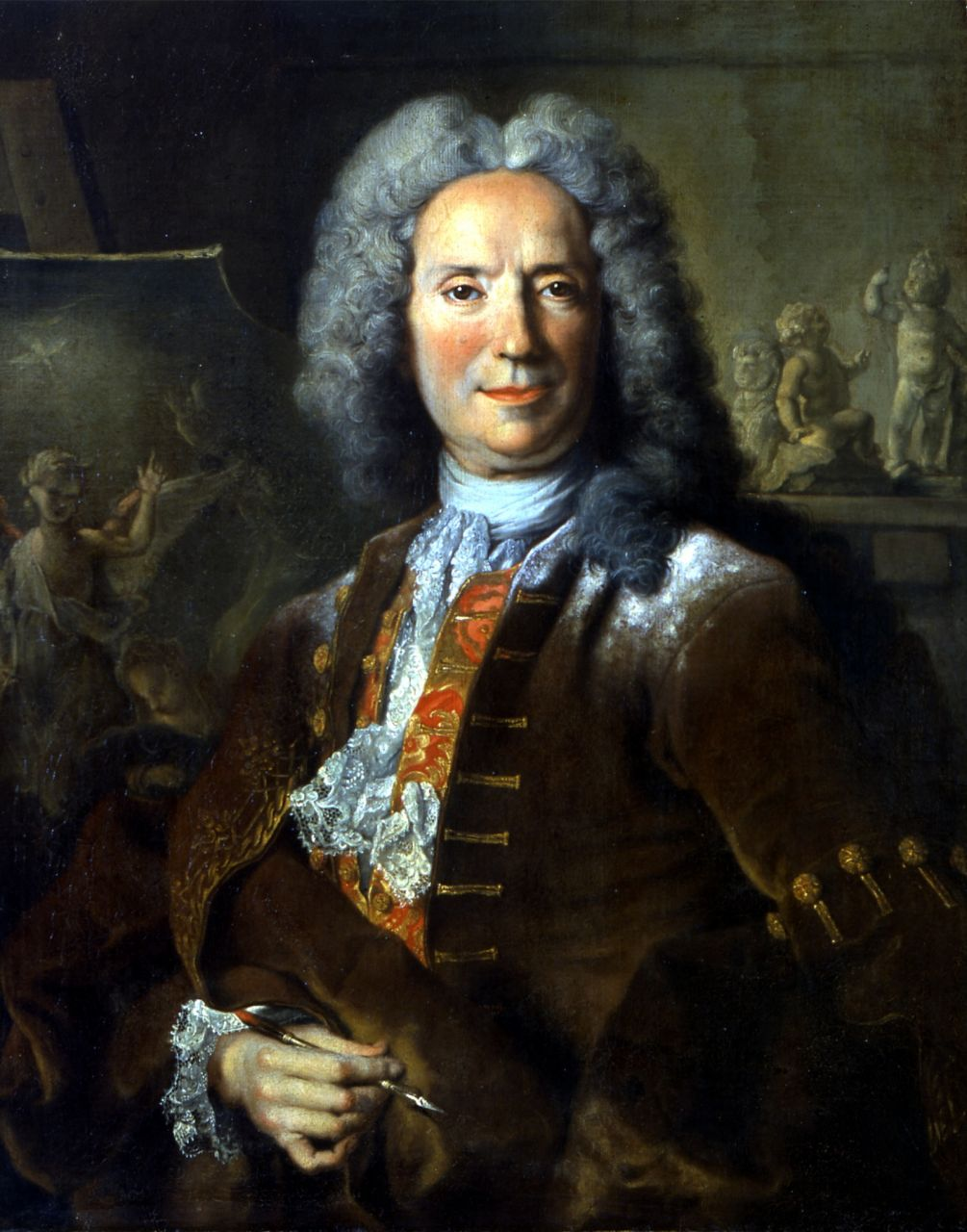
- Portrait by Nicolas de Largillière
- Born: 1664; Avignon, Papal States
- Died: 1739 (aged 74–75); Paris, France
- Known for: Paintings and engravings
- Relatives: Joseph Parrocel (uncle)

Pierre Parrocel (1664–1739) was a French painter of the late-Baroque period.

== Life ==
He was born in Avignon, Papal States, to a large family of artists, including his uncle Joseph Parrocel and his father, Louis Parrocel. He was first instructed by his uncle, and then trained with Carlo Maratti in Rome, and in 1730 became a member of the Accademia di San Luca there.

== Works ==
His principal work, as a painter, was in the gallery of the Hôtel de Noailles at St. Germain-en-Laye, where he represented the history of Tobit in thirteen pictures. He also painted a Coronation of the Virgin' in the church of St. Mary at Marseille. He also etched and engraved in a style analogous to that of A. Rivalz; but he was not equally successful with the graver. Of the fourteen etchings left by him, The Triumph of Aphrodite is perhaps the most noteworthy.
