= List of French painters =

This is a list of French painters sorted alphabetically and by the century in which the painter was most active.

== Alphabetically ==
=== A–C ===
- Pierre Abadie (1896–1972)
- Edmond Aman-Jean (1858–1936)
- Albert André (1869–1954)
- Mathuren Arthur Andrieu (1822–1896)
- Gaston Anglade (1854–1919)
- Charles Angrand (1854–1926)
- Alexandre Antigna (1817–1878)
- Joseph Apoux (1846–1910)
- Arcabas (1926–2018)
- Renée Aspe (1922–1969)
- Louise Astoud-Trolley (1817–1883)
- Etienne Aubry (1746–1781)
- Louis-François Aubry (1770–1850)
- Joseph Aved (1702–1766)
- Jean Bardin (1732–1809)
- Rex Barrat (1914–1974)
- Georges Barrière (1881–1944)
- Cécile Bart (born 1958)
- Jacques Barcat (1877–1955)
- Adrien Bas (1884–1925)
- Jean-François Batut (1828–1907)
- Jean René Bazaine (1904–2001)
- Frédéric Bazille (1841–1870)
- Geneviève Brossard de Beaulieu (fl. c. 1770–1815)
- Amar Ben Belgacem (1979–2010)
- Andrée Belle (1840–1901)
- Louis Émile Benassit (1833–1902)
- Pierre Berchet (1659–1720)
- Marcelle Bergerol (1901–1989)
- Antoine Berjon (1754–1843)
- André Beronneau (1886–1973)
- Louis Béroud (1852–1930)
- Jean-Baptiste Bertrand (1823–1887)
- Raymond Besse (1899–1969)
- Louis Bissinger (1899–1978)
- Sophie Blum-Lazarus (1867–1944)
- Pierre Bobot (1902–1974)
- Louis-Léopold Boilly (1761–1845)
- Jean-François Boisard (1762–1820)
- Maurice Boitel (1919–2007)
- Rosa Bonheur (1822–1899)
- Leon Bonnat (1833–1922)
- Jean de Botton (1898–1978)
- François Boucher (1703–1770)
- Henri Bouchet-Doumenq (1834–1884)
- Eugène Boudin (1824–1898)
- William Bouguereau (1825–1905)
- Gustave Boulanger (1824–1888)
- Charles Boulanger de Boisfremont (1773–1838)
- Valentin de Boulogne (1591–1632)
- Abel-Dominique Boyé (1864–1934)
- Louis Braquaval (1854–1919)
- Georges Braque (1882–1963)
- Ernest Breton (1812–1875)
- Gustave Brion (1824–1877)
- Pierre Brissaud (1885–1964)
- Pierre-Nicolas Brisset (1810–1890)
- François Brochet (1925–2001)
- Bernard Buffet (1928–1999)
- Étienne Buffet (1866–1948)
- Camille-Léopold Cabaillot-Lassalle (1839–1902)
- Louis-Nicolas Cabat (1812–1893)
- Gustave Caillebotte (1848–1894)
- Philippe Calandre (born 1964)
- Robert Campin (1378–1445)
- Albert-Ernest Carrier-Belleuse (1824–1887)
- Louis-Robert Carrier-Belleuse (1848–1913)
- Eugène Carrière (1849–1906)
- Clément Castelli (1870–1959)
- Paul Cézanne (1839–1906)
- Narcisse Chaillou (1835–1916)
- Charles-Édouard Chaise (1759-1798)
- Marguerite Émilie Chalgrin (1760–1794)
- Charles-Michel-Ange Challe (1718–1778)
- Jean-Baptiste de Champaigne (1631–1681)
- Philippe de Champaigne (1602–1674)
- Jérôme-François Chantereau (1710?—?)
- Jean Chardin (1643–1713)
- Jean Siméon Chardin (1699–1779)
- José Charlet (1916–1993)
- Fanny Charrin (1781–1854)
- Théodore Chassériau (1819–1856)
- Pierre Puvis de Chavannes (1824–1898)
- Wang Yan Cheng (born 1960)
- Jules Chéret (1839–1932)
- Aimée Julie Cheron (1821–c. 1890)
- Serge Chubine or Choubine, pseudonym of Sergei Aleksandrovich Zalshupin (1898 or 1900-1931)
- Antoine Chintreuil (1816–1873)
- Félix Auguste Clément (1826–1888)
- Charles-Louis Clérisseau (1721–1820)
- François Clouet (1515–1572)
- Jean Clouet (1480–1541)
- Léon Cogniet (1794–1880)
- Alphonse Colas (1818–1887)
- Émile Colinus (1884–1966)
- Nicolas Colombel (1646–1717)
- Charles-Fernand de Condamy (1855–1913)
- Lydia Corbett (born 1927)
- Roger de la Corbière (1893–1974)
- Frédéric Samuel Cordey (1854–1911)
- Karen Joubert Cordier (born 1954)
- Gilles Cormery (1950–1999)
- Fernand Cormon (1845–1924)
- Éric Corne (1957-)
- Jean-Baptiste-Camille Corot (1796–1875)
- Pierre Auguste Cot (1837–1883)
- Charles Cottet (1863–1925)
- Amédée Courbet (1827–1885)
- Gustave Courbet (1819–1877)
- Jean Cousin the Elder (1500–c. 1593)
- Jean Cousin the Younger (c. 1522–1595)
- Thomas Couture (1815–1879)
- Joseph Crepin (1875–1948)
- Louis-Philippe Crépin (1772–1851)
- Eugene Emmanuel Amaury Duval (1808–1885)
- Théodore Basset de Jolimont (1787–1854)

=== D–G ===
- Albert Dagnaux (1861–1933)
- Augustine Dallemagne (1821–1875)
- Charles-François Daubigny (1817–1878)
- Fernand Dauchot (1898–1982)
- Adrien Dauzats (1804–1868)
- Jacques-Louis David (1748–1825)
- Alexandre-Gabriel Decamps (1803–1860)
- Adolphe Déchenaud (1868–1926)
- Johan Stephan Decker (1784–1844)
- Edgar Degas (1834–1917)
- Alfred Dehodencq (1822–1882)
- Eugène Delacroix (1798–1863)
- Édouard Delaporte (1909–1983)
- Paul Delaroche (1797–1856)
- Jules-Élie Delaunay (1828–1891)
- Robert Delaunay (1885–1941)
- François-Alfred Delobbe (1835–1920)
- Marguerite Delorme (1876–1946)
- Maite Delteil (born 1933)
- Maurice Denis (1870–1943)
- André Derain (1880–1954)
- Jean-Baptiste-Henri Deshays (1729–1765)
- Henry d'Estienne (1872–1949)
- Édouard Detaille (1848–1912)
- Narcisse Virgilio Díaz (1807–1876)
- Étienne Dinet (1861–1929)
- Marcel Duchamp (1887–1968)
- Suzanne Duchamp (1889–1963)
- Joseph Ducreux (1735–1802)
- Georges Dufrénoy (1870–1943)
- Marie Duhem (1871–1918)
- Henri-Julien Dumont (1859–1921)
- Joseph Siffred Duplessis (1725–1802)
- François-Léonard Dupont-Watteau (1756–1824)
- Jules Dupré (1811–1889)
- Jean Dupuy (1925–2021)
- Marcel Dyf (1899–1985)
- Pierre Ernou (1685–1739)
- Charles Eschard (1748–1810)
- Bracha L. Ettinger (born 1948)
- Maxime Faivre (1856-1941)
- Henri Fantin-Latour (1836–1904)
- Auguste Feyen-Perrin (1826–1888)
- Clara Filleul (1822–1878)
- Hélène Feillet (1812–1889)
- Jean Fernand (born 1948)
- Charles Filiger (1863–1928)
- Rosalie Filleul (1752–1794)
- Jean-Hippolyte Flandrin (1809–1864)
- Camille Flers (1802–1868)
- René Fontayne (1891–1952)
- Jean Fouquet (1425–1481)
- Jean-Honoré Fragonard (1732–1806)
- Yitzhak Frenkel (1899–1981)
- Pierre Édouard Frère (1819–1886)
- Charles-Théodore Frère (1814–1886)
- Émile Friant (1863–1932)
- Eugène Fromentin (1820–1876)
- Pierre Gandon (1899–1990)
- Paul Gauguin (1848–1903)
- François Gérard (1770–1837)
- Théodore Géricault (1791–1824)
- Jean-Léon Gérôme (1824–1904)
- Félix-Henri Giacomotti (1828–1909)
- René Gillotin (1814–1861)
- Georges Gimel (1898–1962)
- Charles Léon Godeby (1866–1952)
- Alain Godon (born 1964)
- Eugène Goyet (1798–1857)
- Zoé Goyet (died 1869)
- Jean-Baptiste Goyet (1779–1854)
- Jean-Pierre Granger (1779–1840)
- Jean-Baptiste Greuze (1725–1805)
- Antoine-Jean Gros (1771–1835)
- Gabriel Guay (1848–1923)
- Anne Guéret (1760–1805)
- François Guiguet (1860–1937)
- Armand Guillaumin (1841–1927)
- Alvaro Guillot (1931–2010)

=== H–M ===
- Ahmed Hajeri (born 1948)
- Fulchran-Jean Harriet (1778–1805)
- T'ang Haywen (1927–1991)
- Jeanne-Mathilde Herbelin (1818–1904)
- I.J. Berthe Hess (1925–1996)
- René Charles Edmond His (1877–1960)
- Anne Marguerite Hyde de Neuville (1771–1849)
- Jean Auguste Dominique Ingres (1780–1867)
- Étienne Jeaurat (1699–1789)
- Jeanne Jégou-Cadart
- Henri de Jordan (1944–1996)
- Jean Jouvenet (1644–1717)
- Victor Koulbak (born 1946)
- Georges Lacombe (1868–1916)
- Charles Lacoste (1870-1959)
- Pierre Laffillé (1938–2011)
- Louis Lafitte (1770–1828)
- Antonio de La Gándara (1861–1917)
- Pierre Lamalattie (born 1956)
- Elisa de Lamartine (1790–1863)
- Espérance Langlois (1805–1864)
- Eustache-Hyacinthe Langlois (1777–1837)
- Jean-Charles Langlois (1789–1870)
- Polyclès Langlois (1813–1872)
- Langlois de Sézanne (1757–1845)
- François Lanzi (1916–1988)
- Edmond-Édouard Lapeyre (1880–1960)
- Gaston La Touche (1854–1913)
- Alfred Latour (1888–1964)
- Georges de La Tour (1593–1652)
- Joseph Latour (1806–1863)
- Jean-Paul Laurens (1838–1921)
- Jules Laurens (1825–1901)
- Andrée Lavieille (1887–1960)
- Eugène Lavieille (1820–1889)
- Marie Adrien Lavieille (1852–1911)
- Charles Lebayle (1856–1898)
- Charles Le Brun (1619–1690)
- Claude Lefebvre (1633–1675)
- Fernand Léger (1881–1955)
- Amélie Legrand of Saint-Aubin (1797–1878)
- Anne-Louise Le Jeuneux (died 1794)
- Le Nain brothers (c. 1599–1677)
- Louis Le Nain (1593–1648)
- Charles-Amable Lenoir (1860–1926)
- Jean Paul Leon (born 1955)
- Eugène Lepoittevin (1806–1870)
- Xavier Leprince (1799–1826)
- Alfred Lesbros (1873–1940)
- Eustache Lesueur (1617–1655)
- Pierre Le Tellier (1614–1702)
- Louis Levacher (1934–1983)
- Jacques Linard (1597–1645)
- Fleury Linossier (born 1902)
- Louis-Anselme Longa (1809–1869)
- Inès Longevial (born 1990)
- Claudine Loquen (born 1965)
- Louis Michel van Loo (1707–1771)
- Évariste Vital Luminais (1821–1896)
- Richard Maguet (1896–1940)
- Aristide Maillol (1861–1944)
- André Maire (1898–1984)
- Jacques Majorelle (1886–1962)
- Henri Malançon (1876–1960)
- Henri Malançon (1876–1960)
- Eugène de Malbos (1811–1858)
- Vincent Manago (1880–1936)
- Édouard Manet (1832–1883)
- Adrien Manglard (1695–1760)
- Pierre Marcel-Béronneau (1869–1937)
- Prosper Marilhat (1811–1847)
- Paul Marny (1829–1914)
- Henri Marret (1878–1964)
- Olivier Masmonteil (born 1973)
- Henri Matisse (1869–1954)
- Théo Mercier (born 1984)
- Pierre-Charles Le Mettay (1726–1759)
- Pierre Émile Metzmacher (1842–1916)
- Pierre Mignard (1612–1695)
- Ksenia Milicevic (born 1942)
- Jean-François Millet (1814–1875)
- Maurice Moisset (1860–1946)
- Benoît-Hermogaste Molin (1810–1894)
- Alphonse Monchablon (1835–1907)
- Jan Monchablon (1854–1904)
- Claude Monet (1840–1926)
- Jules Monge (1855–1934)
- François-André Vincent (1746–1816)
- Nicolas-André Monsiau (1754–1837)
- Gustave Moreau (1826–1898)
- Berthe Morisot (1841–1895)
- Zareh Moskofian (1898–1987)
- Henri-Paul Motte (1846–1922)

=== N–R ===
- Nasty (graffiti) (born 1975)
- Louis Nattero (1870–1915)
- Alfred-Arthur Brunel de Neuville (1852–1941)
- Alphonse-Marie-Adolphe de Neuville (1836–1885)
- Virgilije Nevjestić (1935–2009)
- Joseph de La Nézière (1873–1944)
- Jean Nicolle (1610–c. 1650)
- Boris O'Klein (1893–1985)
- Jean-Baptiste Olive (1848–1936)
- Jean-Baptiste Oudry (1686–1755)
- Milena Palakarkina (born 1959)
- Gen Paul (1895–1975)
- Fernand Pelez (1843–1913)
- Jacques Pellegrin (1944–2021)
- Albert Joseph Pénot (1862–1930)
- Edmond Marie Petitjean (1844–1925)
- Hippolyte Petitjean (1854–1929)
- Alexis Peyrotte (1699–1769)
- Francis Picabia (1879–1953)
- Charles Picart Le Doux (1881–1959)
- François-Édouard Picot (1786–1868)
- Henri-Pierre Picou (1824–1895)
- Patrick Pietropoli (born 1953)
- Henri Pinta (1856–1944)
- Camille Pissarro (1830–1903)
- Claude Plessier (born 1946)
- Nicolas de Poilly the Younger (1675–1747)
- Nicolas Poussin (1594–1665)
- Auguste Prévot-Valéri (1857–1930)
- André Prévot-Valéri (1890–1959)
- Pierre Puvis de Chavannes (1824–1898)
- Jean Puy (1876–1960)
- Denis Prieur (born 1957)
- Léon Printemps (1871–1945)
- Quentin de La Tour (1704–1788)
- Yehiel Rabinowitz (born 1939)
- Alexandre Rachmiel (1835–1918)
- Odilon Redon (1840–1916)
- Jean-Baptiste Regnault (1754–1829)
- Pierre-Auguste Renoir (1841–1919)
- Charles-Caïus Renoux (1795–1846)
- Eustache Restout (1655–1743)
- Jacques Restout (1650–1701)
- Marc Restout (1616–1684)
- Thomas Restout (1671–1754)
- Philippe Richard (born 1962)
- Raymond Rochette (1906–1993)
- Jeff Roland (born 1969)
- Bernard Rosenblum (1927–2007)
- Édouard Rosset-Granger (1853–1934)
- Georges Rouault (1871–1958)
- Jean Rouppert (1887–1979)
- Henri Rousseau (1844–1910)
- Théodore Rousseau (1812–1867)
- Monique de Roux (born 1946)
- Ferdinand Roybet (1840–1920)
- Henri Royer (1869–1938)

=== S–Z ===
- Fernande Sadler (1869–1949)
- Niki de Saint Phalle (1930–2002)
- Lucienne de Saint-Mart (1866–1953)
- Nicola Rosini Di Santi (born 1959)
- Maurice Savin (1894–1973)
- Jean-Jacques Scherrer (1855–1916)
- Franz Schrader (1844–1924)
- Théophile Schuler (1821–1878)
- René Schützenberger (1860–1916)
- Hippolyte Sebron (1801–1879)
- Jean Seignemartin (1848–1875)
- Jean Pierre Serrier (1934–1989)
- Henri Sert (1938–1964)
- Georges Seurat (1859–1891)
- Ibrahim Shahda (1929–1991)
- Paul Sibra (1889–1951)
- Sotiris René Sidiropoulos (born 1977)
- Paul Signac (1863–1935)
- Pierre Soulages (1919–2022)
- Nicolas de Staël (1914–1955)
- Jacques Stella (1596–1657)
- Michel Suret-Canale (born 1957)
- Alfred Swieykowski (1869–1953)
- Tancrède Synave (1870–1936)
- Octave Tassaert (1800–1874)
- Louis Tauzin (1842–1915)
- Georges William Thornley (1857–1935)
- James Tissot (1836–1902)
- François Topino-Lebrun (1764–1801)
- Victor Tortez (1843–1890)
- Édouard Toudouze (1848–1907)
- Henri de Toulouse-Lautrec (1864–1901)
- Anthelme Trimolet (1798–1866)
- Constant Troyon (1810–1865)
- Marie-Renée Ucciani (1883–1963)
- Maurice Utrillo (1883–1955)
- Suzanne Valadon (1865–1938)
- Pierre Adolphe Valette (1876–1942)
- Aimé Venel (born 1950)
- Louis Mathieu Verdilhan (1875–1928)
- Claude Joseph Vernet (1714–1789)
- Horace Vernet (1789–1863)
- Bernard Vidal (born 1944)
- Élisabeth Vigée-Lebrun (1755–1842)
- Victor Vignon (1847–1909)
- Jean Vigoureux (1907–1986)
- Jean-Marie Villard (1828–1899)
- Marie-Denise Villers (1774–1821)
- Jacques Villon (1875–1963)
- Henri Vincent-Anglade (1876–1956)
- André-Léon Vivrel (1886–1976)
- Lucien Vogt (1891–1968)
- Simon Vouet (1590–1649)
- Arnaud Courlet de Vregille (born 1958)
- Édouard Vuillard (1868–1940)
- Joseph Wamps (1689–1744)
- Louise Ward (1849–1930)
- Antoine Watteau (1684–1721)
- François Willi Wendt (1909–1970)
- Georges Yatridès (1931–2019)
- Sergei Aleksandrovich Zalshupin (1898 or 1900-1931)
- Félix Ziem (1821–1911)
- Achille Zo (1826–1901)

== By century ==
=== 15th century ===
- Robert Campin (1378–1445)
- Jean Fouquet (1425–1481)

=== 16th century ===
- Jean Clouet (1480–1541)
- Corneille de Lyon (1500–1575)
- Jean Cousin the Elder (1500–c. 1593)
- François Clouet (1515–1572)
- Jean Cousin the Younger (c. 1522–1595)

=== 17th century ===
- Simon Vouet (1590–1649)
- Louis Le Nain (1593–1648)
- Nicolas Poussin (1594–1665)
- Jacques Stella (1596–1657)
- Jacques Linard (1597–1645)
- Sebastian Stoskopff (1597–1657)
- Le Nain brothers (c. 1599–1677)
- Philippe de Champaigne (1602–1674)
- Jean Nicolle (1610–c. 1650)
- Pierre Mignard (1612–1695)
- Daniel Hallé (1614–1675)
- Pierre Le Tellier (1614–1702)
- Marc Restout (1616–1684)
- Eustache Lesueur (1617–1655)
- Charles Le Brun (1619–1690)
- Jean-Baptiste de Champaigne (1631–1681)
- Jean Chardin (1643–1713)
- Jean Jouvenet (1644–1717)
- François de Troy (1645–1730)
- Nicolas Colombel (1646–1717)
- Jacques Restout (1650–1701)
- Claude Guy Hallé (1652–1736)
- Eustache Restout (1655–1743)
- Louis de Boullogne (1657–1733)
- Pierre Berchet (1659–1720)

=== 18th century ===
- Nicolas Bertin (1667–1736)
- Thomas Restout (1671–1754)
- Nicolas de Poilly the Younger (1675–1747)
- Antoine Watteau (1684–1721)
- Jean-Baptiste Oudry (1686–1755)
- Nicolas Lancret (1690–1743)
- Jean Siméon Chardin (1699–1779)
- Étienne Jeaurat (1699–1789)
- Joseph Aved (1702–1766)
- François Boucher (1703–1770)
- Maurice Quentin de La Tour (1704–1788)
- Louis Michel van Loo (1707–1771)
- Jérôme-François Chantereau (1710?–?)
- Noël Hallé (1711–1781)
- Charles-Louis Clérisseau (1721–1820)
- Joseph Siffred Duplessis (1725–1802)
- Jean-Baptiste Greuze (1725–1805)
- Michel-Bruno Bellengé (1726–1793)
- Jean-Baptiste-Henri Deshays (1729–1765)
- Jean-Honoré Fragonard (1732–1806)
- Jean Bardin (1732–1809)
- Joseph Ducreux (1735–1802)
- Marie-Geneviève Navarre (1737–1795)
- Jacques-Louis David (1748–1825)
- Charles Eschard (1748–1810)
- Rosalie Filleul (1752–1794)
- Jean-Baptiste Regnault (1754–1829)
- Élisabeth Vigée-Lebrun (1755–1842)
- François-Léonard Dupont-Watteau (1756–1824)
- Louis-Léopold Boilly (1761–1845)
- Sophie Prieur (active late 18th century)

=== 19th century ===
- Zoé Goyet (died 1869)
- Jean-Baptiste Goyet (1779–1854)
- Jean-François Boisard (1762–1820)
- Thomas Henry (1766–1836)
- Marie-Denise Villers (1774–1821)
- Dominique Ingres (1780–1867)
- Johan Stephan Decker (1784–1844)
- Stéphanie de Virieu (1785–1873)
- Charles-Caïus Renoux (1795–1846)
- Xavier Leprince (1799–1826))
- Clara Filleul (1822–1878)
- Théodore Géricault (1791–1824)
- Jean-Baptiste Louis Gros (1793–1870)
- Jean-Baptiste-Camille Corot (1796–1875)
- Amélie Legrand of Saint-Aubin (1797–1878)
- Eugène Goyet (1798–1857)
- Eugène Delacroix (1798–1863)
- Alexandre-Gabriel Decamps (1803–1860)
- Eugène Lepoittevin (1806–1870)
- Narcisse Virgilio Díaz (1807–1876)
- Jean-Hippolyte Flandrin (1809–1864)
- Théodore Rousseau (1812–1867)
- Ernest Breton (1812–1875)
- Jean-François Millet (1814–1875)
- Antoine Chintreuil (1816–1873)
- Louise Astoud-Trolley (1817–1883)
- Charles-François Daubigny (1817–1878)
- Théodore Chassériau (1819–1856)
- Gustave Courbet (1819–1877)
- Eugène Lavieille (1820–1889)
- Alfred Dehodencq (1822–1882)
- Rosa Bonheur (1822–1899)
- Jean-Baptiste Bertrand (1823–1887)
- Gustave Boulanger (1824–1888)
- Henri-Pierre Picou (1824–1895)
- Eugène Boudin (1824–1898)
- Pierre Puvis de Chavannes (1824–1898)
- William Bouguereau (1825–1905)
- Achille Zo (1826–1901)
- Gustave Moreau (1826–1898)
- Jules-Élie Delaunay (1828–1891)
- Camille Pissarro (1830–1903)
- Édouard Manet (1832–1883)
- Leon Bonnat (1833–1922)
- Louis Émile Benassit (1833–1902)
- Edgar Degas (1834–1917)
- Jean-Paul Laurens (1838–1921)
- Paul Cézanne (1839–1906)
- Claude Monet (1840–1926)
- Auguste Renoir (1841–1919)
- Frédéric Bazille (1841–1870)
- Berthe Morisot (1841–1895)
- Armand Guillaumin (1841–1927)
- Victor Tortez (1843–1890)
- Henri Rousseau (1844–1910)
- Gustave Caillebotte (1848–1894)
- Paul Gauguin (1848–1903)
- Gabriel Guay (1848–1923)
- Louise Ward (1849–1930)
- Gaston Anglade (1854–1919)
- Charles Angrand (1854–1926)
- Frédéric Samuel Cordey (1854–1911)
- Hippolyte Petitjean (1854–1929)
- Jules Monge (1855–1934)
- Henri Pinta (1856–1944)
- Auguste Prévot-Valéri (1857–1830)
- Georges Seurat (1859–1891)
- Charles-Amable Lenoir (1860–1926)
- James Tissot (1836–1902)

=== 20th century ===
- Pierre Abadie (1896–1972)
- Jean-François Batut (1828–1907)
- Paul Marny (1829–1914)
- Alexandre Rachmiel (1835–1918)
- Narcisse Chaillou (1835–1916)
- Andrée Belle (1840–1901)
- Louis Tauzin (1842–1915)
- Franz Schrader (1844–1924)
- Alfred-Arthur Brunel de Neuville (1852–1941)
- Charles-Fernand de Condamy (1855–1913)
- Jules Monge (1855–1934)
- Henri-Julien Dumont (1859–1921)
- Maurice Moisset (1860–1946)
- Aristide Maillol (1861–1944)
- Albert Joseph Pénot (1862–1930)
- Paul Signac (1863–1935)
- Henri de Toulouse-Lautrec (1864–1901)
- Charles Léon Godeby (1866–1952)
- Sophie Blum-Lazarus (1867–1944)
- André Devambez (1867–1944)
- Pierre Bonnard (1867–1947)
- Édouard Vuillard (1868–1940)
- Alfred Swieykowski (1869–1953)
- Henri Matisse (1869–1954)
- Henri Royer (1869–1938)
- Clément Castelli (1870–1959)
- Georges Dufrénoy (1870–1943)
- Maurice Denis (1870–1943)
- Tancrède Synave (1870–1936)
- Georges Rouault (1871–1958)
- Léon Printemps (1871–1945)
- Henry d'Estienne (1872–1949)
- Alfred Lesbros (1873–1940)
- Joseph de La Nézière (1873–1944)
- Louis Mathieu Verdilhan (1875–1928)
- Joseph Crepin (1875–1948)
- Henri Malançon (1876–1960)
- Henri Vincent-Anglade (1876–1956)
- Marguerite Delorme (1876–1946)
- Jean Puy (1876–1960)
- René Charles Edmond His (1877–1960)
- Henri Marret (1878–1964)
- Edmond-Édouard Lapeyre (1880–1960)
- Vincent Manago (1880–1936)
- Fernand Léger (1881–1955)
- Georges Barrière (1881–1944)
- Pierre Bodard (1881–1937)
- Charles Picart Le Doux (1881–1959)
- Georges Braque (1882–1963)
- Maurice Utrillo (1883–1955)
- Émile Colinus (1884–1966)
- André Beronneau (1886–1973)
- André-Léon Vivrel (1886–1976)
- Jacques Majorelle (1886–1962)
- Jean Rouppert (1887–1979)
- Alfred Latour (1888–1964)
- Paul Sibra (1889–1951)
- André Prévot-Valéri (1890–1959)
- Lucien Vogt (1891–1968)
- René Fontayne (1891–1952)
- Boris O'Klein (1893–1985)
- Roger de la Corbière (1893–1974)
- Maurice Savin (1894–1973)
- Jean de Botton (1898–1978)
- André Maire (1898–1984)
- Fernand Dauchot (1898–1982)
- Zareh Moskofian (1898–1987)
- Sergei Aleksandrovich Zalshupin aka Serge Chubine or Choubine (1898 or 1900-1931)
- Jean Cocteau (1889–1963)
- Louis Bissinger (1899–1978)
- Raymond Besse (1899–1969)
- Yitzhak Frenkel (1899–1981)
- Jean Dubuffet (1901–1985)
- Marcelle Bergerol (1901–1989)
- Pierre Bobot (1902–1974)
- Jean Bazaine (1904–2001)
- Henri Cadiou (1906–1989)
- Raymond Rochette (1906–1993)
- Camille Bryen (1907–1977)
- Jean Vigoureux (1907–1986)
- Édouard Delaporte (1909–1983)
- François Willi Wendt (1909–1970)
- Rex Barrat (1914–1974)
- Gérard Locardi (1915–1998)
- José Charlet (1916–1993)
- Andrée Le Coultre (1917–1986)
- Maurice Boitel (1919–2007)
- Renée Aspe (1922–1969)
- François Brochet (1925–2001)
- I.J. Berthe Hess (1925–1996)
- Arcabas (1926–2018)
- Bernard Rosenblum (1927–2007)
- T'ang Haywen (1927–1991)
- Alvaro Guillot (1931–2010)
- Georges Yatridès (1931–2019)
- Jean Pierre Serrier (1934–1989)
- Virgilije Nevjestić (1935–2009)
- Henri Sert (1938–1964)
- Yehiel Rabinowitz (born 1939)
- Ksenia Milicevic (born 1942)
- Bernard Vidal (1944–2019)
- Henri de Jordan (1944–1996)
- Jacques Pellegrin (painter) (born 1944)
- Claude Plessier (born 1946)
- Monique de Roux (born 1946)
- Victor Koulbak (born 1946)
- Ahmed Hajeri (born 1948)
- Bracha L. Ettinger (born 1948)
- Aimé Venel (born 1950)
- Karen Joubert Cordier (born 1954)
- Jean Paul Leon (born 1955)
- Pierre Lamalattie (born 1956)
- Denis Prieur (born 1957)
- Michel Suret-Canale (born 1957)
- Arnaud Courlet de Vregille (born 1958)
- Nicola Rosini Di Santi (born 1959)
- Wang Yan Cheng (born 1960)
- Jean Fernand (born 1948)
- Philippe Richard (born 1962)
- Philippe Calandre (born 1964)
- Jeff Roland (born 1969)
- Olivier Masmonteil (born 1973)
- Sotiris René Sidiropoulos (born 1977)
- Amar Ben Belgacem (1979–2010)
- Théo Mercier (born 1984)
- Seb Toussaint (born 1988)

== See also ==
- Category:French painters
- List of French artists – including all visual and plastic arts
- List of French engravers
