= Tancrède Synave =

French painter

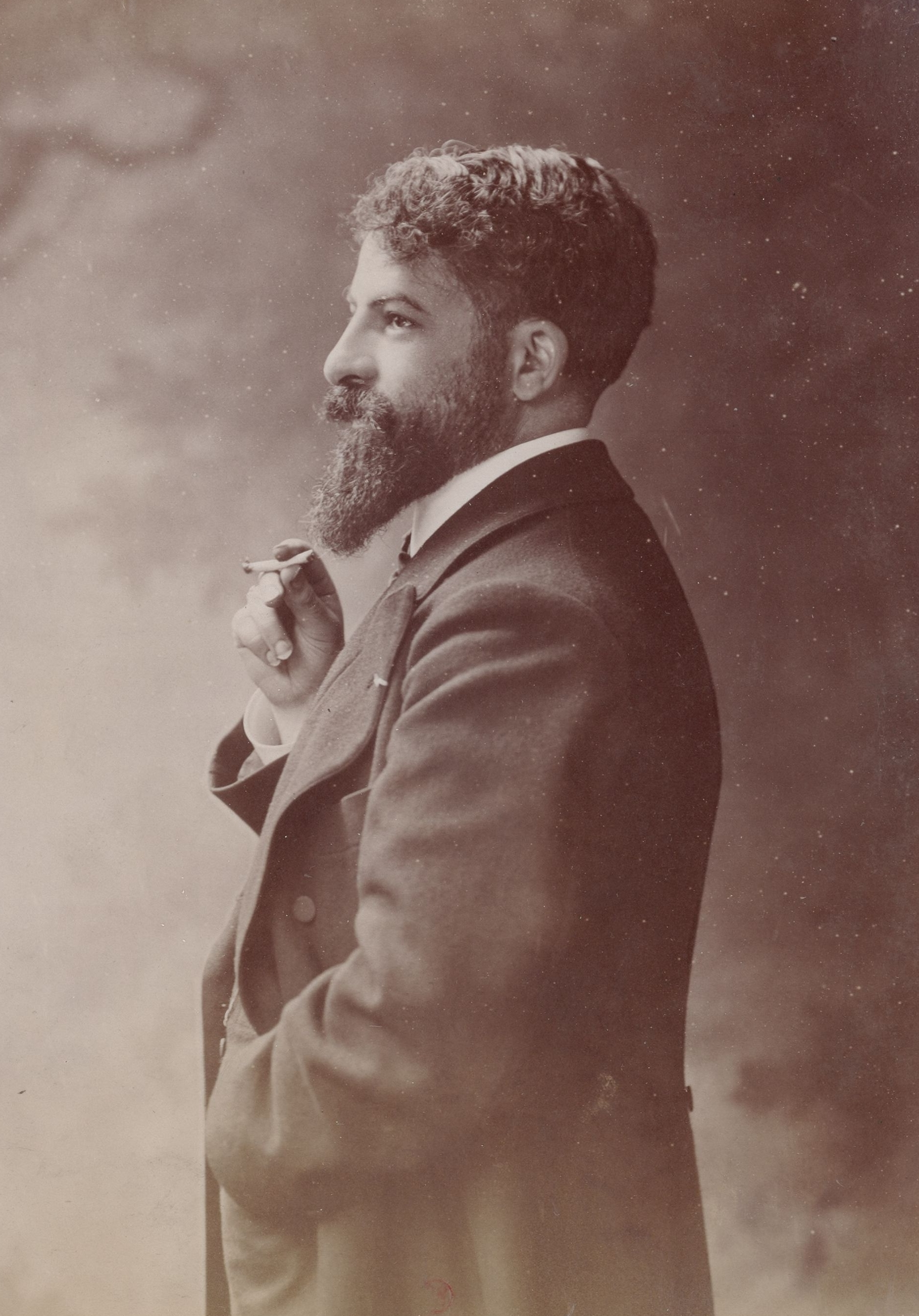
- Synave between 1890 and 1910.
- Born: 8 February 1870; 8th arrondissement of Paris
- Died: 11 February 1936 (aged 66); 13th arrondissement of Paris
- Resting place: Cimetière parisien de Thiais
- Education: Académie Julian
- Occupation: Painter
- Awards: Ordre des Palmes académiques Legion of Honour

Tancrède Julien Synave was a French painter. He was born in 1870 and died in 1936. He is known for his portraits of women in the Parisian high society.

== Sources and links ==
- Findartinfo Tancrède Synave's artworks in auctions.
- Artnet Photos of Tancrède Synave's paintings.
