= Sophie Blum-Lazarus =

French artist (1867–1944)

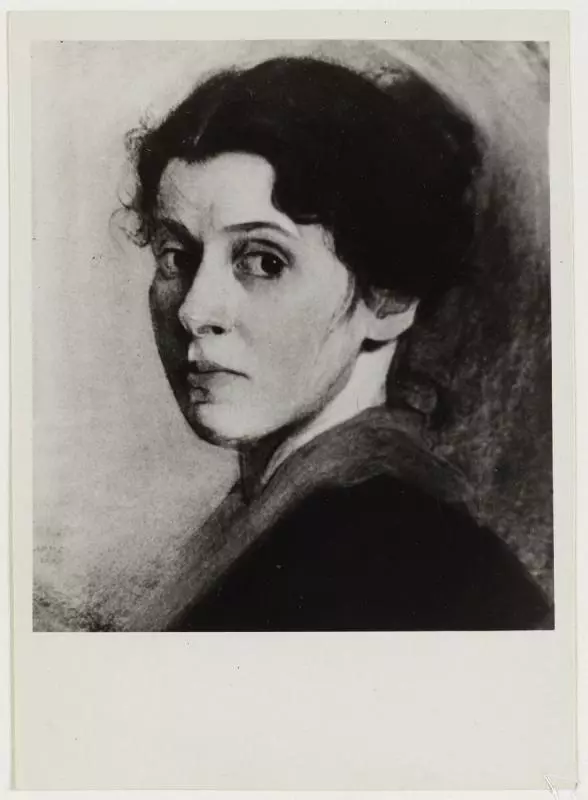
- Born: 15 July 1867; Stuttgart, Germany
- Died: 5 August 1944 (aged 77); Auschwitz concentration camp, German-occupied Poland
- Occupations: Painter, pastellist

Sophie Blum-Lazarus (née Lazarus; 15 July 1867 – 5 August 1944) was a French-Jewish painter and pastellist of German origin. She was murdered in the Auschwitz concentration camp in 1944.

== Life ==
Born in 1867 in Stuttgart to a wealthy Jewish family, Blum-Lazarus later moved to Frankfurt. She studied painting at the Städelschule and later entered the Academy of Fine Arts, Munich, where she made copies of works by classical painters. Around 1900, Blum-Lazarus married Jewish industrialist Daniel Blum and moved to Paris, where she became a member of the Société des Artistes Indépendants. She exhibited her work in 1909 and 1913 at the Salon d'Automne. After her husband's death in 1937, Blum-Lazarus became reclusive, and spent the next seven years living in a hotel. Having acquired French citizenship, she stayed in Paris during the Second World War. She was arrested on 8 July 1944 by the Gestapo and deported to Auschwitz three weeks later, where she soon died. In 2005, her artwork was posthumously displayed at a Musée du Montparnasse exhibition dedicated to artists deported by the Nazis.
