= Rex Barrat =

French artist (1914–1974)

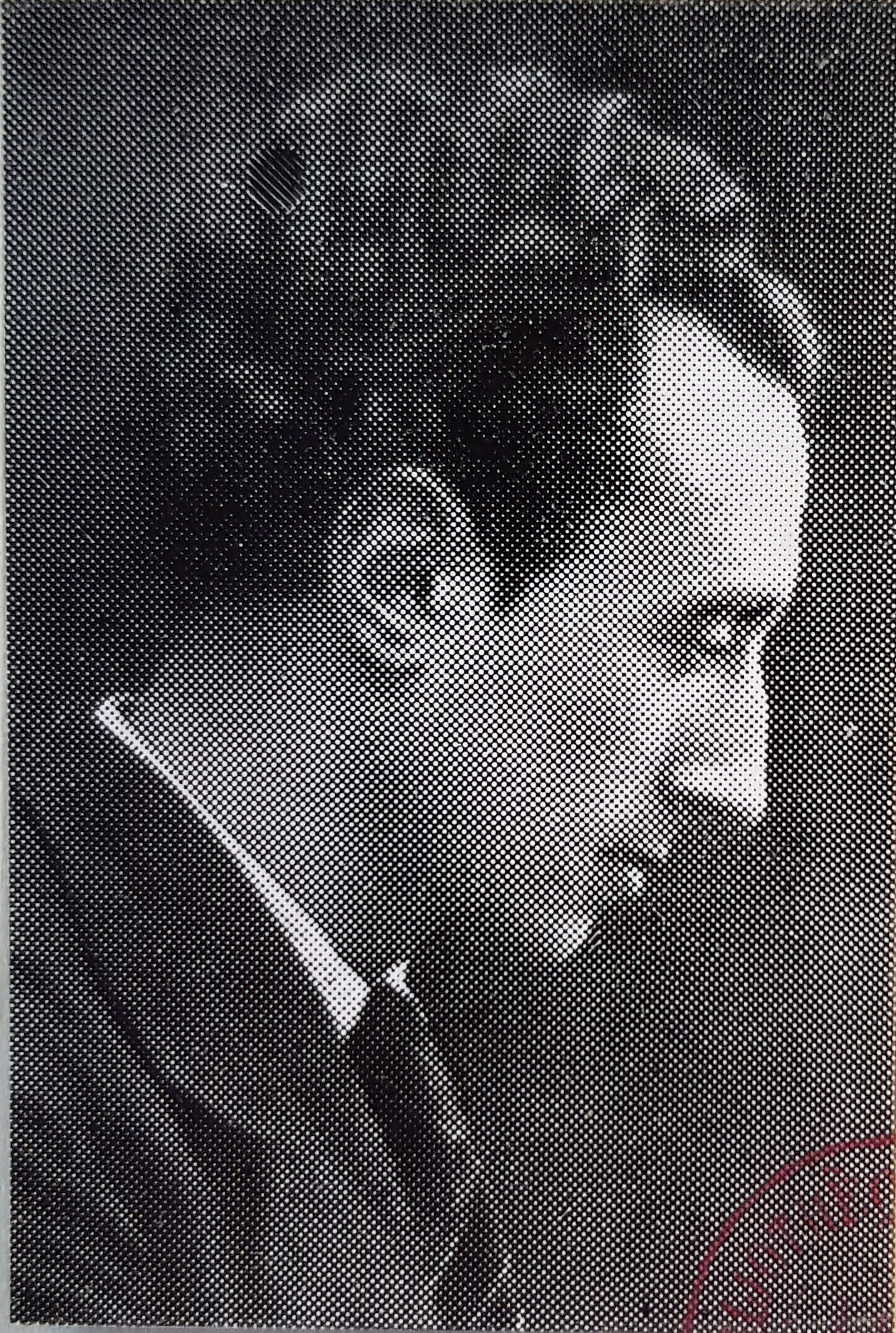
Rex Barrat

Rex Paulain Jack Barrat (French: [ʁɛks baʁa]; 1914–1974) was a French artist known especially for his landscape paintings. He was born in Varzy (Nièvre, France) and died in Créteil.

== Artworks ==
Barrat was known for his landscapes of Burgundy. His works belong to several public collections, including the Musée de la Loire in Cosne-sur-Loire and the public collection of the city Varzy, France.

== External sources ==
- Akoun 2004, page 67
- Artprice
- Musée de la Loire in Cosne-sur-Loire, France
