= Jean-François Batut =

French painter (1828–1907)

Jean-François Batut (26 June 1828 in Castres - 21 May 1907) was a French painter known for his portraits, with subjects including Ferdinand de Lesseps and Gustave Eiffel. His son Léopold (born 1856) was also a painter.
