= André Beronneau =

French painter

André Beronneau (1886–1973) was a French painter active during the first half of the 20th century. He is famous for his sumptuous French landscapes of southern Brittany and Provence. He exhibited his works at the Salon des Indépendants in Paris between 1926 and 1935.

== Œuvres ==
- Saint-Tropez-Vieille tour, Musée Alfred-Canel (Pont-Audemer, 27)

== Sources and external links ==
- Artnet Photos of André Beronneau's artworks.
- Findartinfo André Beronneau's artworks in auctions.
