= Joseph Crepin =

French painter (1875–1948)

Joseph Crépin (1875–1948) was a French painter and close friend of the famed coal miner and artist Augustin Lesage. Crépin's work is considered to be part of Art Brut, and he is often characterized as an outsider artist. His paintings and drawings were influenced by his belief in spiritualism. Crépin was introduced to spiritualism in 1930 and became a spirit-healer the following year. Crépin is often noted for not beginning his major works until he was in his 60s. He believed that what he painted was communicated to him by the dead. His meticulously detailed flat compositions often portrayed fantastic architectural forms. He kept his methods of painting a secret.

Despite starting late, his output was prolific. He painted 345 paintings in less than a decade. He also prophesied that he would bring peace to the world upon completing 300 paintings, claiming he had been ordered to do so by angels. He finished his 300th painting on May 5, 1945, the same day the Nazis surrendered to the Allies. He produced forty-five more paintings prior to his death in 1948. Crépin continues to be recognized as one of the classic Outsider Artists for what critics refer to as the "astounding visual power" of his work.

For most of his life, Crépin worked as a plumber and roofer and played clarinet in his father's cafe and nightclub. He directed a brass band later in his life. In accordance with his wishes, he was buried with all the drawings which had served as his drafts.
