= Jean-François Boisard =

French painter and poet

Jean-François Boisard (ca. 1762 – ca. 1821) in Caen was a French painter and poet. Boisard was initially interested in painting but shifted to poetry constructively.

He left France at the time of the French Revolution and was part of the "émigration", namely the royalist families supposed to plot against the new regime from foreign countries. He nevertheless returned to France at the worst moment, namely during the "Terreur" of 1793, during which close to 40,000 persons were arrested and executed. He was himself condemned to death but escaped the sentencing for unknown reasons. He then lived a miserable life, constantly on the move and dependent on alms and the assistance of dignitaries for whom he wrote dedications.

His fate somewhat improved with the Bourbon Restoration in 1815. He published two collections of some 300 fables "dedicated to the king", in 1817 and 1822 (Fables dédiées au roi). Their quality can certainly not be compared with the work of his uncle.

The date of his death is not known precisely but was between 1821 and 1823.

== Works ==
- Fables dédiées au roi, Paris 1817.
- Fables faisant suite à celles qui sont dédiées au roi. Paris, 1822.
