= Fernand Dauchot =

French painter

Fernand Dauchot (French: [fɛʁnɑ̃ doʃo]; 1898–1982) was an expressionist painter.

== Biography ==
Fernand Dauchot was born in 1898 in Paris. The artist participated to World War I combats in 1917 and lost his left arm. Still, the disabled artist went to Brittany in 1923 and started to paint with other artists in Pont-Aven. The painter is famous for his superb landscapes of France's Brittany region, and his works belong to several public collections, among them the Museum of Art of the city of Quimper.

== Artworks in public collections ==
- L'Aven au Plessis, 1926, Musée des Beaux-Arts de Quimper, France

== Exhibitions ==
- Rétrospective Fernand Dauchot, from June 11 to October 2, 2011, at the Faouët Museum, Brittany, France

== Sources and external links ==
- Le Faouët Museum, Brittany, France
- Museum of Quimper
