= José Charlet =

French artist

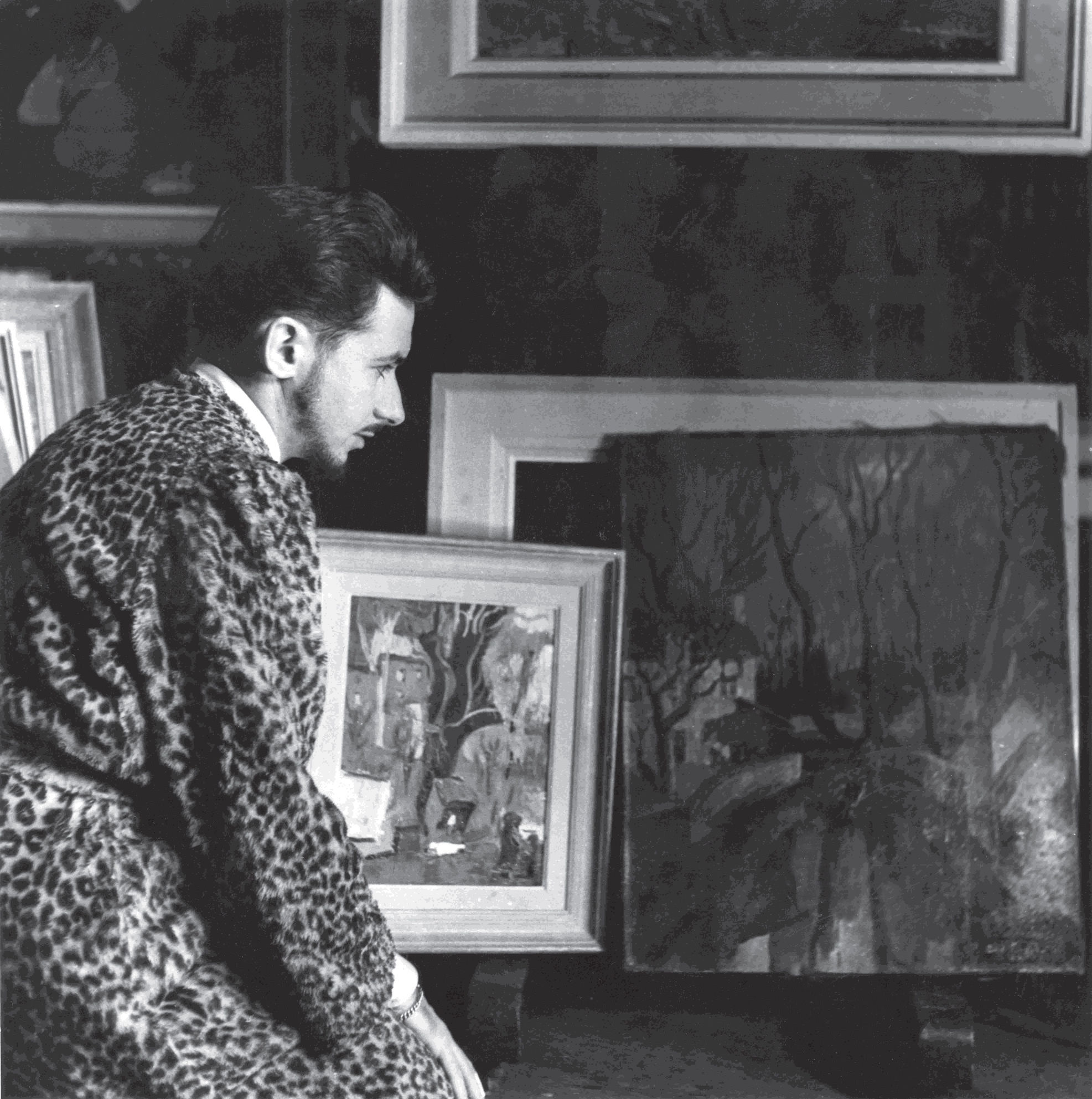
José Charlet

José Charlet (October 19, 1916 in Bourg-en-Bresse – 1993) was a French architect, painter, sculptor, and professor at the Beaux Arts of Paris. Architect of the 49, rue du Pas Saint Maurice House in Suresnes France in 1959

== Life ==
From 1946, he exhibited his work in Los Angeles, where the MOMA of New York bought a sculpture from him.
