= Édouard Delaporte =

French painter, architect, and sculptor

- Born: 14 November 1909; Paris, France
- Died: 6 July 1983 (aged 73); Saint-Jeannet, Nice, France
- Education: Ecole Nationale Superieure des Beaux-Arts

Édouard Delaporte (14 November 1909 – 6 July 1983) was a French painter, architect, and sculptor.

== Biography ==
Delaporte was born in Paris in 1909. In 1929, at age 20, he began painting. He graduated from the Ecole Nationale Superieure des Beaux-Arts in Paris, and in 1937. he became an architect certified by the government. In 1939. he was drafted to serve in World War II. After the war, in 1946, Delaporte left France and moved to Rabat, Morocco. For ten years he built many public buildings, villas, and private homes. In 1956, when Morocco gained independence, he returned to France and settled in Antibes. In 1978 he moved to Saint-Jeannet, a small town in the interior of Nice, where he devoted himself to painting. He died on 6 July 1983 at his home, Place sur le Four.

== Major exhibitions ==
- 1959: Picasso Museum, in the Castle of Antibes .
- 1961: Group exhibition "Les Revenants" in the Musée Picasso, Château d'Antibes.
- 1963: Exhibition particularly in Paris with Camille Renaud .
- 1963: Solo exhibition, 23, Place Saint-André-des-Arts, Paris. Submitted by René de Solier .
- 1971: House of Culture of Firminy, by Jacques Prévert .
- 1972: Sculpture exhibition in the Musée Picasso, Château d'Antibes. Catalog, "Sculptures present ones pair Michel Butor ".
- 1973: Picasso Museum, Château d'Antibes. Paintings and Sculptures. Submitted by Romuald Dor of Souchère .
- 1974: The House of Culture of Grasse .
- 1975: Picasso Museum, Château d'Antibes. Submitted by Romuald Dor of Souchère .
- 1985: Exhibition of Edouard Delaporte, as part of the event "Le Parlement des Idoles"
- 1985: Villa Arson, Nice .
- 1994: Gallery Mantoux-Gignac. Submitted by Michel Butor Cf "Evocation".
- 2002: Exhibition particular, "Epouvantails et architecture." Space Paul Mayer, University of Picardie Jules Verne.

== Architecture ==
Among the best and most famous architectural works of Édouard Delaporte include the following:

- Foch Stadium Gymnasium in Rabat
- Ben Kemoun residential block in Rabat, Morocco 1952
- Border crossing in Khedadra
- North Perceptions Rabat
- House for an architect in Rabat
- Villa in Salé, Morocco
- Villa Menguy in Rabat, Morocco 1952
