= Charles-Fernand de Condamy =

French animal painter

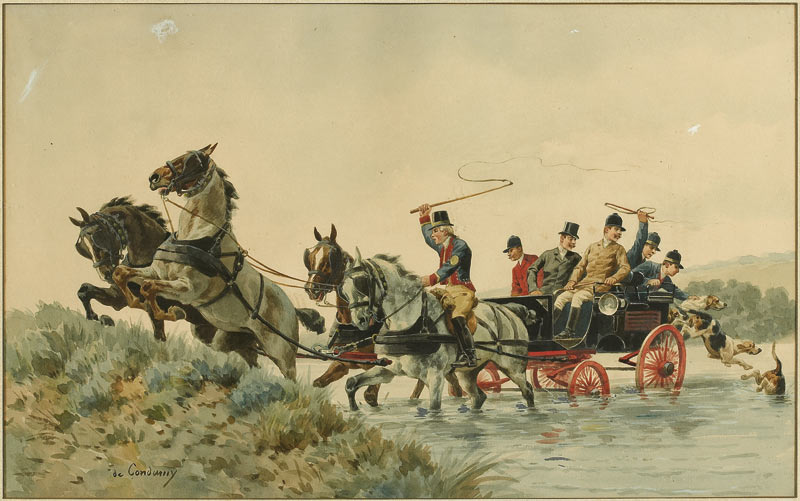
L'équipage

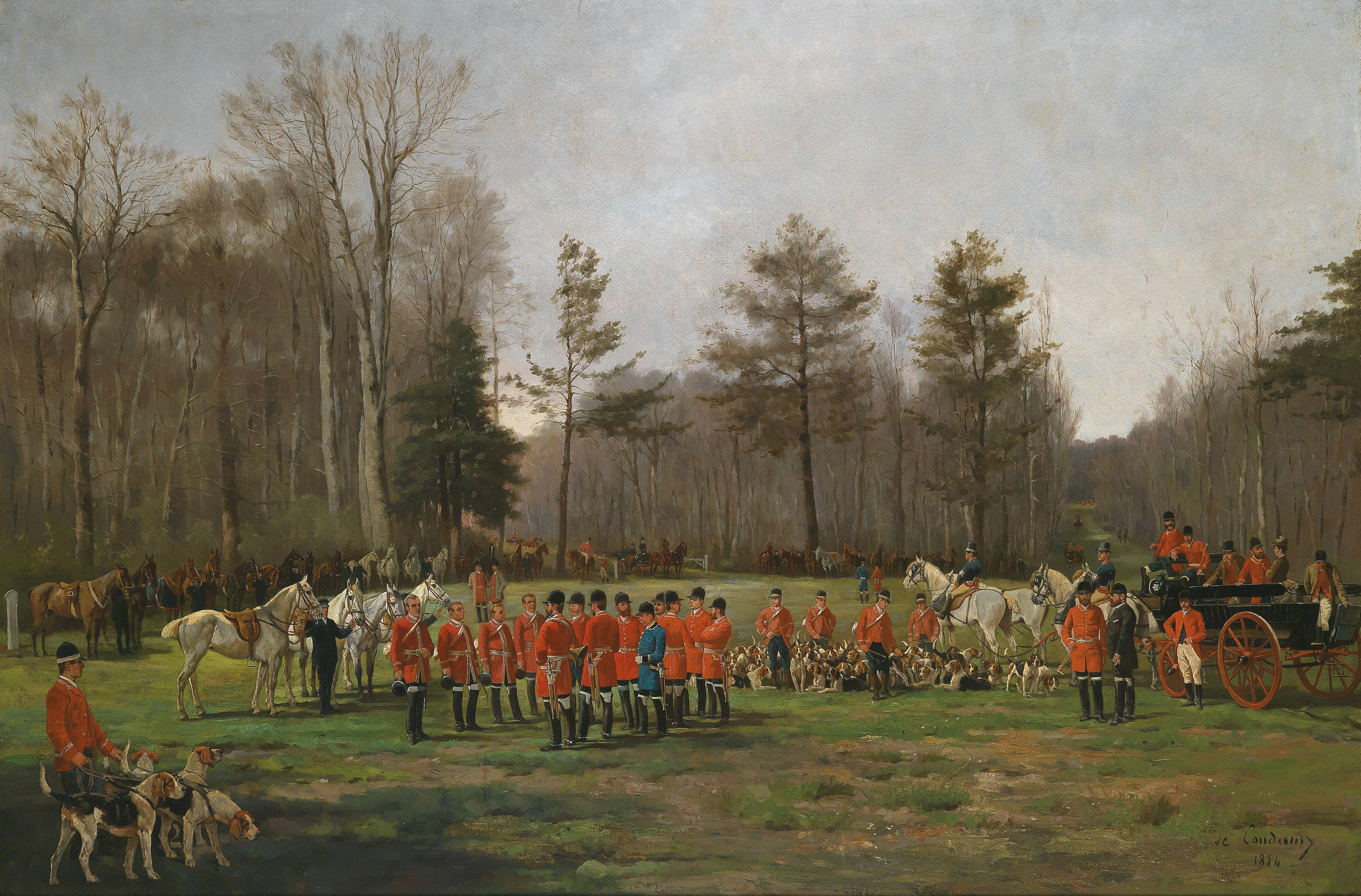
Foxhunting

Charles-Fernand de Condamy (1855-1913) was a French animal painter.
