= Boris O'Klein =

French painter

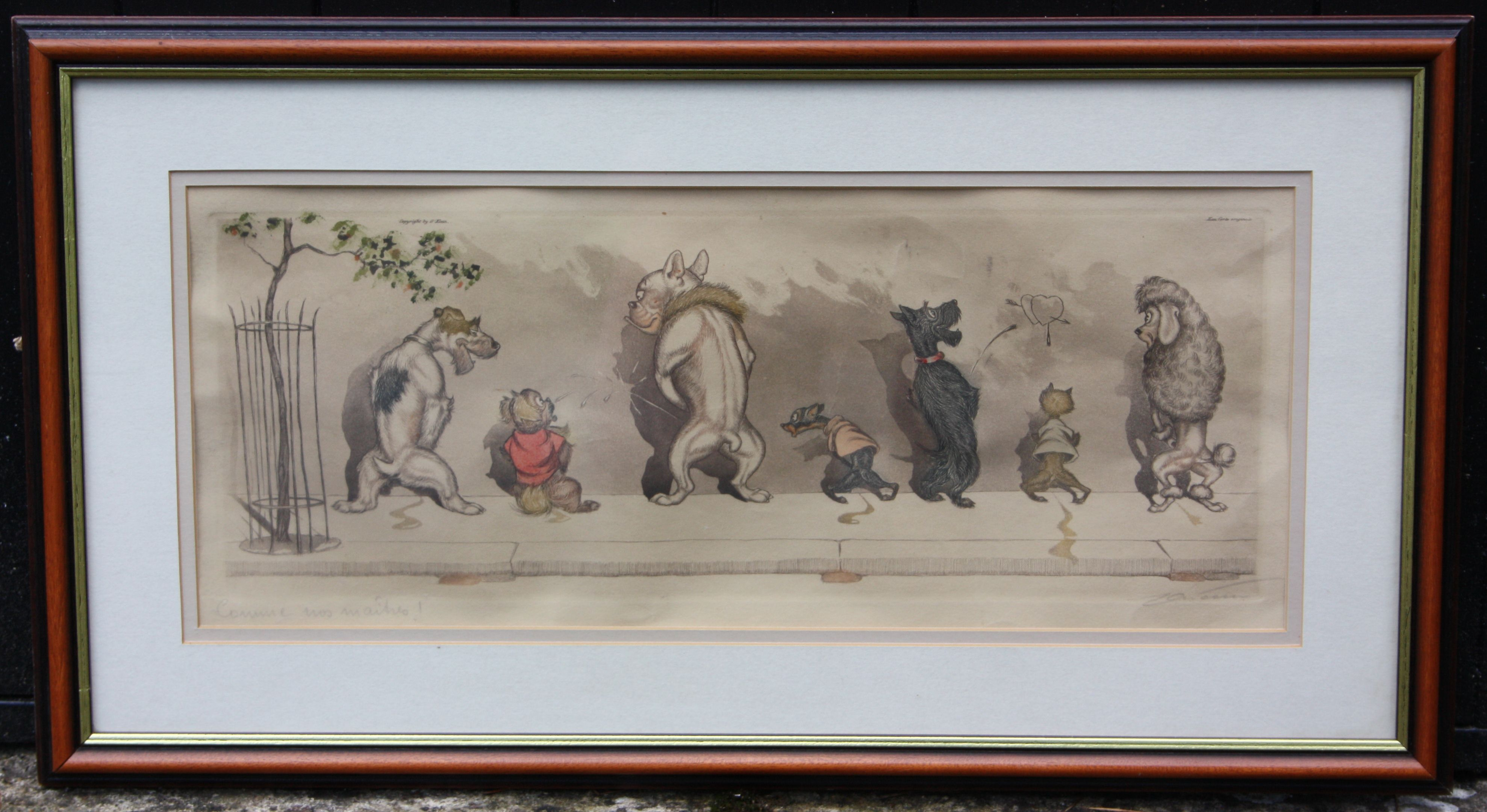
Comme nos maîtres (Like our masters): original hand-painted and signed etching

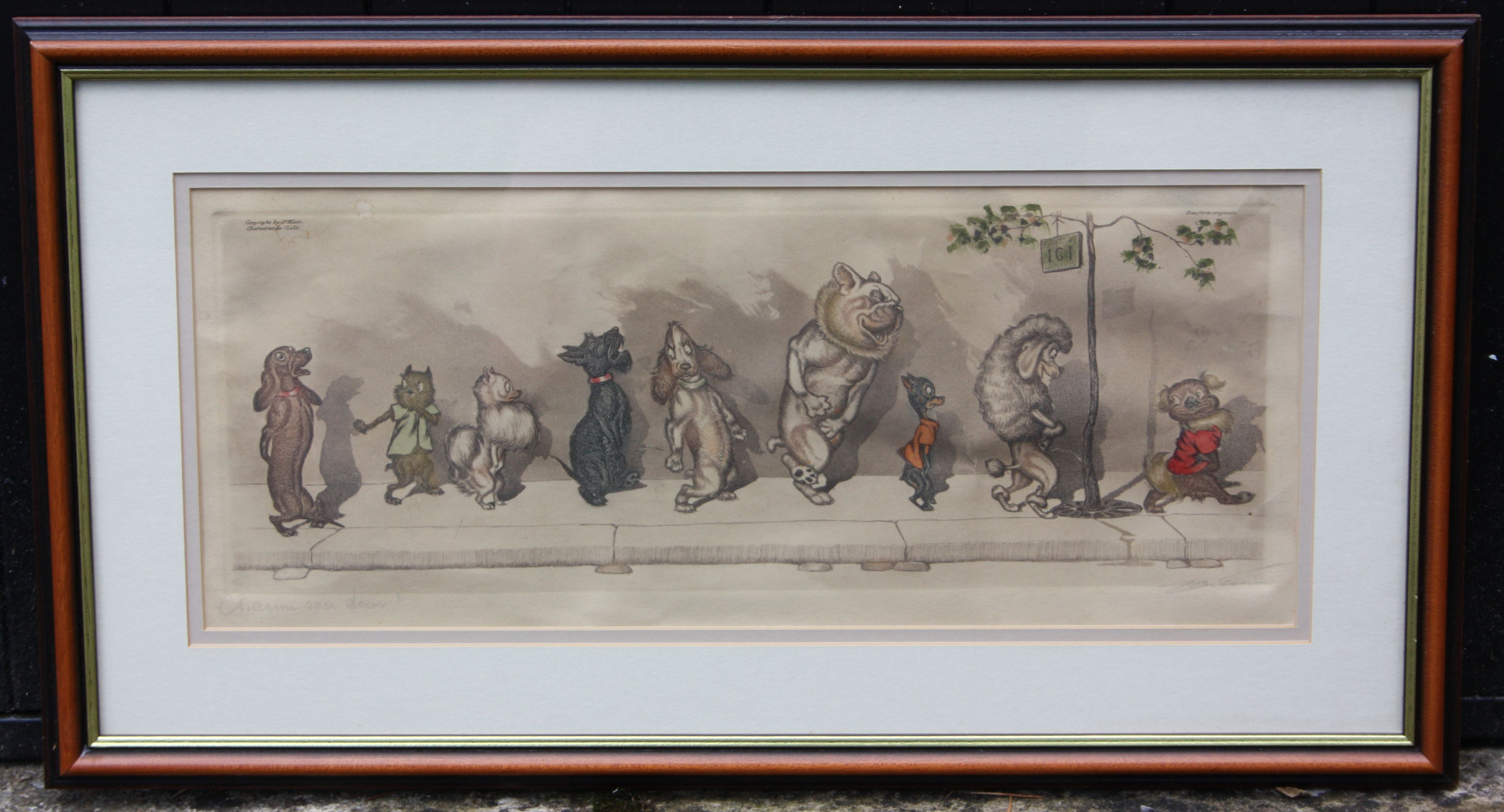
Chacun son tour (Wait your turn)

Boris O'Klein, born Arthur 'Boris' Klein, (Moscow, September 26, 1893 – 1985), a French artist and cartoonist. An anthropomorphic artist, he is known for his numerous prints and watercolors of dogs getting up to mischief. The prints are generally called "The Naughty Dogs" or "The Dirty Dogs" or "The Dirty Dogs of Paris."

== Personal ==
O'Klein was born in Moscow, Russia. His family emigrated to the Alsace when he was a boy.

After serving on behalf of the French in World War I, he moved to Paris.

== Career ==
O'Klein's period of greatest activity as an artist was during the 1930s, 1940s, and 1950s.

During his lifetime, much of his output appears to have been purchased by tourists on trips to Paris.

=== Jean Herblet ===
O'Klein also painted with similar technique and in a more classical style many serious animal subjects, often a hunting dog with a duck, under the pseudonym "Jean Herblet".

== Technique ==
While O'Klein was a prolific artist and produced many watercolors, the greatest part of his output consists of prints, either color lithographs or engravings heightened with hand-painted touches of watercolor.

Many of these prints appear to have been produced in O'Klein's later years and after his death, and are still produced to this day.

== Themes ==
The two main themes of O'Klein's art are (1) public urination; and (2) male-female flirtation or desire. The numerous scenes by O'Klein of dogs lined up against walls or beside trees to urinate are part of what gives the prints their incendiary appeal for some viewers. In other prints, a number of male dogs will follow a female dog with an air of evident interest.

== O'Klein in popular culture ==
=== Television ===
In the second episode of season one of the Stephen Fry TV show Kingdom, a print by O'Klein is used as part of the set decor in the living room in the house owned by the character played by Steve Pemberton. The print by O'Klein is one of those which shows a row of anthropomorphic dogs urinating against a wall, giving a window onto the character's psychology and taste in art.
