= Louis Nattero =

French painter

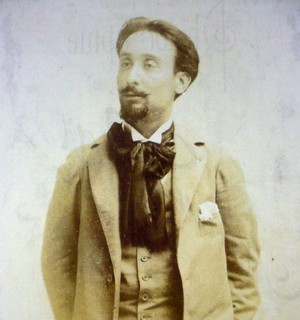
Louis Nattero

Louis Alexandre Marie Nattero (16 October 1870 – 10 November 1915 in Marseilles) was a French painter. He was known for his sea and port pictures and depictions of local street scenes and children. He also painted the Port of Toulon.
