= Michel Suret-Canale =

French painter

- Born: March 4, 1957 (age 69)
- Occupations: Artist, teacher, web-designer and author

Michel Suret-Canale (born March 4, 1957) is a French artist, teacher, web-designer and author, known primarily for being one of the earliest artists to eschew the art gallery scene and take his work directly to the public through online auctions.

== Early life ==
Born in the suburb of Boulogne-Billancourt on March 4, 1957, Michel Suret-Canale spent his childhood in the artistic center of Paris, growing up in the home of his grandfather, medalist and publisher of art medals Victor S. Canale (1883–1958) who was also a sculptor, ceramicist, printmaker and inventor. He is the son of the late Jean Suret-Canale (1921–2007), an extensively published author, French historian of Africa, political activist, and World War II resistance fighter and Georgette (Lamargot) Suret-Canale, a poet and journalist.

Michel Suret-Canale decided to become an artist by the age of 14. After his secondary education at the Lycée Claude Bernard in Paris, Michel enrolled at the University of Arts and Sciences of Art, Department of Paris I Panthéon Sorbonne, eventually earning a doctorate in Arts and Sciences of Art with honors by unanimous decision of the jury.

== Art career ==
Throughout the years Michel Suret-Canale has found ways to express himself artistically in various disciplines including scenography, publication, graphics and multimedia. Between 1984 and 2007 he did extensive work with the troupe of French theatrical clowns, Les Matapeste, with his contributions including set and costume design, advertising posters, photography and the design of their Website. He has taught both children and adults in schools and universities throughout France as well as holding private art classes in his studio. He has also conducted ongoing research in methods of digital art, the results of which can be seen in his robotic paintings as well as his New York RE-Views series of combine paintings from the summer of 2008.

As a visual artist, Michel Suret-Canale is one of the first artists to look beyond selling through agents and galleries by offering his work on eBay auctions, enabling him to be in direct contact with collectors. While at first this met with some criticism, it was soon to prove a viable method of introducing his art to a worldwide audience. In 2003 he published the book Je vends et j’achète sur eBay (I Buy and Sell on eBay), a guidebook, with Osman Eyrolles Multimédia. More recently he has been uploading videos of himself on his auction sites (in both French and English), describing the artwork in the listing.

Suret-Canale's artwork has been shown in exhibitions throughout France as well as in Spain, Great Britain, Moscow, Casablanca (Morocco) and the United States.
