= François-Léonard Dupont-Watteau =

French painter

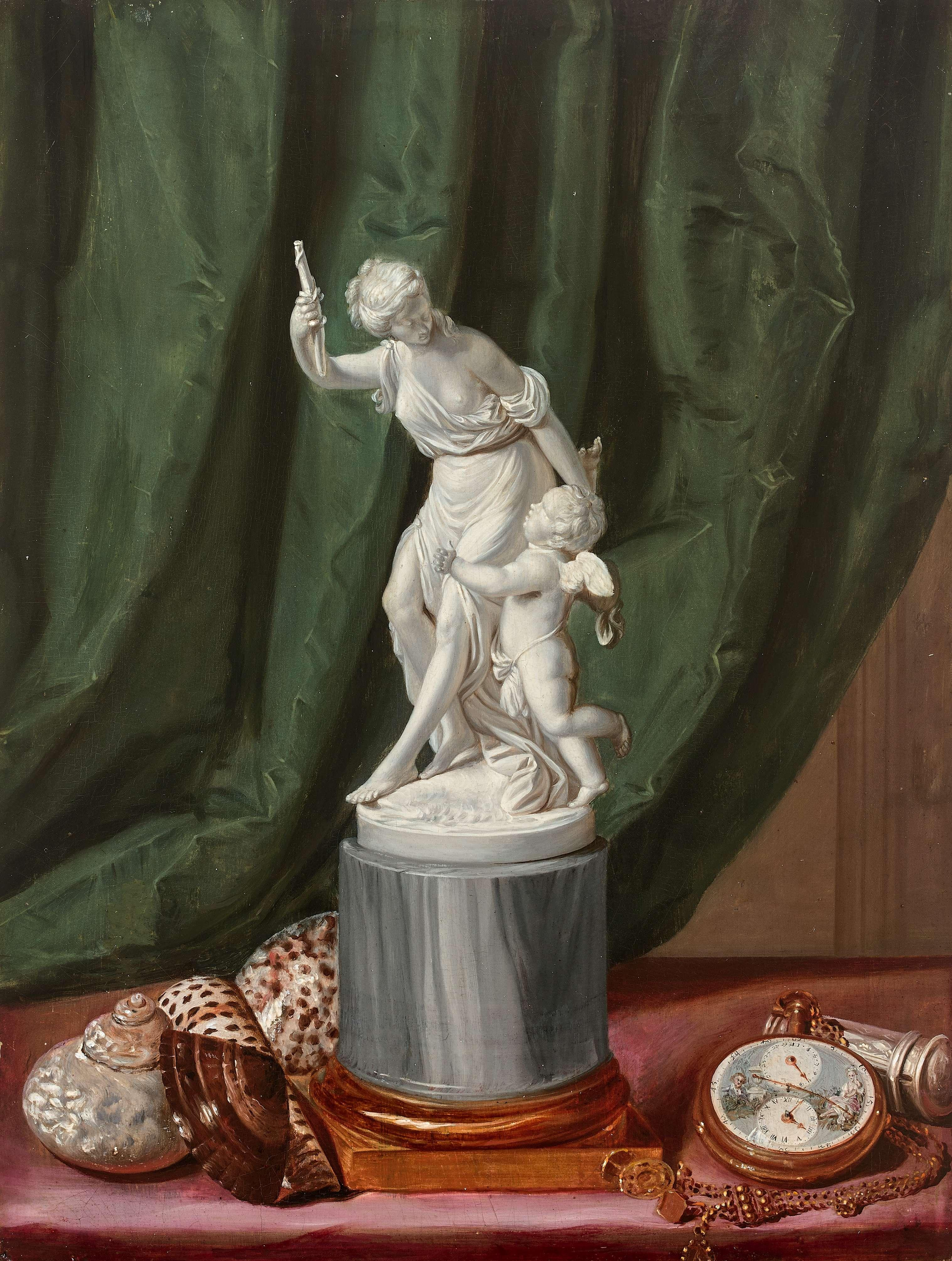
Composition with Venus disarming Cupid, seashells and a watch

François-Léonard Dupont, called Dupont-Watteau (1756–1824), was a French painter, miniaturist, and pastellist. He was born at Moorsel. He studied at Lille under Louis Watteau, whose daughter he married in 1782. In 1798 he gave up art for mechanics, with the study of which he had begun life. He died at Lille in 1824. During the years devoted to art, Dupont painted in all mediums and all subjects, including portraits and genre subjects. In the Lille Museum is a picture by him, dated 1785, of the Attributes of the Fine Arts, and in the Glasgow Corporation Galleries is The Vintage.
