= Philippe Calandre =

French artist

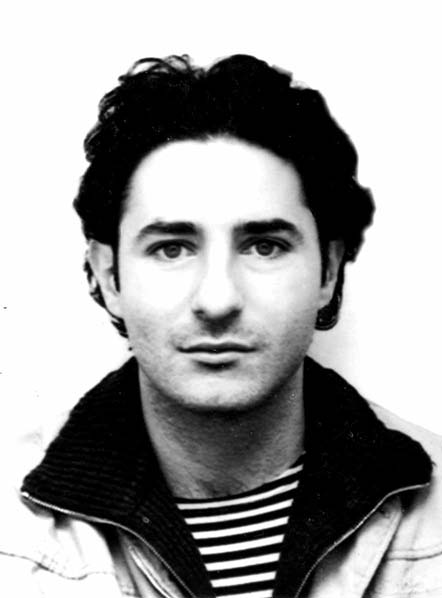
Philippe Calandre

Philippe Calandre (born 1964) is a French artist who combines photography, painting, and video.

== Early life ==
Calandre was born in Avignon, France in 1964. At 16, Calandre worked for two years as a shipman. He realized he was meant to be an artist while completing a portrait shoot.

== Professional career ==
Over several years, he split his time between personal research, travelling from Bolivia to Russia, and his work as a press photographer.

After an exhibition in Paris and Beirut, a Parisian gallery, Zabriskie, decided to include his work alongside those of Weegee and Leonard Freed as part of its « Une nuit, un voleur » series in 1996. A few years later, the National Fund for Contemporary Art acquired ‘Ghost Stations’, a series depicting abandoned gas stations that Calandre discovered during his highway rambling.

Calandre is particularly interested in architectural photography. In all his photographic series, what he views as 'reality' serves as the foundation from which he creates his worlds where an ambiguity exists between the real and the imagined settles in.

His studies often were used as a springboard to highlight everyday architectural aspects, pulled from their daily lifelessness and given life. Gas stations, then his ‘silos’, which were presented at FIAC in 2001 by Anne Barrault, the Parisian gallery, with whom the artist collaborated from 1999 to 2007, were lifted to the realm of the supernatural.

For ‘Insomnia’ (2006), which depicts strange nocturnal apparitions, Calandre explored the world of the fantastic with pure and spooky scenes.

From 1996, his various series have been displayed in galleries, museums, and contemporary art shows in France and abroad from Greece to Argentina to the Netherlands and back to New York and Taiwan.
