= Zareh Moskofian =

Ottoman painter

Zareh Moskofian (Armenian: Զարեհ Մոսքոֆեան, 1898 in Izmit, Ottoman Empire – 1987 in Lyon, France ) was an Ottoman painter of Armenian descent.

== Life ==
Of Armenian descent, Moskofian was born in Izmit. He attended the local Armenian school. Upon returning from a trip to Aleppo, Moskofian began painting. He started with painting the scenery of Constantinople. He then moved to Lyon, France. In France, Moskofian continued his career in the arts and became a teacher. He died in 1987. He is also noted that during World War II, Moskofian gave refuge and shelter to Jews escaping the Holocaust.
