= Benoît-Hermogaste Molin =

French painter

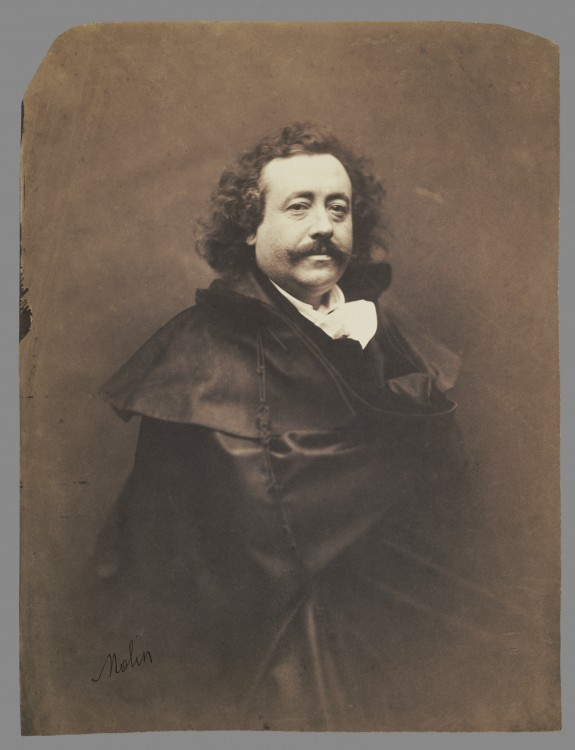
Portrait of Molin by Nadar.

Benoît-Hermogaste Molin (1810 in Chambéry – 1894) was a Savoyard and French painter, portraitist, genre painter and History painter.

He studied at the School of Paintings in Chambéry, his native town. He became a pupil of Gros in Paris. He presented regularly his paintings at the Salon (since 1843). His portrait of Joseph de Maistre was praised. Painter at the Court, until 1860 when the Duchy of Savoy was annexed by France, he became Director of Chambéry Musée des beaux-arts in 1850.
