= Alexandre Rachmiel =

French painter

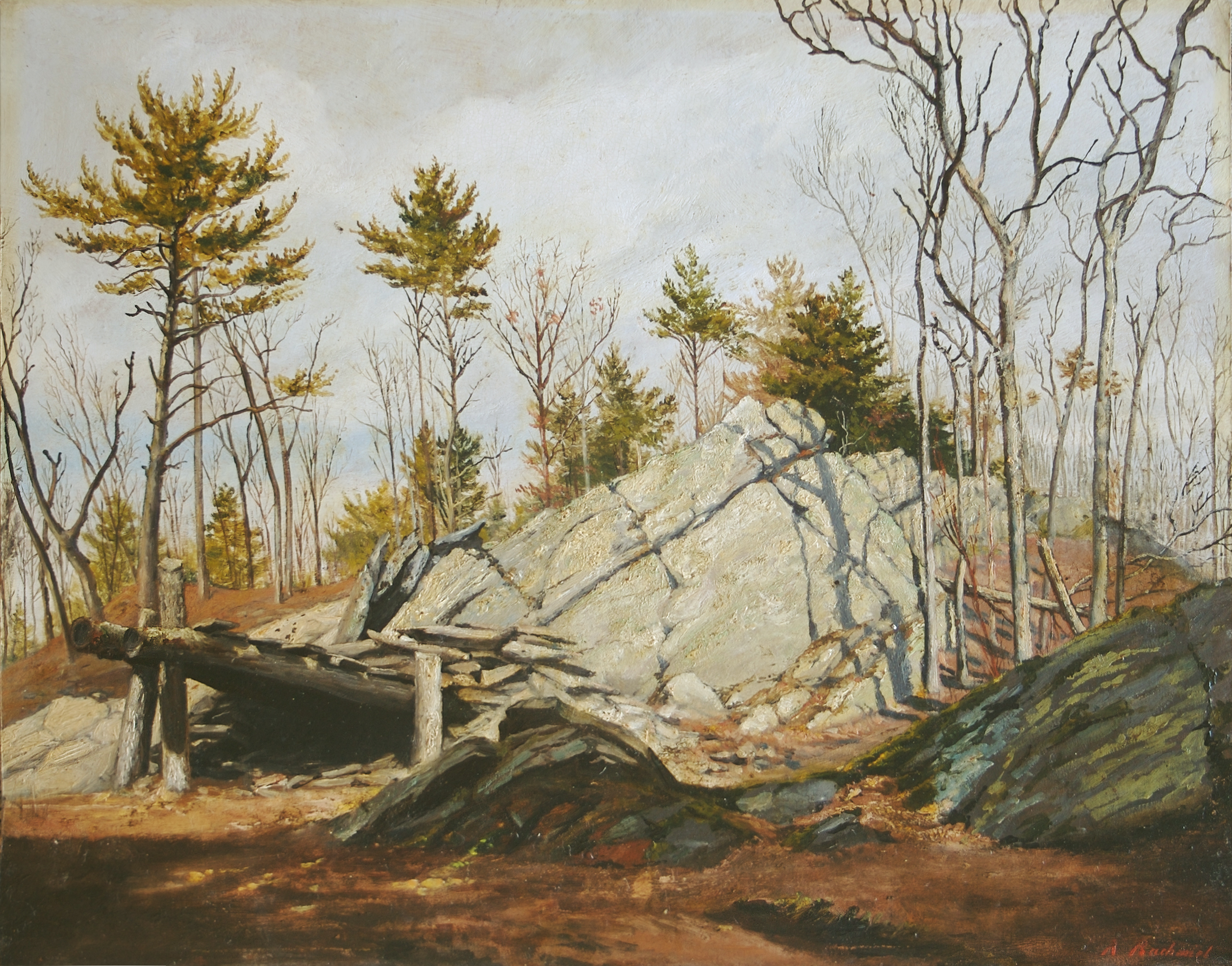
Autumn Landscape (ca. 1890), oil on board

Alexandre Rachmiel (1835–1918) was a French-born painter who later settled in the United States, and was active in New York State and California as well as France. Born in Alsace-Lorraine, France, in 1835, he is mainly noted for his sensitively-depicted landscapes.

His early artistic education was in France, where he was schoolmate of Jean-Jacques Henner. When the Franco-Prussian War broke out, Rachmiel found it necessary to immigrate to America, which he did in 1870. After arriving in New York, Rachmiel soon met and married Sarah Parker Scott, a widow with four daughters. The family settled in Haverstraw-on-Hudson. Their son, Jean Rachmiel, who was born in May 1871, would follow in his father's artistic footsteps, and has been called the "American Millet."

Rachmiel schooled his son in drawing and painting, and was a strict disciplinarian and critic, as well as a sympathetic friend to his son. In 1887 he sent Jean to New York to study at the Art Students League, and after three years of coursework, Rachmiel sent Jean to Paris. Throughout these years, Rachmiel continued to paint. In 1895, he joined his son in Paris, where Jean was studying with Léon Bonnat at the L'Ecole des Beaux-Arts. They shared a studio together from 1895-1902. Rachmiel returned to the United States and settled in California from 1901to 1902 and again in 1906. From 1903 to 1905, both father and son worked in Washington D.C., decorating the Corcoran Art Gallery.

Rachmiel painted in Philadelphia, Pasadena, Laguna, and Santa Barbara before his death at Vincennes, near Paris, in 1918.
