= Sophie Prieur =

French painter

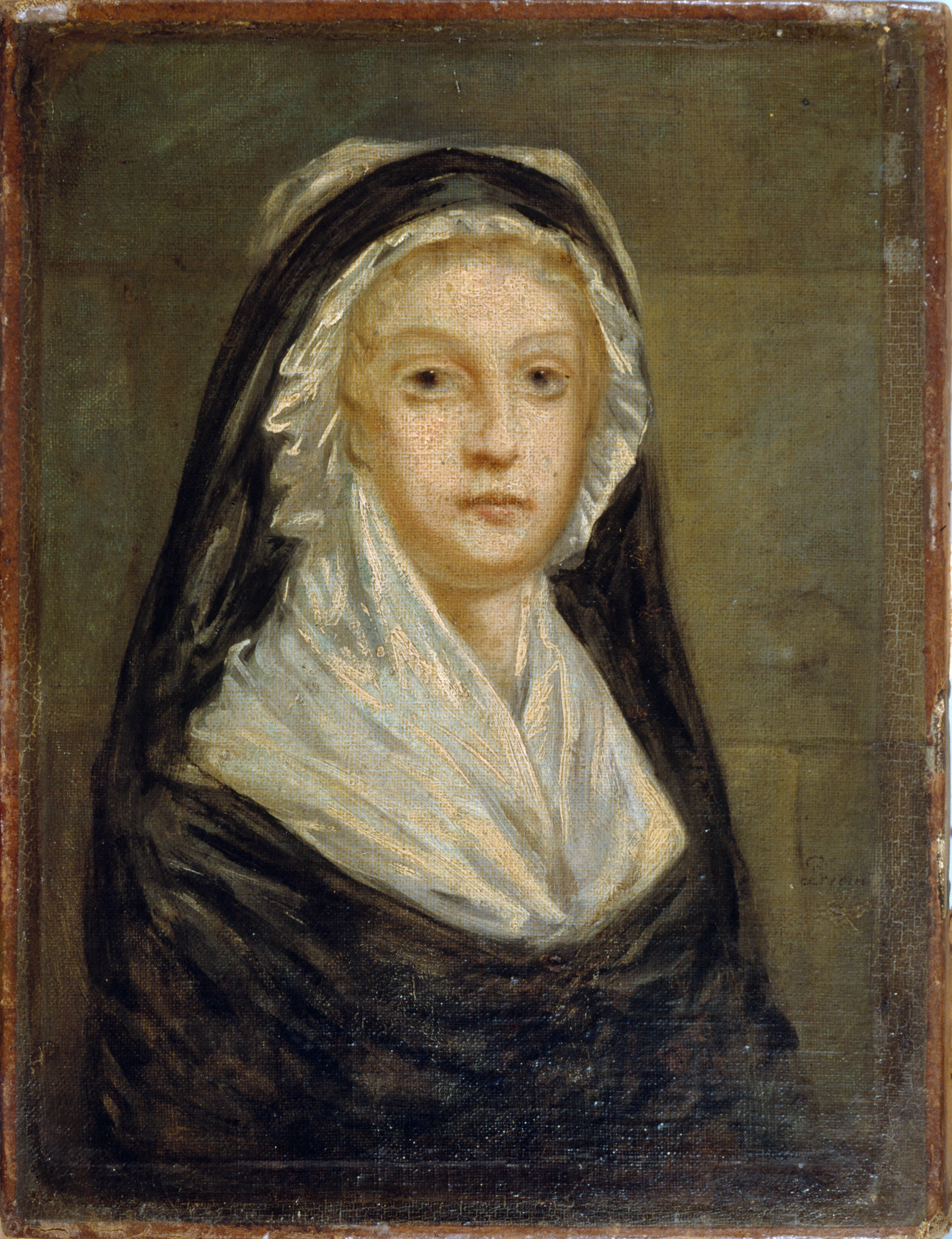
Queen Marie Antoinette of France in the prison Temple by Sophie Prieur, Carnavalet Museum, 1793

Sophie Prieur (27 October 1770–1 December 1852) was a French painter. She was the sister of the engraver and history painter Jean-Louis Prieur .

Prieur primarily painted portraits and still lifes. Her portrait of Marie Antoinette is in the Carnavalet Museum in Paris.
