= André Maire =

French painter

André Maire (1898 in Le Marais, Paris – 1984) was a French painter. Formally a student of André Devambez at the Beaux-Arts of Paris, his true debt was to Émile Bernard, though he belonged to no school. He lived for 13 years in Indochina.

== Works ==
- Saïgon: 40 gravures sur bois originales - André Maire, preface by Émile Bernard - 1930
