= Denis Prieur (painter) =

French painter

Denis Prieur is a painter born in Moret-sur-Loing, France, 1957, where he lived in a particularly painting oriented atmosphere. His grandfather Louis Prieur, was a painter. His father, Claude Prieur, a fresco painter, is still active working on French historic monuments.

== Biography ==
Aged 16, Denis Prieur enters the Ecole Nationale des Beaux-arts de Paris, integrating Pierre Carron and Pierre Faure's workshop. Aged 20, he exposes his work for the first time at la maison des Beaux-arts and meets with Albert Loeb, who will himself expose several of his paintings at his renowned Parisian gallery. The following year, Jean Clair, curator at Centre Georges Pompidou, visits his workshop and buys one of his paintings for the museum's collections.

Several times exhibited at the Maison des Beaux-arts (1978, 1991), he participates in the Salon de Monaco in 1996 and 1997, and was privileged with an exhibit at the Hôtel de Ville de Paris in 1995. Working with a resolutely classical approach, he declares: "I studied in a workshop where one was taught realism. Only one thing was missing for this school to be real and that was mystery. Indeed mystery does punctuate a man's life and provides it with meaning. I want to celebrate these mysteries in my paintings... For a long time I have been trying to represent the torsion of light on a body or in the ambiance of a painting..."
