= Henri Marret =

French painter

Henri Justin Marret,(February 15, 1878 – July 25, 1964) was a French painter and engraver. He was born in Paris and died in Fourqueux (Yvelines).
