= Victor Tortez =

French painter

Victor Tortez (18 July 1843 — 1890) was a French painter of the beaux arts school, taught by Jean-Jacques Henner. His paintings ranged from studio portraits of aristocrats to nude studies of women and children.

Tortez was born in Paris and was a pupil of Jean-Léon Gérôme.
