= Claude Plessier =

French painter (born 1946)

Claude Plessier (born 1946, Paris) is a French painter, who has worked in France and Argentina.

A graduate of the Arts Décos, the Beaux-Arts and the Allgemeine Gewerbe Schule in Basel he was awarded a scholarship by the Italian government to study mosaic in Ravenna in 1971. He has lived and worked in Paris since 1978.

Initially, his paintings were in an abstract manner very much under the influence of the COBRA (avant-garde movement) movement; he has even been called a Neo-cobra painter. His stay in Argentina (1973–1977) saw a radical change in his work. He has since been noted for his liberal and skillful use of vivid and contrasted colours and his enigmatic figures drawn without perspective at various scales and on various planes, sometimes emerging from a layer of paint beneath another one. In his "recouvrements" series, he sometimes even covered older works with thick layers of black paint.

In his recent paintings he has used lighter colours, and the figures are less numerous.

Plessier has also made a series of drawings in homage to Gabriel García Márquez, and a portrait on wood of the author.

== Main collective exhibitions ==
- 1969: Centre international d’études pédagogiques, Sèvres
- 1978: Dessins et sculptures, Saint Rémi de Chevreuse
- 1981: Galerie de l’œil de bœuf, Paris
- 1982: Espace Latino-américain, Paris
- 1984: 92 du 92, Centre culturel de Boulogne Billancourt
- 1985: Salon Mac 2000, Paris

His work has also been shown in Paris at the Salons de Mai, Jeune peinture in Montrouge and Figuration critique.

== Main personal exhibitions ==
- 1974,1976: Galerie Nice, Buenos Aires
- 1978: Galerie du centre, Paris
- 1982: Hommage à Gabriel Garcia Marquez, Centre culturel du Mexique, Paris
- 1982: Galerie Georges Lavrov, Paris
- 1984: La Galerie, Limoges
- 1985: A voir et à manger, Les trois limousins, Paris
- 1985: Galerie Alberto Elia, Buenos Aires

== Bibliography ==
- Macondotierra ou l’anniversaire de la solitude, variations graphiques en forme d’hommage à Gabriel Garcia Marquez, dessins de Claude Plessier, texte d’Alicia Dujovne Ortiz. [Paris], Éditions Polygraphie, « Empreinte » n° 19, 1982, n.p., épuisé.
