= Ernest Breton =

French artist and archaeologist

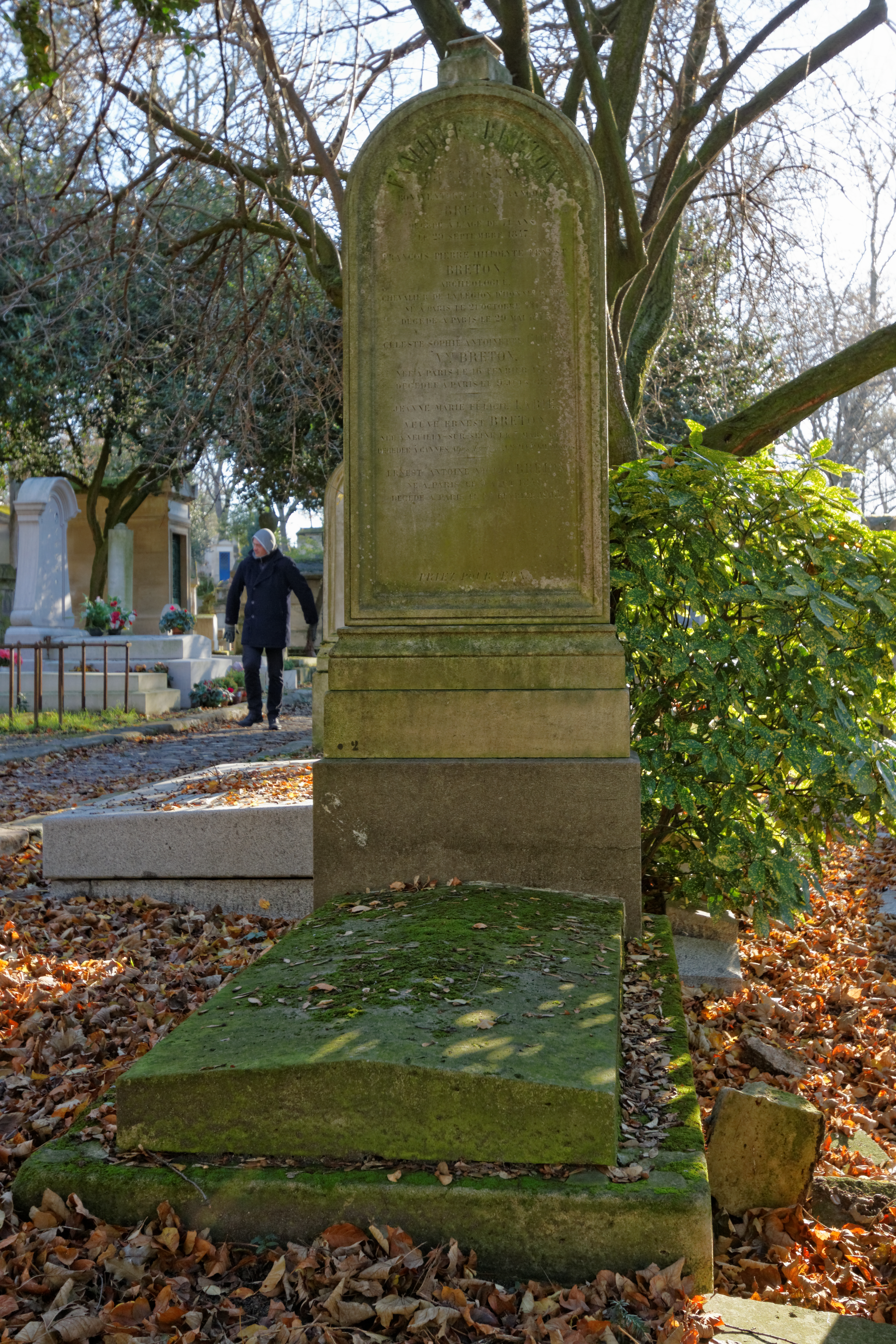
Père Lachaise Cemetery.

François Pierre Hippolyte Ernest Breton, a French artist and archaeologist, was born in Paris in 1812. He studied under Regnier, Watelet, and Champin, and exhibited some landscapes at the Salon. He contributed to Gailhabaud's 'Monuments anciens et modernes,' and in 1843 published 'Monuments de tous les Peuples.' His latest works were 'Pompeia,' 1855; 'Athènes,' 1861; and 'L'Alhambra,' 1873. He died in Paris in 1875.
