= Louis Bissinger =

French painter

Louis Bissinger was a French painter born in Lyon on 24 April 1899. He died on February 25, 1978, in Rillieux-la-Pape.

== Biography ==
Louis Bissinger began his career as a musician, playing the cello to make a living. He moved to painting and started with watercolors. He was arrested by the Gestapo in 1943 for helping the French Resistance, and was deported to Germany. He used his painting skills to illustrate the atrocities of concentration camp life in Buchenwald. He survived and organized an exhibition of his war time's artworks when he returned to France.

== External Sources and References ==
- Benezit Dictionary of Artists
