= Olivier Masmonteil =

French painter

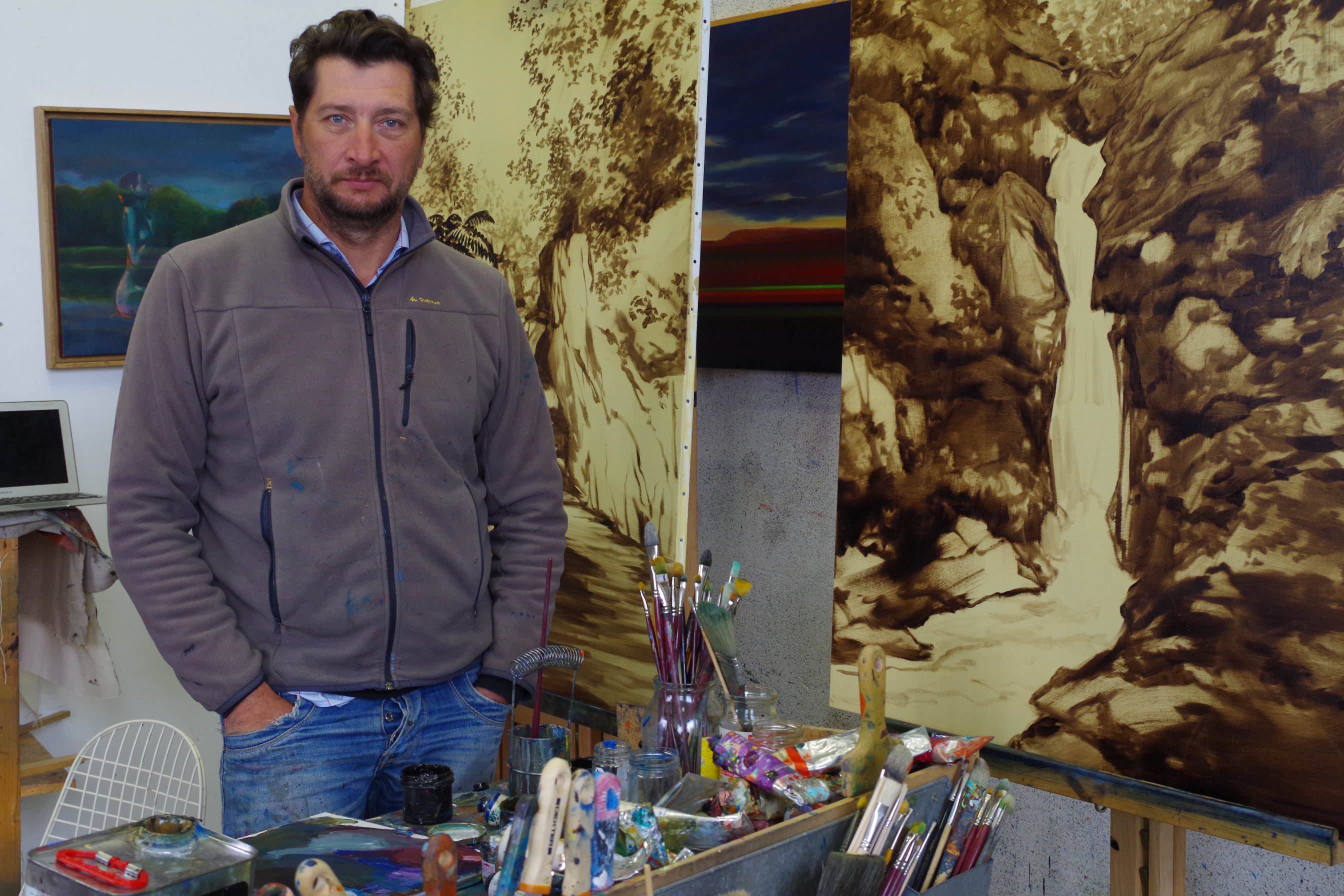
- Olivier Masmonteil in his Paris studio in 2019 - by Frédéric Elin
- Born: 1973 (age 52–53); Romilly-sur-Seine, France
- Known for: Painting
- Website: www.oliviermasmonteil.com

Olivier Masmonteil (born September 23, 1973, Romilly-sur-Seine, France) is a French artist.

== Education and Career ==
He studied at the École des Beaux-Arts de Bordeaux from 1996 to 1999. As a painter, Olivier Masmonteil dedicates his work exclusively to landscapes. While offering a variety of treatment, the paintings of Olivier Masmonteil assume a thematic unity which the landscape is both the substance and form, subject and object, the content and container. Globetrotter artist, he has started a second world tour in Asia (India, Thailand, Vietnam) and South America (Chile, Brazil).

== Selected works ==
- Tempête à Giverny, 2011, oil on canvas, 89 x 116 cm
- La Dordogne, 2010, Acrylic on canvas, 180 x 270 cm (French Ministry of Foreign Affairs collection)
- Cascade Argentine, 2010, Acrylic and oil on canvas, 235 x 240 cm (Fondation Eileen S. Kaminsky Family collection)
- Routes du monde, 2009, Acrylic on canvas, 27 x 35 cm each (Fondation Colas collection)
- Augenweide XVI, 2004, oil on canvas, 250 x 280.5 cm (FNAC collection)

== Exhibitions ==
=== Solo exhibitions (selection) ===
2020:

- Serial Colors, L’Artothèque, Caen (à venir)
- Horizons so big, Suquet des artistes, Pôle d'art moderne et contemporain de Cannes
- The veil erased, Galerie Thomas Bernard - Cortex Athletico, Paris

2019:

- Countryside, Galerie Thomas Bernard - Cortex Athletico, Paris

2018:

- The space of metamorphoses, Cité des Arts, Chambéry

2017:

- From Gimel to Ushuaia, château de Sédières, Clergoux (Corrèze)

2016:

- Portrait, Galerie Dukan, Saint Ouen

2015:

- LE put in Diane, Patio Art Opera, Paris

2014:

- A week and a day in Prague/ A week and a day in Prague, Dvorak Sec Contemporary Gallery, Prague
- Courtesans, Galerie D.X, Bordeaux
- The memory of the past, Galerie Dukan, Paris

2012:

- Place, La Galerie du Nouvel-Ontario, Ontario, Canada
- Olivier Masmonteil, Galerie du CAUE, Limoges, France

2011:

- Walden ou la vie dans les bois, Galerie Domi Nostrae, Lyon, France

2010:

- The long and winding road, Galerie Dukan&Hourdequin, Marseille, France
- Quelle que soit la minute de jour, Chapelle de la Visitation, Thonon-les-Bains, France

2007:

- Olivier Masmonteil, Klare Ferne, French Institute, Berlin, Germany

2006:

- Pêcher l’eau, Galerie Suzanne Tarasiève, Paris, France

2005:

- Olivier Masmonteil, Augenweide, Michael Schultz Gallery, Berlin, Germany

=== Group exhibitions (selection) ===
2012:

- Plaisirs de France, curated by Philippe Costamagna, Baku, Azerbaijan and Almaty, Kazakhstan

2011:

- A Glimpse at French Contemporary Painting, Galeria Tap Seac, Macao, China
- Des paysages, des figures. Carte blanche à Olivier Masmonteil, Le Château de Saint-Ouen, Saint-Ouen, France

2010:

- Collection 3, Fondation pour l’art contemporain Claudine et Jean-Marc Salomon, Alex, France

2008:

- Délicatesse des couleurs, Hangar 7, Salzburg, Germany

2007:

- Peinture: Génération 70, Fondation pour l’art contemporain Claudine et Jean-Marc Salomon, Alex, France

2004:

- Climats, cyclothymie des paysages, Centre national d’art et du paysage, Vassivière-en-Limousin, France

== Awards, grants and residencies (selection) ==
2005-2006:

- Residency Spinnerei, Leipzig, Germany

2002-2003:

- Residency La Source-Villarceaux, France

2002

- Painting Prize, Fondation Coffim, France

== Collections ==
- FRAC (Regional Contemporary Art Funds) Haute-Normandie, France
- French Ministry of Foreign Affairs, Paris, France
- Eileen S. Kaminsky Family Foundation, New York, USA
- Claudine and Jean-Marc Salomon Foundation, France
- Colas Foundation, France
- FNAC (National Contemporary Art Fund), France
- FRAC (Regional Contemporary Art Funds) Alsace, France
