= Henri-Julien Dumont =

French painter

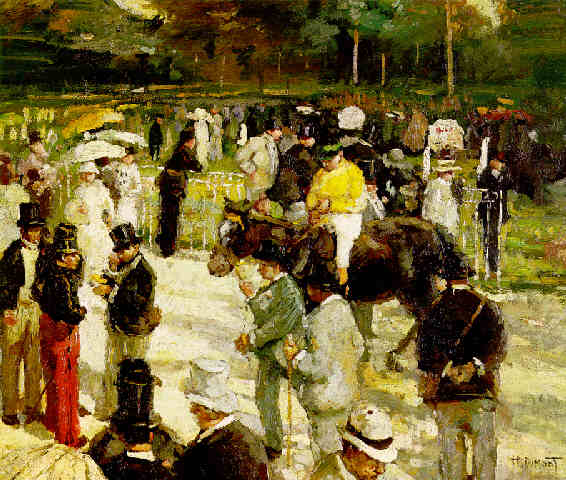
Henri Julien Dumont, At the races, oil on canvas laid on panel, 50,8 x 61 cm

Henri-Julien Dumont (1859—1921) was a French impressionist painter, born in Beauvais, Oise. His works were exhibited at the Salon and the Société des Artistes Indépendants. Henri-Julien Dumont's paintings were rewarded in 1900 with a bronze medal at the Universal exhibition.
