= Albert Joseph Pénot =

French painter

- Born: 28 February 1862; France
- Died: 16 October 1930 (aged 68)
- Education: Société des Artistes Français
- Known for: Painting

Albert Joseph Pénot (English: /peɪˈnoʊ/ pay-NOH, French: [albɛʁ ʒozɛf peno]; 28 February 1862 – 16 October 1930) was a French painter known for female nudes and landscapes. Today, he is more popularly and specifically recognized for a subset of paintings centering on women of darker, more macabre themes.

In 2018, his "La femme chauve-souris" was sold for £137,500.

== Styles and themes ==
Pénot was concerned first and foremost with anatomically accurate portrayals of women. Singular female forms were the implicit focus of his work, whereas the worlds surrounding his characters are rarely realized beyond misty atmospheres and patches of shadow and light. Environments are incidental and are typically shrouded in haze, giving the figures themselves explicit priority. However, Pénot was more versatile in his artistry, and was not confined exclusively to female nudes: church figures were another of his subjects, in addition to occasional compositions depicting scenes of men and women from high society in narratives framed by more conventional settings.

== Gallery ==
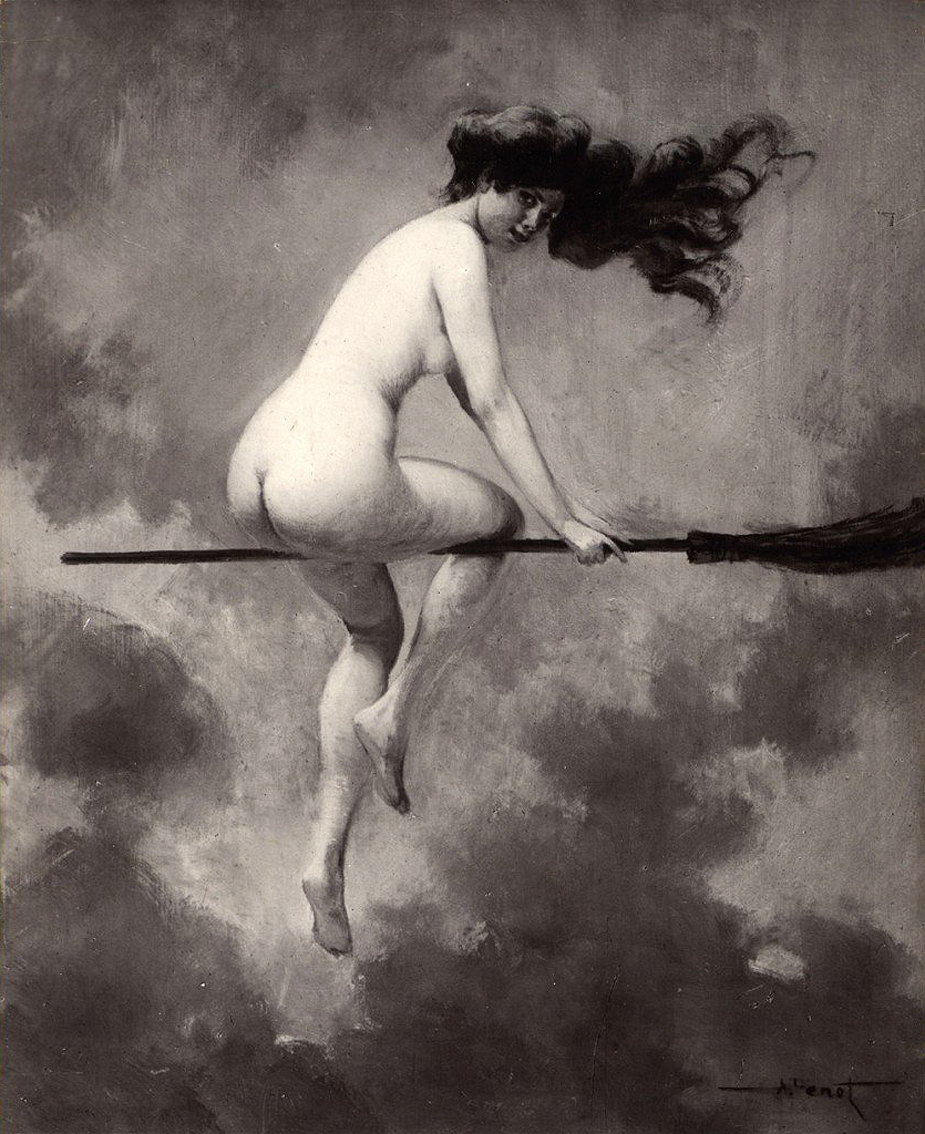
Départ pour le Sabbat by Albert Joseph Pénot (1910)

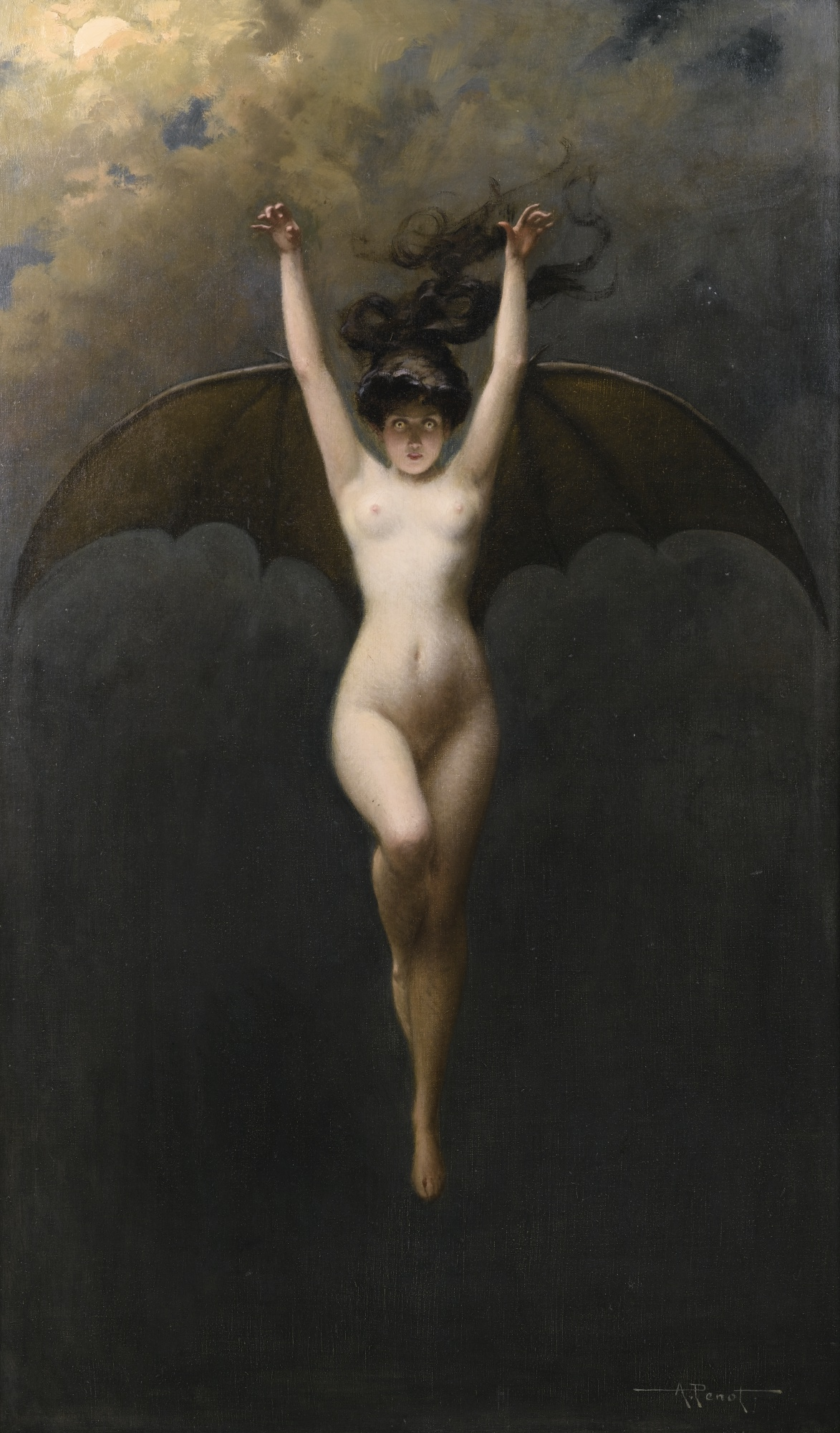
La Femme Chauve-Souris (c.1890)

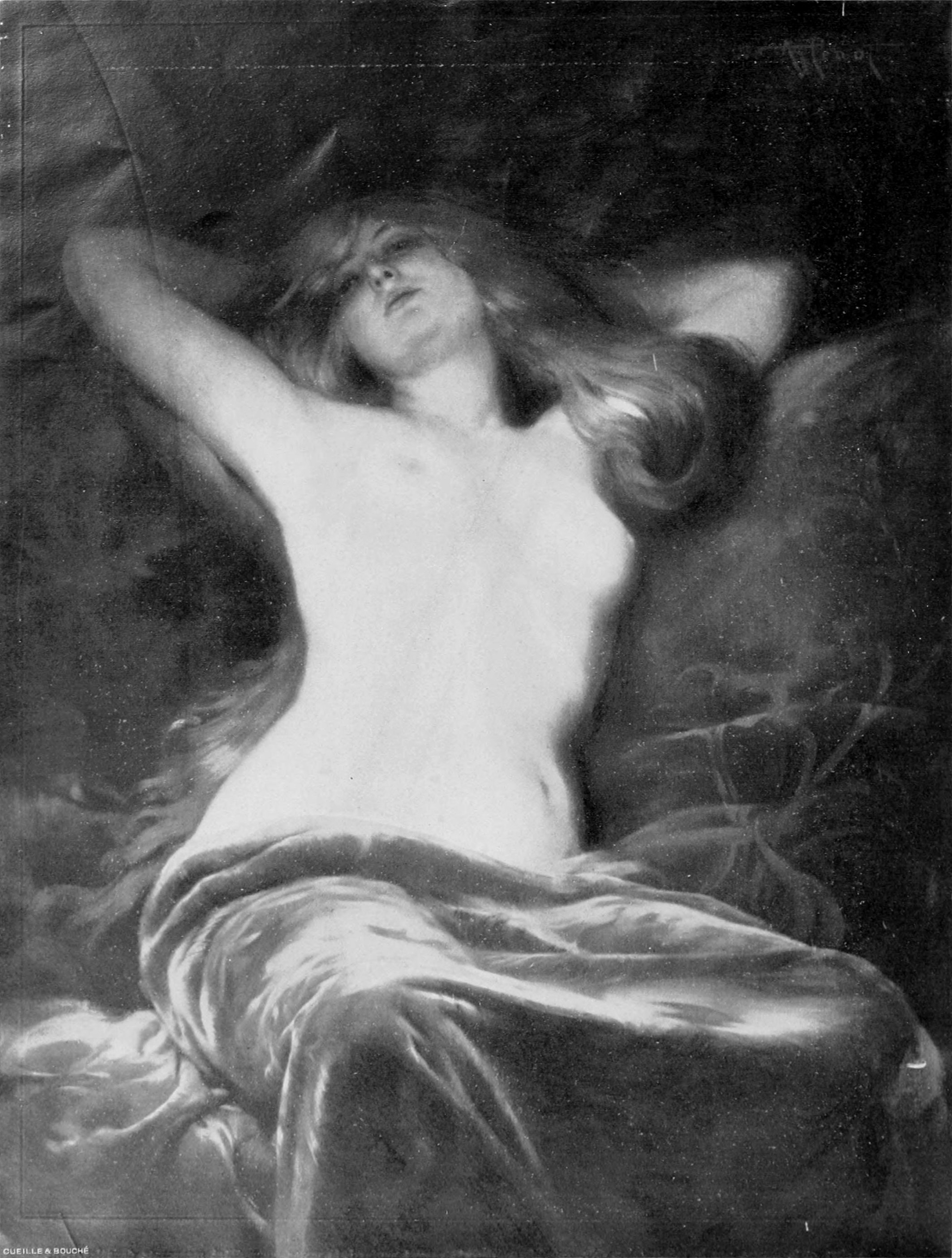
Abandon

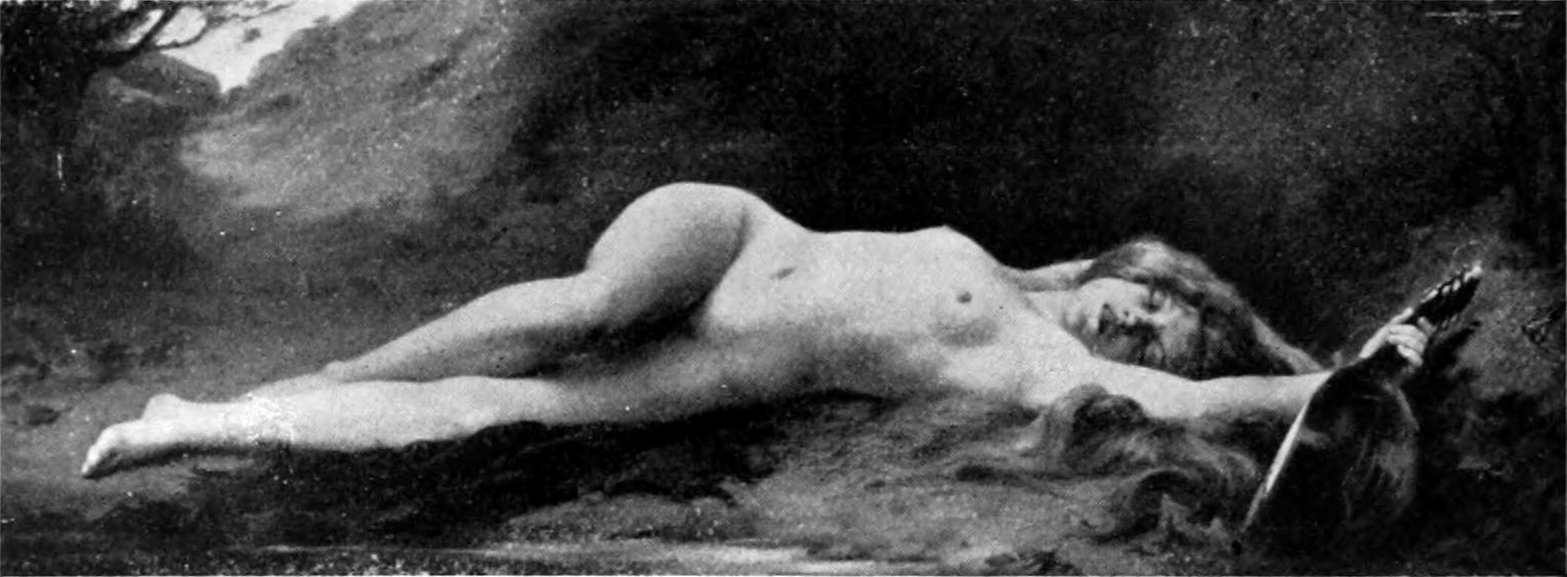
Automne

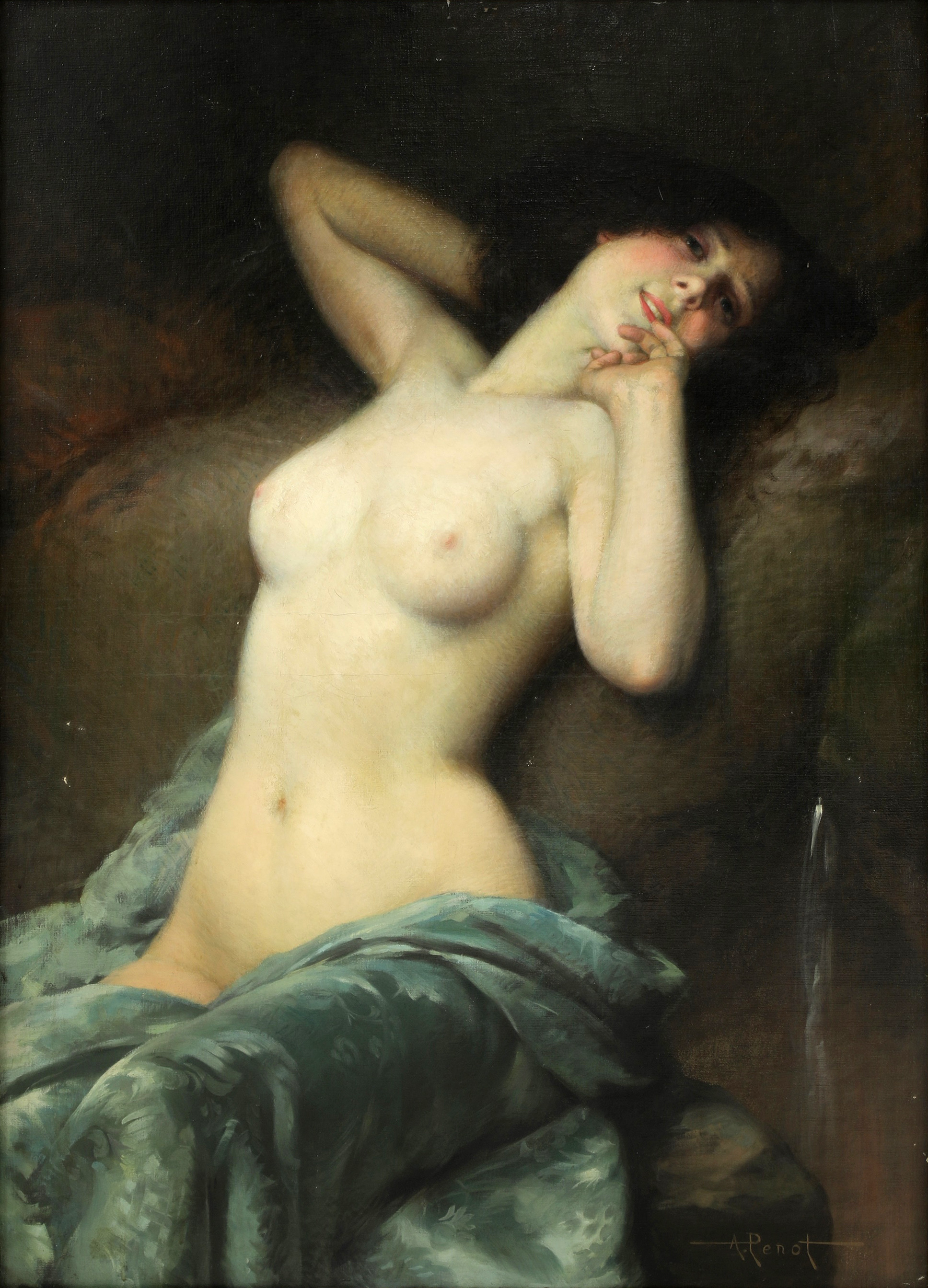
A reclining nude
