= Pierre Le Tellier =

French painter

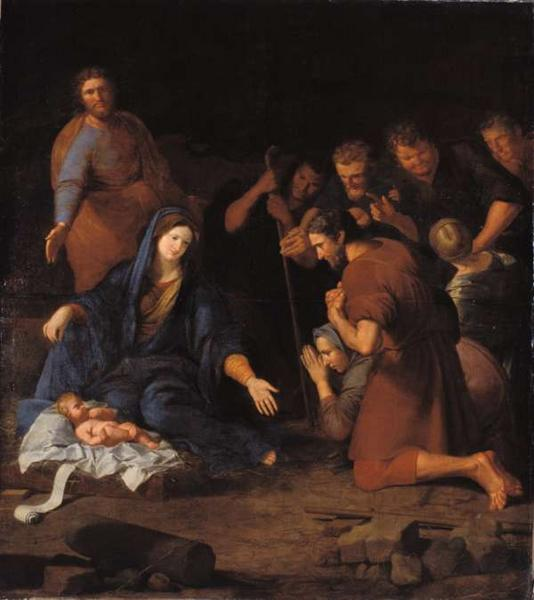
Adoration of the Shepherds

Pierre Le Tellier (1614, Vernon – c. 1702, Rouen) was a French painter. Nephew and student of Poussin, Pierre Le Tellier spent 14 years at his side in Rome.

He painted many paintings distinguished for their simplicity of composition, six of which are now in the Musée des Beaux-Arts de Rouen – Vision de saint Bernard, Apparition de Jésus à saint Pierre, Siméon et l’enfant Jésus, Le repos en Égypte, Saint Joseph et l’enfant Jésus, Trois anges, Jésus et saint Pierre, Christ mort, Notre Dame du rosaire and Les pèlerins d’Emmaüs.

== Sources ==
- Philippe de Chennevières, Recherches sur la vie et les ouvrages de quelques peintres provinciaux de l'ancienne France, Paris, Dumoulin, 1847–1862
