= Maurice Moisset =

French painter (1860–1946)

Maurice Moisset (1860–1946) was a French marine and landscape painter. Maurice Moisset was a pupil of Jules Lefebvre and Dameron, and member of the Society of French Artists since 1888.

In 1924 he was appointed Peintre Officiel de la Marine (POM), which is the official designation of a marine painter of the French Navy with the rank of a naval officer.

From 1942 to 1946 he was the president of Foundation Taylor, a French association of painters, architects and other artists.

== Paintings ==
Moisset painted many different landscapes, but was especially drawn towards the light before and after sunset.

https://web.archive.org/web/20120417114254/http://www.netmarine.net/tradi/pom/textes/listepomdcd.pdf http://www.taylor.fr/accPresentation.php

Literature: https://books.google.dk/books/about/Atelier_du_peintre_Maurice_Moisset_2e_ve.html?id=T2zPMgAACAAJ&redir_esc=y
