= Raymond Rochette =

French painter

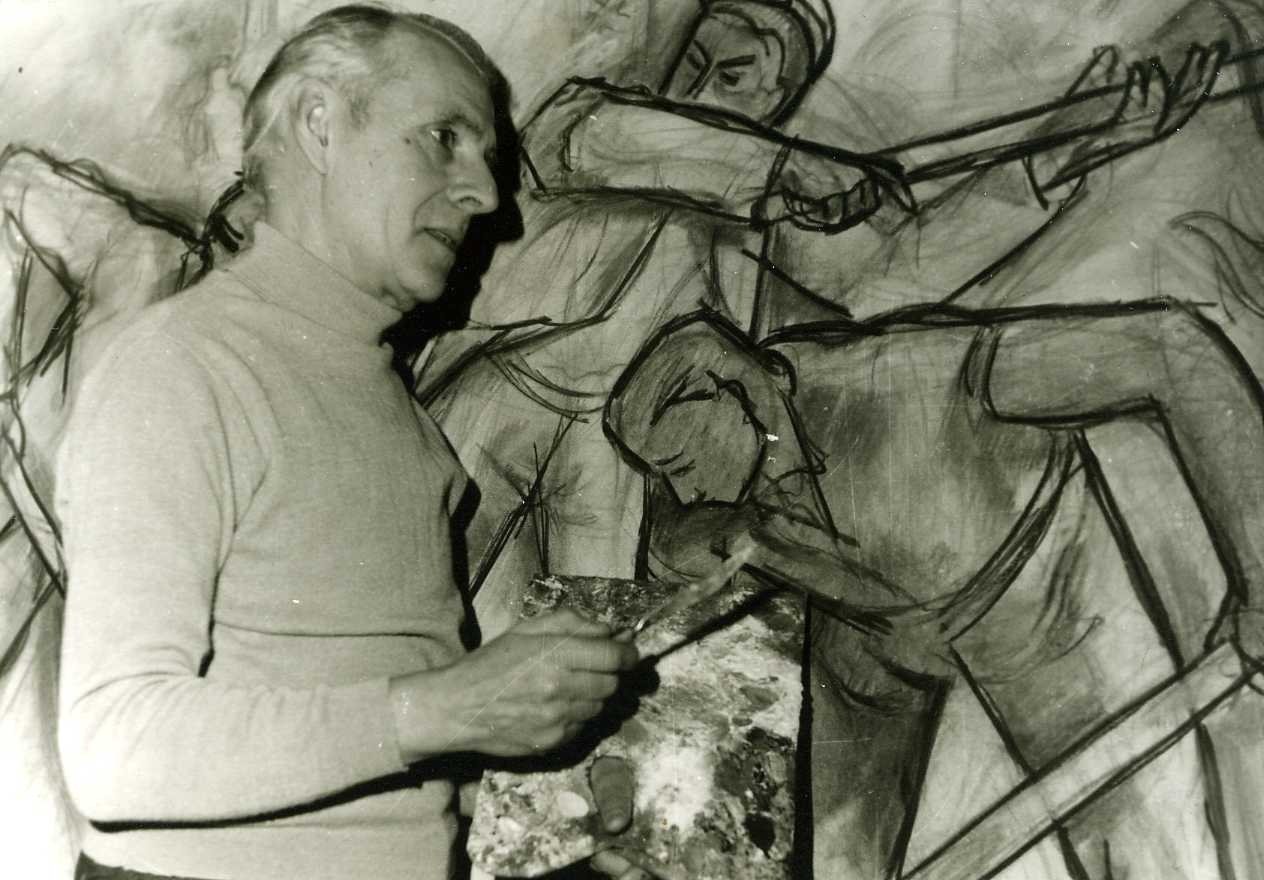
- Born: 25 May 1906; Le Creusot
- Died: 26 December 1993 (aged 87); Le Creusot
- Known for: Autodidacte
- Notable work: Les marteaux pilons, Les cheminées, Usinage

Raymond Rochette (May 25, 1906 – December 26, 1993) was a French painter.

== Biography ==
He was born in La Marolle, in the house of his family, which had been built by his grandfather. This house is strangely located between the big factory of Le Creusot and the wide forest of the Morvan area. In 1921, Raymond Rochette made his first oil paintings, showing landscapes of Morvan and scenes of life in the countryside: people working in the fields, working the wood, exploiting quarries, etc., subjects which would always interest him. As a child, Raymond Rochette was already fascinated by heavy metallurgy. In Morocco, where he did his military service, he writes to his family: “I think that painting men working, sweating, reddened, with the enormous machines, dust and steam, would be interesting.”

In 1936, he asked for an authorization to paint the workshops of the factory, in vain. During a dozen years, he painted many landscapes in which the factory can be seen in the background. In 1949, he was eventually allowed to come into the factory and to paint there. His first paintings focus on the giant tools of heavy metallurgy, but later he painted more and more often workers, who are shown in the center of the picture or just beside the big machines they dominate and that make them look tiny.

During 70 years, Raymond Rochette's thirst for painting remains insatiable. A landscape, a face, a piece of fruit, ordinary objects, everything he sees fascinates him.

He died in the house where he was born.

Today his paintings can be seen in a dozen museums in France and in other countries.

« I like machines just like one can like the fountains of Provence. Workshops remind me the naves of the cathedrals, and their glows make me think about the evening feasts on the Grand Canal. The gestures of the dancers of the opera are not more beautiful than those of the workers. When Le Lorrain was painting his palaces, his joy was not purer than the one I feel when I am drawing workshops. The abundance of monumental metallic structures makes me feel the joy of Le Piranèse, a joy that I taste when I am magnifying welders and grinder- or rolling mill-operators, who become in my paintings the magicians of the bright forest of heavy metallurgy.” Raymond Rochette's diary

== Museums ==
- Les Romanichels - Musée des Beaux Arts de Dijon. (1937)
- Hiver au Creusot - Collection de la Ville de Paris. (1951)
- Les laminoirs - Musée de Saint–Étienne. (1953)
- Le Blooming - Musée de Chalon-sur-Saône. (1953)
- Les cheminées - Collection de l’Etat. (1953)
- L’équipe de relève - Musée de Saint-Denis. (1954)
- Les marteaux pilons - Collection de la Ville de Paris. (1955)
- Usinage - Collection de l’Etat. (1955)
- L’oiseau - Musée des Beaux Arts de Dijon. (1965)
- Le théâtre romain - Musée Rolin, Autun. (1984)
- Les pelleteurs (fusain) et les pelleteurs (huile) – Ecomusée Le Creusot - Montceau. (2007)

== Bibliography ==
Books:

- Raymond Rochette, un peintre de son temps, Michel Rérolle, Ed. Art et Poésie. 1969
- Rochette, F.Jondot et F.Roche, Ed. de Larc. 1981
- Raymond Rochette, dessins. Ed. de l’écomusée de la C. U. le Creusot- Montceau. 1997

Magazines :

- Vents du Morvan, été 2005 : « Raymond Rochette, de la terre à l’usine »
- Bourgogne Magazine, juin 2006 : « Voir l’usine en peinture »
- Musée des arts et métiers, la revue, numéro spécial, octobre 2006 : « Les peintres et la technique, regards croisés »

== Links ==
- (in French) Raymond Rochette website
- (in French) Website of Le Creusot
- (in French) Famous French painters list fr:Liste de peintres français
- (in French) Important people from Burgundy fr:Bourgogne
