= Roger de la Corbière =

French painter

Roger de La Corbière (22 July 1893, Vouneuil-sur-Vienne - 3 September 1974, Paris) was a French painter, best known for his seascapes. He worked primarily in watercolor, and is noted for his portrayals of the interaction between light and water.
