= Louis Braquaval =

French painter (1854–1919)

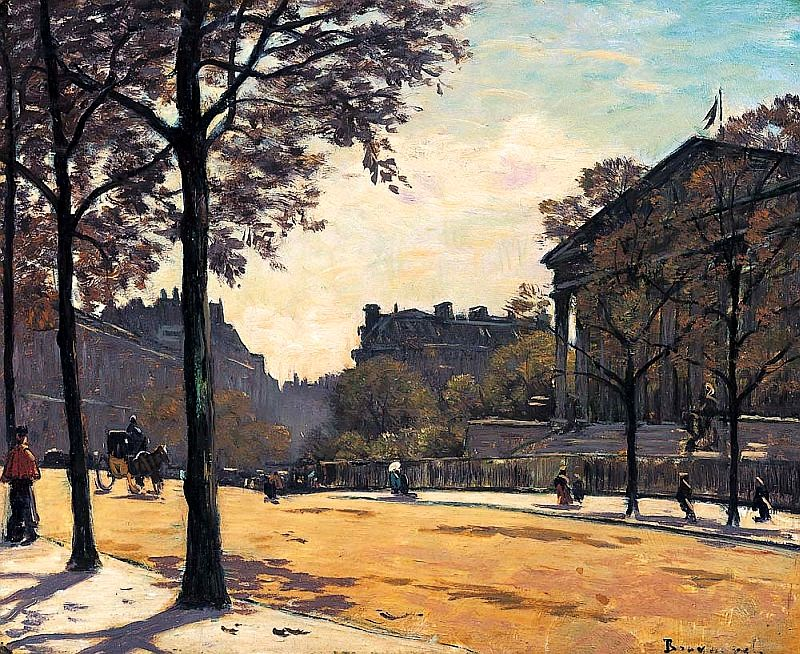
Street in Front of La Madeleine (c.1910)

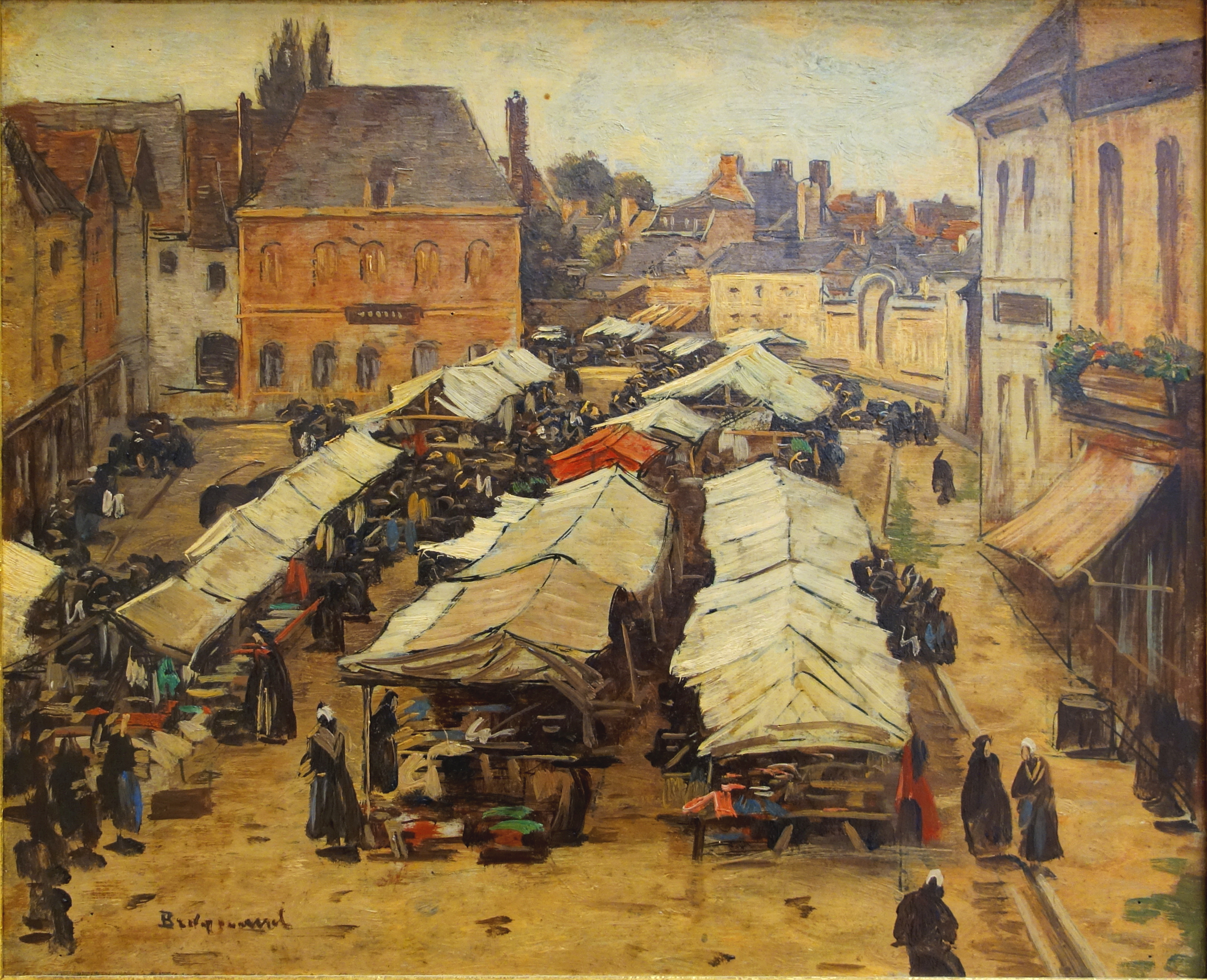
The Marketplace in Abbeville (c.1900)

Louis Édouard Joseph Braquaval (24 October 1854 – 19 November 1919) was a French landscape and cityscape painter.

== Biography ==
He was born in Lille into a family of wealthy industrialists and later married into another wealthy family. Originally, he established himself as an auctioneer, but his artistic sensibilities soon proved to be greater than his business sense. Thanks to the support of his father-in-law, he was able to pursue his interest in art and study with Eugène Boudin, a family friend, who had to start from scratch as Braquaval had not even been taught how to draw when he was a child.

In 1895, he bought a house in Saint-Valéry-sur-Somme, a popular area for painters at that time. Among those whose acquaintance he made was Edgar Degas, who became his good friend and painting companion.

He did not begin exhibiting until 1907, when he showed some landscapes at the Salon. Later, in 1909 and 1910, he also exhibited at the Salon d'Automne and returned to the Paris Salon four years after that. Mostly, however, he established his reputation at regional exhibitions in Arras, Lille and Nantes. He became a Chevalier in the Légion d'honneur in 1914.

By this time, he was in fragile health and painted little; not only for that reason, but also because of the chaos caused by the war. He died in Saint-Valéry-sur-Somme on 19 November 1919. His work was largely forgotten until a fiftieth anniversary retrospective was held at the Kaplan Gallery in London.
