= Anne-Louise Le Jeuneux =

French artist (died 1794)

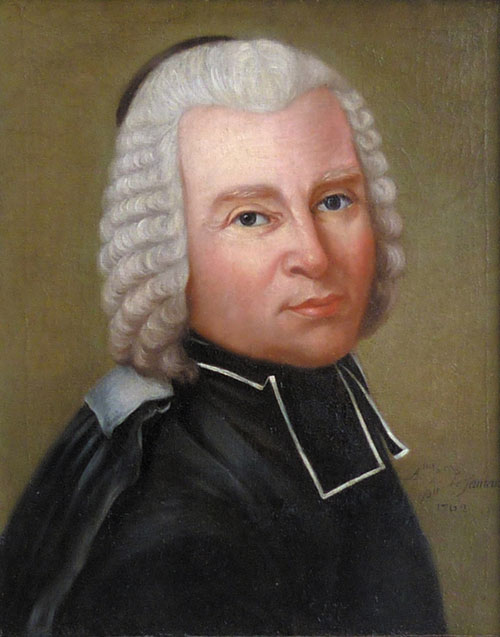
Portrait of Nicolas-Louis de Lacaille by Anne-Louise Le Jeuneux, 1762

Anne-Louise Le Jeuneux, sometimes Lejeuneux or Jeuneux, later Baudin de La Chesnaye (died 15 April 1794) was a French painter.

Le Jeuneux is first recorded in 1755, when she produced a map of the night sky over the southern hemisphere for the astronomer Nicolas-Louis de Lacaille, after his drawing; this is today in the collection of the Paris Observatory. She also painted his portrait in 1762. The two were evidently close, for he asked after her in a number of his letters home from his expedition to Africa. She was the daughter or sister of a M. Le Jeuneux who kept a cabinet of curiosities at the Hôtel de Chavigny and was acquainted with Benjamin Franklin. Le Jeuneux produced a number of portraits in oils, as well as at least one pastel, dated 1763. She is known to have held a salon. She married André Baudin de La Chesnaye, sometimes Chenaye (1732–1792), a former mousquetaire, chevalier de Saint-Louis, and later commander of the Paris national guard who was among those massacred at the La Force Prison in 1792. Anne-Louise drowned herself in the Seine two years later, upon the decree of the Banishment of Nobles by the Committee of Public Safety.
