= Amar Ben Belgacem =

French-Tunisian painter (1979–2010)

- Born: June 18, 1979; Paris, France
- Died: August 24, 2010 (aged 31); Paris, France
- Occupation: Painter

Amar Ben Belgacem (June 18, 1979 – August 24, 2010) was a French-born Tunisian self-taught painter.

== Biography ==
Born to Tunisian parents, Amar Ben Belgacem grew up in France until he was 5. In 1984, his parents decided to return to Tunisia, taking Belgacem and his twin brother with them. Until he was 19 years old, he lived in a villa which he described as "artistic" because it contains an exotic garden, many paintings, collection of objects, arts books, and other arts-related items.

A self-taught painter, his works are represented in public and private collections in twenty countries.

On August 2, 2006, he was made named an officer of merit of the Tunisian culture by the minister of culture and patrimony. He was a member of the International association of plastic arts, the European association for plastic arts, the international academy of Lutèce, the union of Tunisian plastic artists, and the association of the plastic artists of Hammamet. He died in 2010 in Paris.

== Exhibitions ==
2008

- International exhibition (Artists from 72 countries) Valletta, Malta.
- Personal exhibition at the D Gallery of Turin, Italy

2007

- Personal exhibition at the Medina gallery, Tunis.
- Trophy of Convergences Club, Lyon. France.

2006

- Personal exhibition at the Embassy of Tunisia, Washington, D.C., USA.
- Personal exhibition at the Yahia Gallery, Tunis.

2005

- Personal exhibition at the L'ARTicle Galerie of Paris.
- Personal exhibition at the French cultural center in Sana’a, Republic of Yemen.

2004

- Gift of paintings to the public library of Hammamet.
- Exhibition at the Arabe world institut in Paris in connection with Week of Events Devoted to Tunisia.

2003

- Personal exhibition at the A Part Gallery of Paris.
- Personal exhibition at the ANDALUCIA Gallery of Rades in Tunisia.

2002

- Amar included in Who's Who in International Art for 2002, together with a reproduction of one of his works.
- Personal exhibition at the A Part Gallery of Paris.

2001

- Series of post cards published for «WHO'S WHO ART».

2000

- Gift of paintings to the French media center "Les Mureaux".

1999

- Bronze medal from ELITE.
- Exhibition at the Unesco, Beirut, Lebanon.

1998

- Exhibition at the Palazzo Parisio, Naxxar, Malta.
- Gift of medals to the museum of the Legion of Honor in Paris.

1997

- Gift of one painting to the City of Hammamet and two others to the Tunisian Association of Youth Hostels, in celebration of the national day of culture.
- Joint exhibition at the international cultural center of Hammamet.

1996

- Several exhibitions in tourist centers of Hammamet, including the following hotels: EL FEL, PARADISE GARDEN, ALBATROS, MANAR, KACEM, ZENINTH.
- Gift of two paintings to the international cultural center in Hammament.

1995

- Personal exhibition at the youth center of Hammamet.

1994

- Founding member of the newspaper «EL AKLAM», supervisor of cultural services.

1993

- Personal exhibition at the studio, Hammamet.
