= Wang Yan Cheng =

Chinese painter (born 1960)

Wang Yan Cheng (王衍成, sometime wrote 王衍城) is a Chinese painter born January 9, 1960, in Guangdong province, living and working in France.

== Biography ==
Wang Yan Cheng was born in Guangdong province, China in 1960. He graduated from the Shandong Institute of Fine Arts in Yantai in 1985; he then studied in the Chinese Central Institute of Fine Arts between 1986 and 1988; Wang Yan Chen then moved to France to complete his studies at the Saint-Etienne Plastic Arts University, from 1990 to 1992.

In 2021, he was awarded the Correspondence of the National Academy of Arts of Italy, the National Michelangelo Medal in 2020, the Italian Berry Art Prize in 2019, He has won the Commander Medal of French Arts and Literature in 2015, the Legion of Honour in 2013, at the meantime, he serves as president of Fonds De Dotation Des Beaux-Arts De Wyc, vice president of Salon Comparaisons, vice president of IACA International Art Center. Wang Yan Cheng is a member of AIAP UNESCO, he serves as a visiting professor of Accademia di Belle Arti di Roma and Shandong University of Arts, in addition, he is a master's supervisor while he is distinguished professor of UAA.

Since 1993, he has held more than 50 solo exhibitions, up to 100 joint exhibitions in the meanwhile. He works with major galleries such as Galerie Lelong & Co. (France), Galerie Louis Carré (France), Acquavella Galleries(USA).

The artist has decorated the Beijing Opera with a giant artwork in 2007. In 2006, he was named Chevalier des Arts et des Lettres by the French Government.

== Decorations ==
- Academician of Florence Academy of Fine Arts (2023）
- Academician of Florence Academy of Arts (2022）
- Medal of Michelangelo Buonarroti (2020）
- Commander of the Order of Arts and Letters (2015)
- Legion of French Arts and Literature (2013)
- Chevalier of French Arts and Literature (2006)

== Bibliography ==
- Wang Yan Cheng, Lydia Harambourg et Dong Qiang, Cercle d'Art, 2010
