= Charles Léon Godeby =

French painter

Charles Léon Godeby (26 January 1866, in Rennes – 1952 in Quimper), was a French painter who painted scenes in Brittany and North Africa.

== Biography ==
A pupil of Jean-Léon Gérôme and Luc-Olivier Merson, he exhibited at the Paris Salon from 1890 onwards. He was also Director of Quimper's Musée des beaux-arts from 1922. He was commissioned to decorate the Quimper Mairie's "escalier d'honneur" with two triptychs, one depicting scenes from the battlefield and the trenches and the other representing the sacrifice made by the soldiers from Quimper. 566 men from Quimper gave their lives in the Great War. This memorial was inaugurated on 27 May 1928 and restored in 2011.

== Works ==
Some of Godeby's paintings are:-

- "Paysages bretons":
- "Ferme bretonne" or "Le retour, fin de journée"), 1904. Oil on canvas. Held by Bordeaux' Musée des beaux-arts.
- "Le pardon de Sainte-Anne-la-Palud"' . An 1887 oil on canvas painting held in the Musée du Vieux-Château in Laval
- "Devant l'église en Bretagne"
- "Paysan breton à l'aube". An oil on canvas.
- "Lavandières près de l'église"
- "Les lavandières",
- "Douarnenez Les Plomarc'h". Oil on canvas
- "Environs de Douarnenez". An oil on canvas.
- "Le port de Douarnenez vu des chaumières des Plomarc'h". Oil on canvas.
- "Gouézec, Notre-Dame des Trois Fontaines", Oil on canvas.
- "Jour de pardon au pays Bigouden".Oil on canvas.
- "La marchande de jouets". Painting held in the Quimper Musée des beaux-arts.
- "Famille bretonne : quatre personnages"
- "La petite bretonne à la poupée"
- "Pont-Croix"
- "Maisons en bord de côte bretonne"
- "La chapelle du Tromeur"
- "Châteaulin : les bords de l'Aulne"
- "Automne à Scaër"
- "Paysage du Morbihan"
- "Paysages d'Afrique du Nord"
- "Ruelle orientale". An oil on canvas.
- "Souk"
- "Rue de village en Afrique du Nord"
- "Scène animée en Afrique du Nord"
- "Rue couverte en Afrique du Nord"
- "Souk à Constantine"
- "Cimetière à Tunis"
- "Marché aux épices à Kairouan"
- "Minaret à Sfax"
- "Oasis de Gabès".' A 1908 painting exhibited at the Salon of 1908 under the title "L'Oued à Gabès"
- "Rue à Sidi Mansour"
- "Rue à Mila"
- "Tanger"
- "Musulmanes"
- "Homère conduit sous un sycomore par un jeune", 1893
- "L'adoration des bergers". An 1897 oil on canvas held by the Rennes Musée des beaux-arts
- "Dans le vieux chemin". A 1909 oil on canvas. Held by the Rennes Musée des beaux-arts .
- "Jeune fille avec une cruche d'eau"
- "Bassin dans le parc de Trianon",
- "Le buisson ardent"
- "Pont à Venise"
- "Palais et pont à Venise"
- "Les camélias"
