= Alfred Swieykowski =

French painter (1869–1953)

Alfred Swieykowski (1869–1953) was a French painter of Russo-Polish descent. He studied under Fernand Cormon and Paulin Bertrand in Paris. He exhibited at the Salon des Artistes Francais (1894–1921), receiving an award in 1896 and another for the Exposition Universelle in Paris in 1900. He became member of the Société Nationale des Beaux-Arts and exhibited at its Salon from 1926 to 1943. He sat in the jury of the Société Nationale des Beaux-Arts in 1927 and won a silver medal in 1937 at the Exposition Internationale.

Post-Impressionist, throughout his life he adopted at first a classic technique then a personal impressionist style, at times bordering on fauvism. He tackled a wide range of subjects but specialised in the landscapes of Paris, Normandy, Brittany and especially the Alps. An Aristocrat, he only signed the numerous paintings designed for exhibition, and often either exchanged or gave away his work so he was quite unknown in the art world. The 'Association des Amis d'Alfred Swieykowski' was formed in 2004, a non-profit group that locates and exhibits his paintings. Some 600 have been found so far.

== Recent exhibitions ==
- 2010 Espace Culturel de la Ferriere-sur-Risle (27) under the 'Normandy Impressionists' Festival.
- 2011 Musee Fournaise (78) ISBN 2-9508154-8-0
- 2012 Musee du Faouet (56) ISBN 978-2-84497-228-6
