= Sotiris René Sidiropoulos =

French painter and sculptor (born 1977)

- Born: 1977 (age 48–49)

Sotiris René Sidiropoulos (born in 1977 in Paris) is a French painter and sculptor.

== Biography ==
His father, iconographe, sculptor, Doctor of Philosophy and former student of Philopoemen Constantinidi or Caracosta and Costas Valsamis, inculcates to him the rudiments of the profession of iconographe and sculptor.

Their first family workshop of iconography and sculpture was created in 1848 in Cappadocia.

In his youth, he was the student of the painters Philopoemen Constantinidi and Zoe Valsamis.

He was the student also of the sculptor Costas Valsamis, (alumnus of Ossip Zadkine). He studied the works of Pablo Picasso which are an inexhaustible source of artistic inspiration. He studied at the Academie de la Grande Chaumière in Paris.
