= Raymond Besse =

French artist (1899–1969)

- Born: 1899; Niort, France
- Died: 1969 (aged 69–70); Candé-sur-Beuvron, France
- Known for: Painter

Raymond Besse (1899–1969) was a French artist.

== Biography ==
Raymond Besse was born in Niort, Deux-Sèvres on December 26, 1899. He spent his childhood in the Berry province of France.

Besse arrived in Paris in 1916. He exhibited for the first time in the Salon des Indépendants in 1923. He then continued to exhibit his works in many other exhibitions and salons, among them the Salon d'Automne. Besse's favorite topic was Paris. He loved to illustrate the life in and around the capital city, especially in the northern areas of Saint-Ouen, Montmartre, Clichy and around the Canal Saint-Martin.

Besse often depicted blue-collar neighborhoods of Paris, frequently under snowy or overcast conditions, which gives many of his works a somber appearance. While this style has led some critics to overlook his paintings, they provide a detailed portrayal of life in the suburbs of Paris during the early 20th century, in contrast to the more colorful and idyllic scenes created by artists such as Édouard Cortès (1882–1969), Antoine Blanchard (1910–1988), and Eugène Galien-Laloue (1854–1941).

The artist painted many landscapes in Normandy, villages in the Yonne area, and landscapes around Moret-sur-Loing. Besse finally moved to the Loire area at the end of his life, and he died in Candé-sur-Beuvron, Loir-et-Cher on March 5, 1969.

== Sources ==
- Dictionnaire des peintres à Montmartre, 640 pages, André Roussard (Editions) Jan 1999, ISBN 978-2-9513601-0-5
