= Café de la Paix =

Parisian café

Coordinates: 48.870782°N 2.331671°E

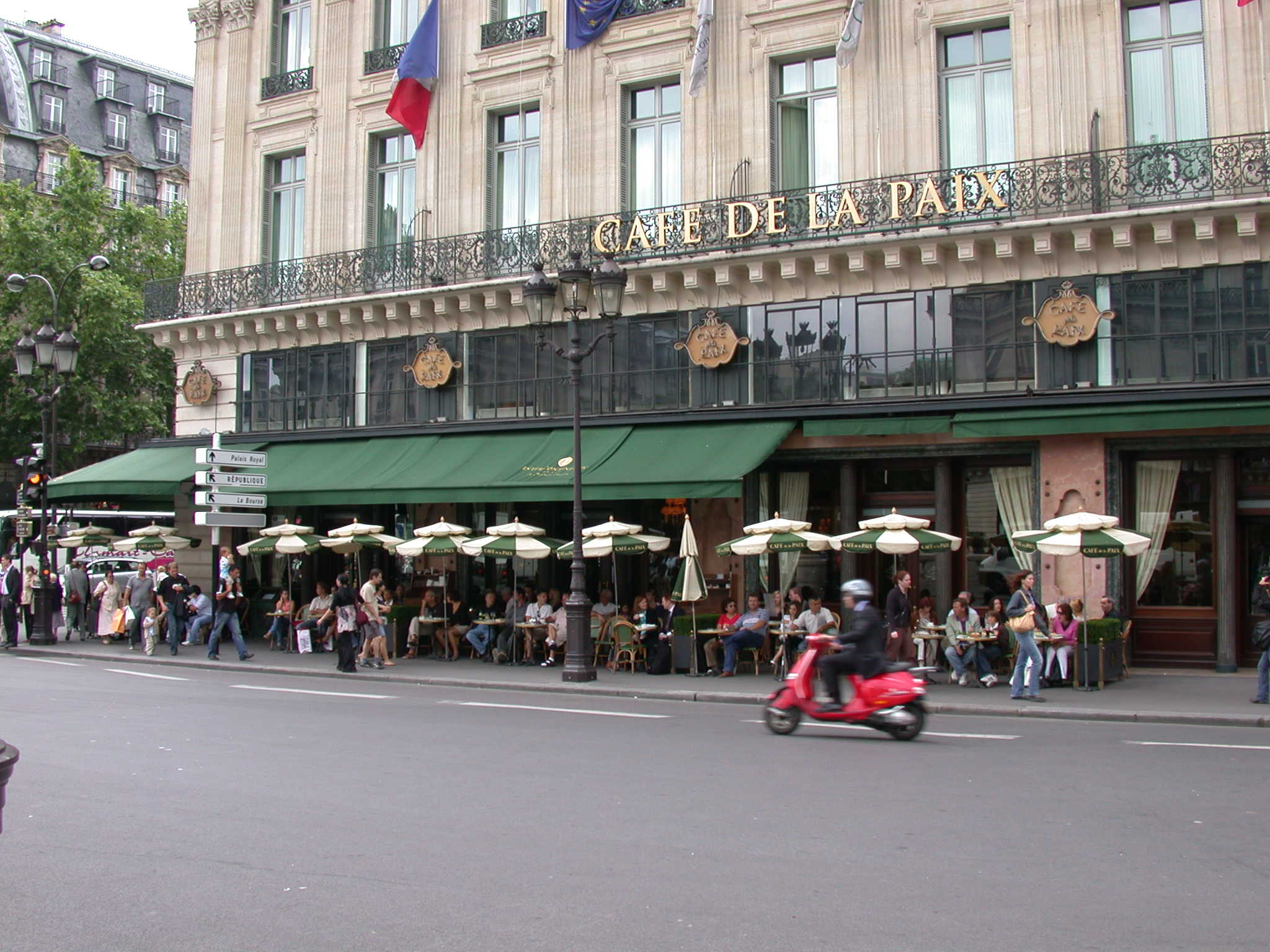
Café de la Paix, Paris

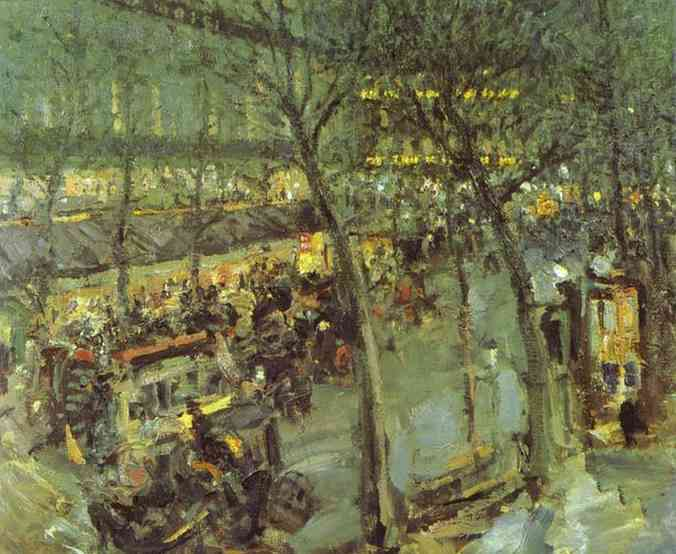
Painting by Konstantin Korovin, 1906

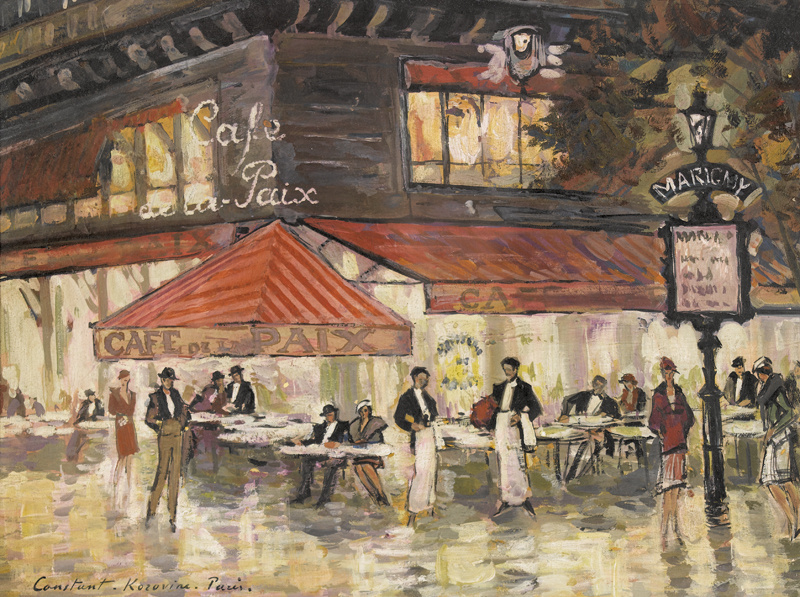
Another view by Korovin

The Café de la Paix (French pronunciation: [kafe d(ə) la pɛ]) is a café located on the northwest corner of the intersection of the Boulevard des Capucines and the Place de l'Opéra, in the 9th arrondissement of Paris, France. Designed in the Napoleon III style by the architect Alfred Armand, who also designed the historic Grand Hôtel in which the café is located, its florid interior decorations, historic location, and high-profile clientele have all brought it international recognition as a site of great cultural significance.

== History ==
The Café de la Paix was opened on 30 June 1862 to serve the Grand-Hôtel de la Paix, whose name was later shortened to Le Grand-Hôtel. Both were constructed as part of Haussmann's renovation of Paris, with financing from the wealthy Pereire Brothers. It first gained an international reputation by servicing visitors to the International Exposition of 1867. Its proximity to the Palais Garnier opera attracted many famous regulars including Jules Massenet, Émile Zola, Pyotr Ilyich Tchaikovsky, and Guy de Maupassant. During the Belle Époque, visitors to the café included Sergei Diaghilev, Oscar Wilde, and the Prince of Wales and future King of the United Kingdom, Edward VII.

The café quickly became a major cultural phenomenon and tourist attraction, being depicted in numerous forms of media beginning in the late 1800s. It was first used as a site for film screenings in 1896, and continued to attract Hollywood figures like Marlene Dietrich, Yves Montand, and Roman Polanski throughout its life, both as guests and as the crew of films shot onsite. The café is referenced in musical works by Sidney Bechet and Thomas Fersen, and is the subject of numerous impressionist paintings by artists like Konstantin Korovin, Antoine Blanchard, and Édouard Cortès. It is the setting for the poem The Absinthe Drinkers by the Canadian poet Robert Service and a short story My Old Man by Ernest Hemingway. It is also depicted in the Disney film The Aristocats, inserted as a reference by Walt Disney who had visited during his time as a Red Cross ambulance driver in World War I. A radio studio was later installed in the café, which broadcast the 1948 program This Is Paris — the first-ever live broadcast from Paris to the United States.

On 1 September 1897 ownership of the café and the Grand-Hôtel were transferred from the Pereires to French hotel magnate Arthur Millon, who leveraged the site to create one of Paris' largest hospitality industry conglomerates. Upon his death in 1913, he bequeathed his hotel empire to his son André. Following disputes over the latter's succession, the conglomerate (including the café itself) was sold in 1972. On 22 August 1975 the café's interior, as well as numerous parts of the hotel which house it, were declared a monument historique by the French government. The Café de la Paix was renovated in 2002 by the Bâtiments de France, a state-run architectural firm specializing in historic preservation.
