= Daniel Ridgway Knight =

American painter

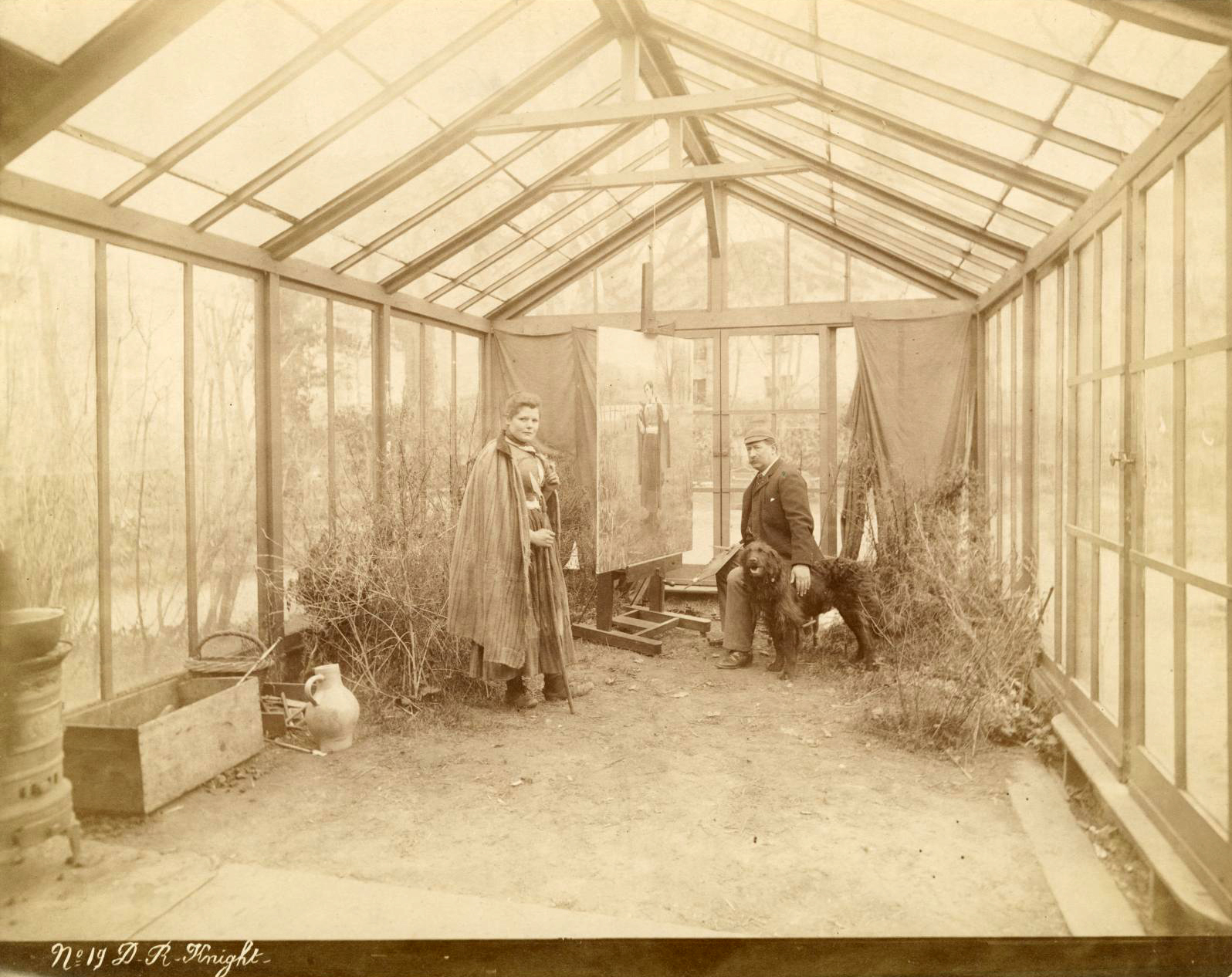
Daniel Ridgway Knight in his studio.

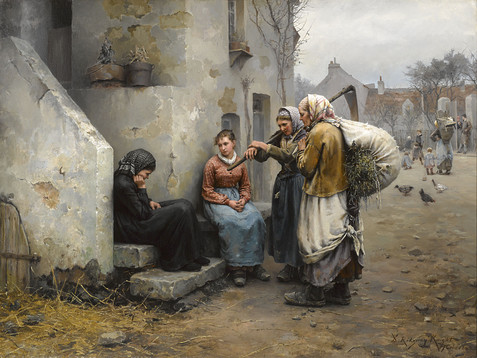
Un Deuil by Daniel Ridgway Knight, Oil on Canvas, 1882

Daniel Ridgway Knight (15 March 1839 – 9 March 1924) was an American artist born in Chambersburg, Pennsylvania.

== Biography ==
Knight was a pupil at the École des Beaux-Arts, Paris, under Gleyre, and later worked in the private studio of Meissonier. After 1872 he lived in France, having a house and studio at Poissy on the Seine.

He painted peasant women out of doors with great popular success. He earned his first major distinction in France at the Salon of 1882 with his large oil on canvas Un Deuil. He would go on to be awarded the silver medal and Cross of the Legion of Honor, Exposition Universelle, Paris, 1889, and was made a Knight of the Royal Order of St. Michael of Bavaria, Munich, 1893, and receiving the gold medal of honor from the Pennsylvania Academy of the Fine Arts, Philadelphia, 1893.

Knight was also an Olympic sailor. He competed in the 3 to 10 ton sailing event at the 1900 Summer Olympics in his boat the Sans-Gene, where he did not finish the first race.

He died in Neuilly-sur-Seine, Paris. His son, Louis Aston Knight (1873–1948), was also known as a landscape painter.

The catalogue raisonné research on Daniel Ridgway Knight's life and work is being conducted by Rehs Galleries, Inc., New York City.

== Gallery ==
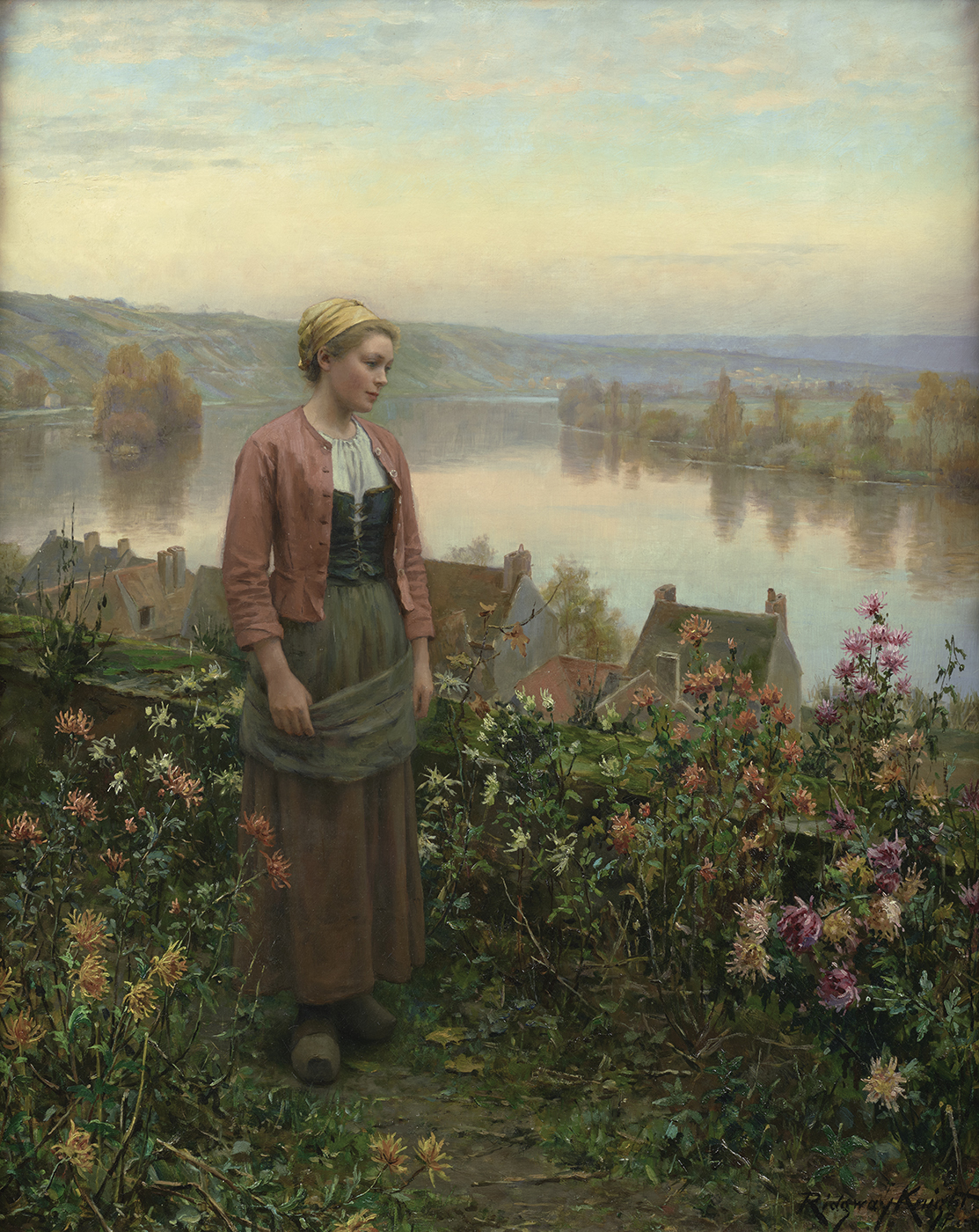
Maria on the Terrace, Rolleboise Rehs Galleries, Inc., New York City

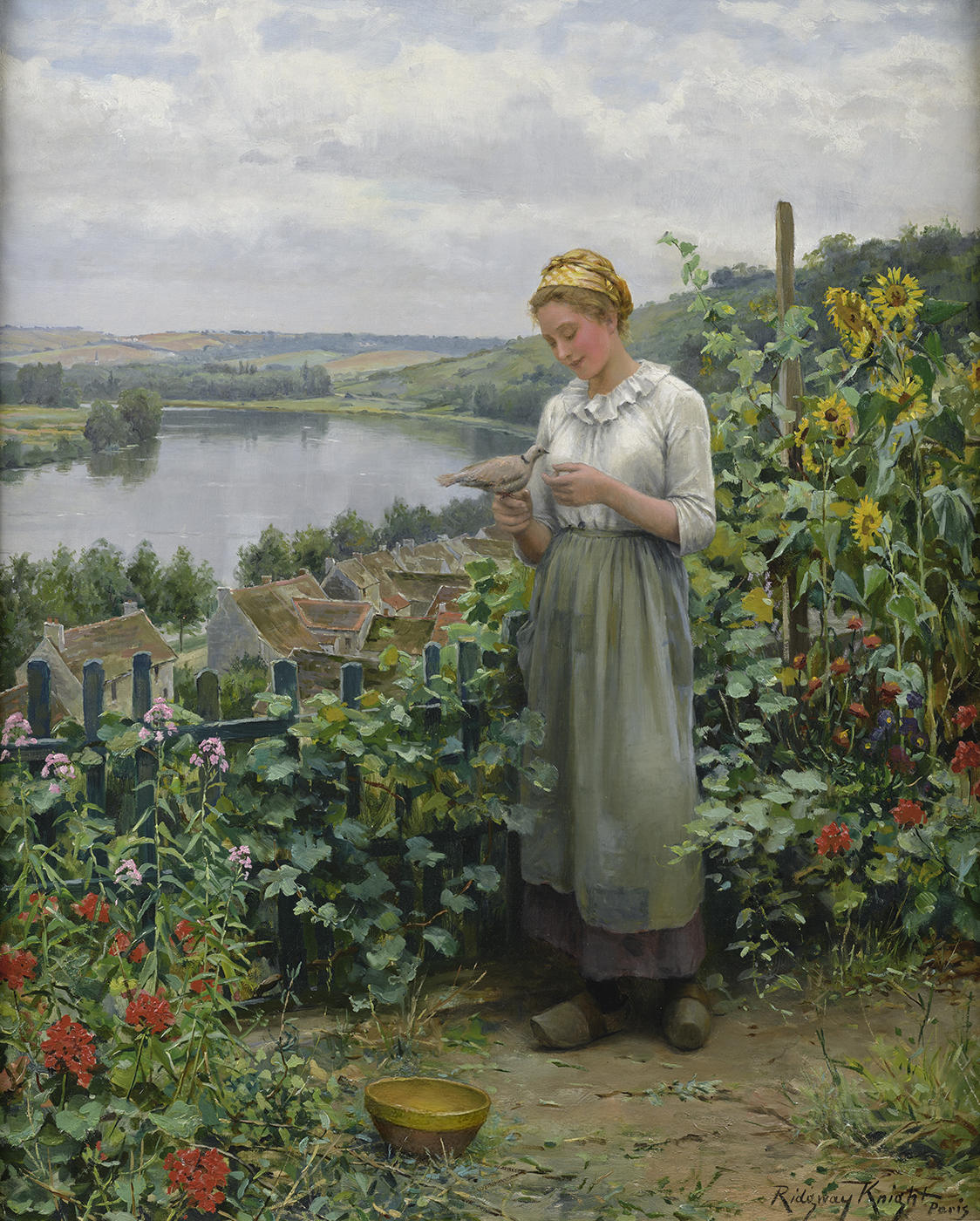
The Pet Dove Rehs Galleries, Inc., New York City

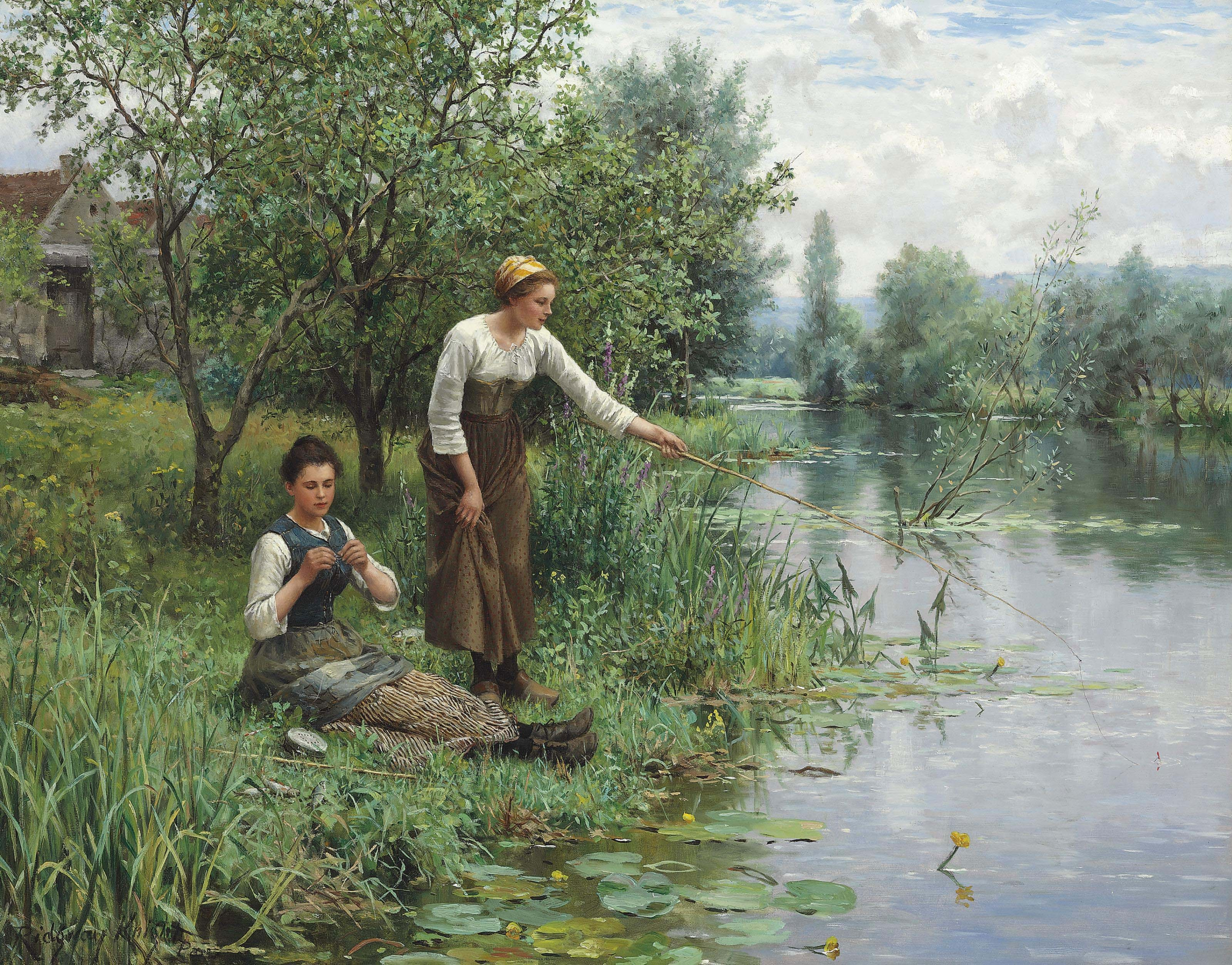
Two Women Fishing

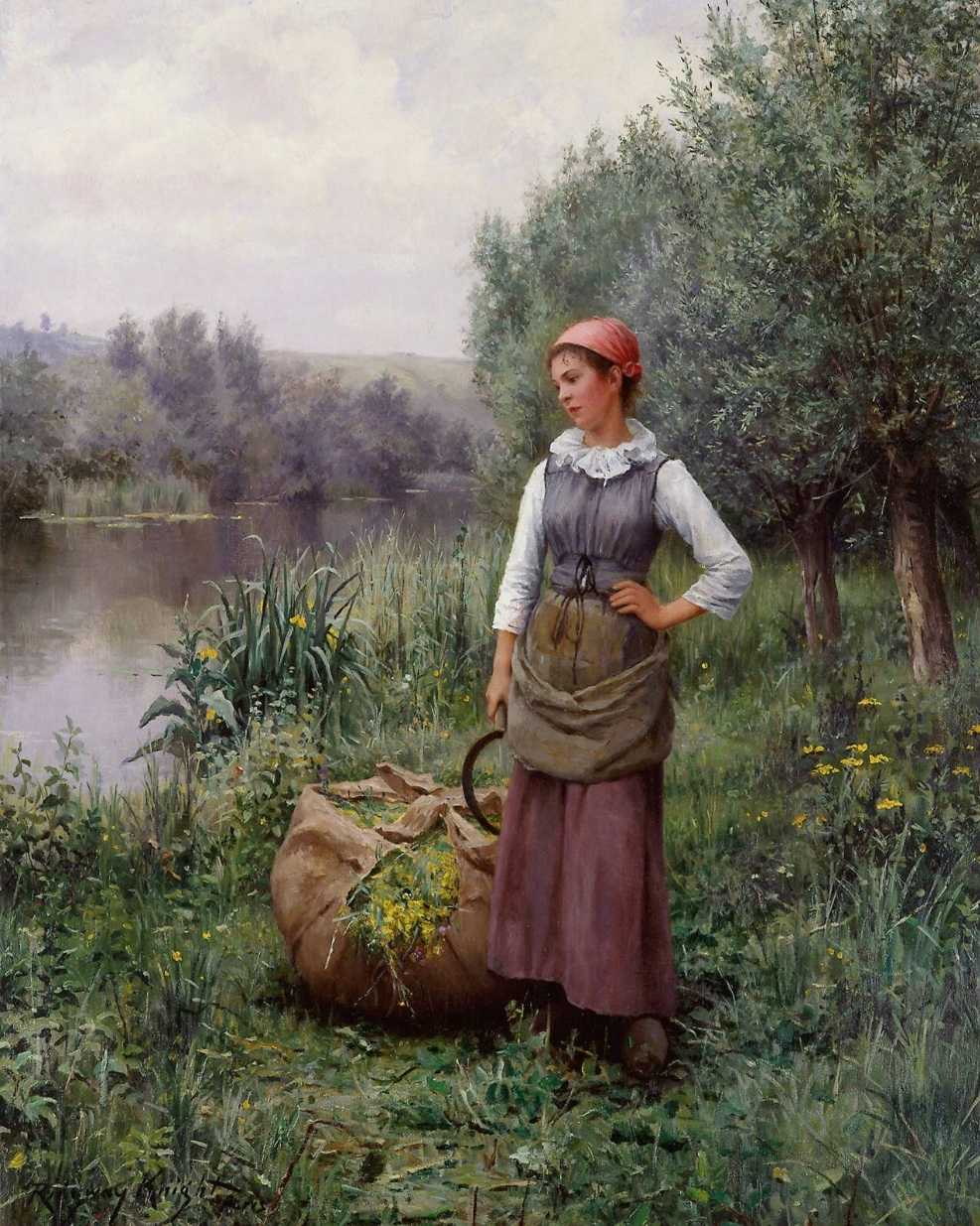
Girl by a Stream

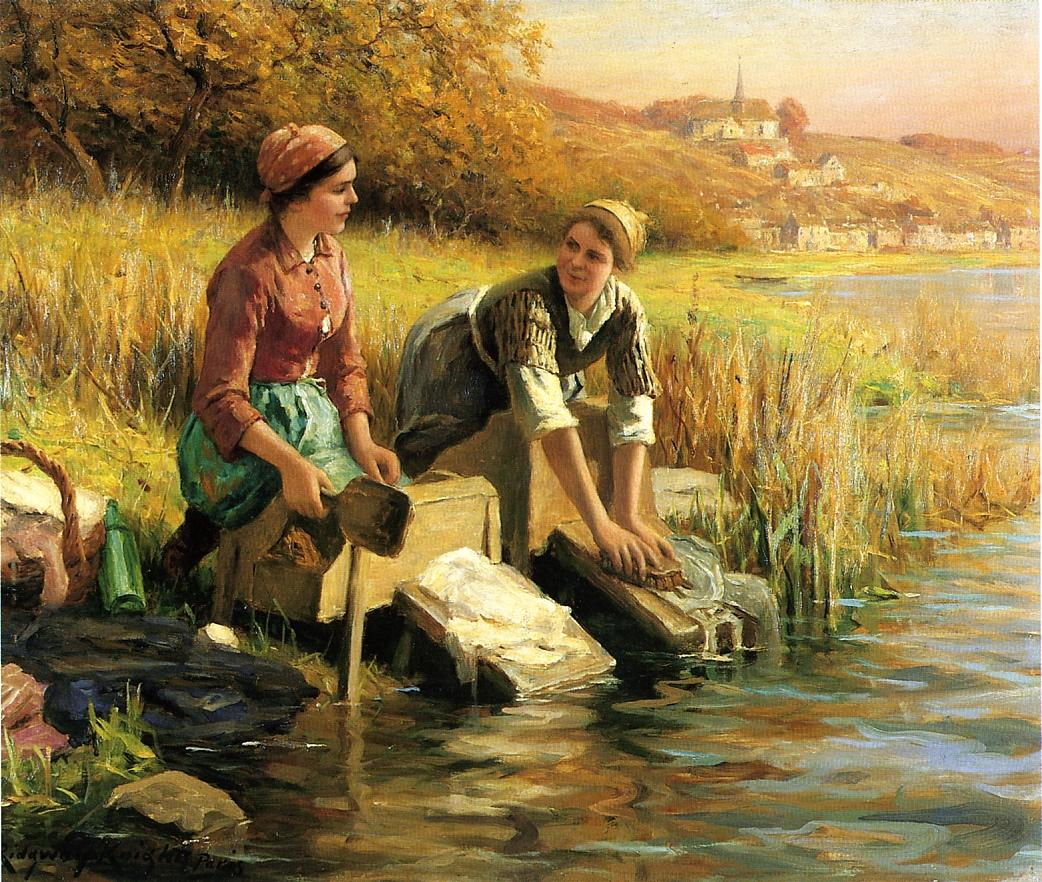
Women Washing Clothes by a Stream

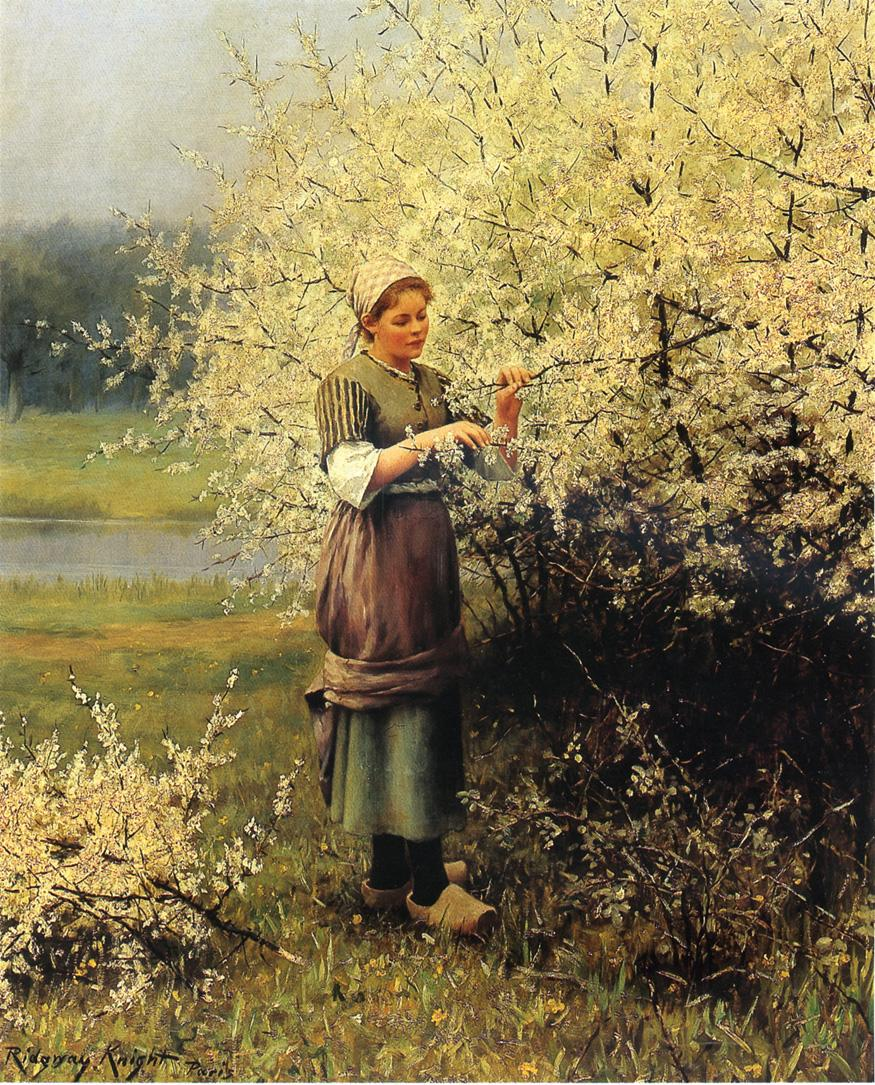
Spring Blossoms

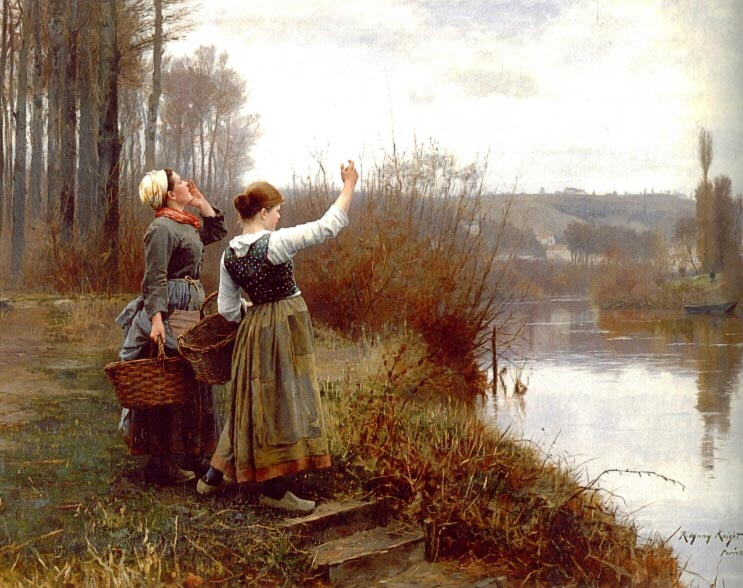
Hailing the Ferry

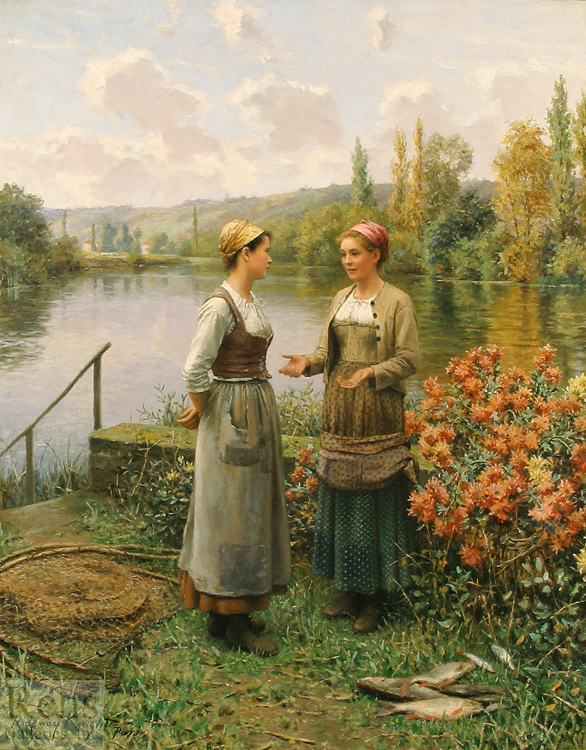
The Day's Catch Rehs Galleries, Inc., New York City

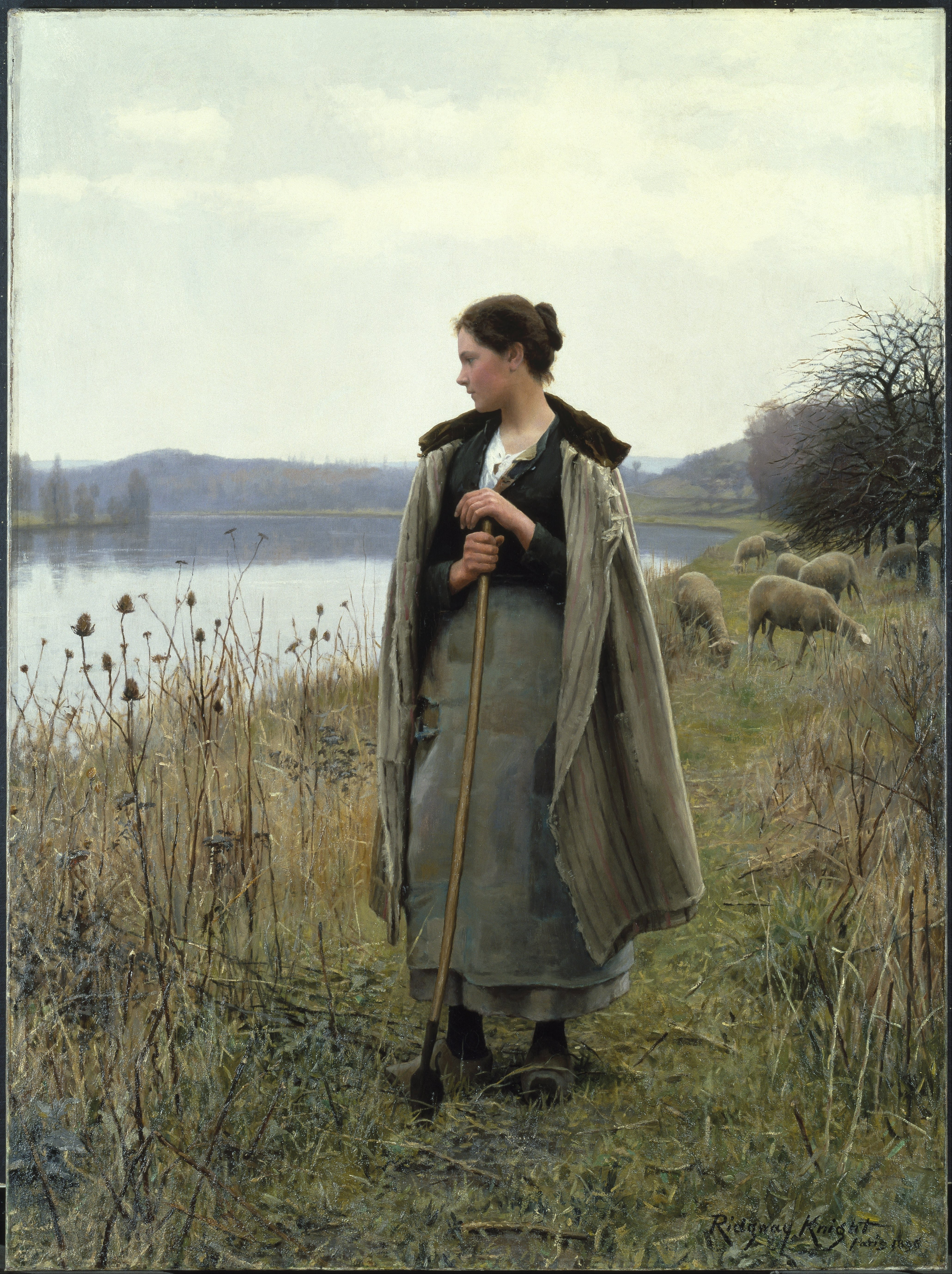
Daniel Ridgway Knight. The Shepherdess of Rolleboise, 1896. Oil on canvas. Brooklyn Museum

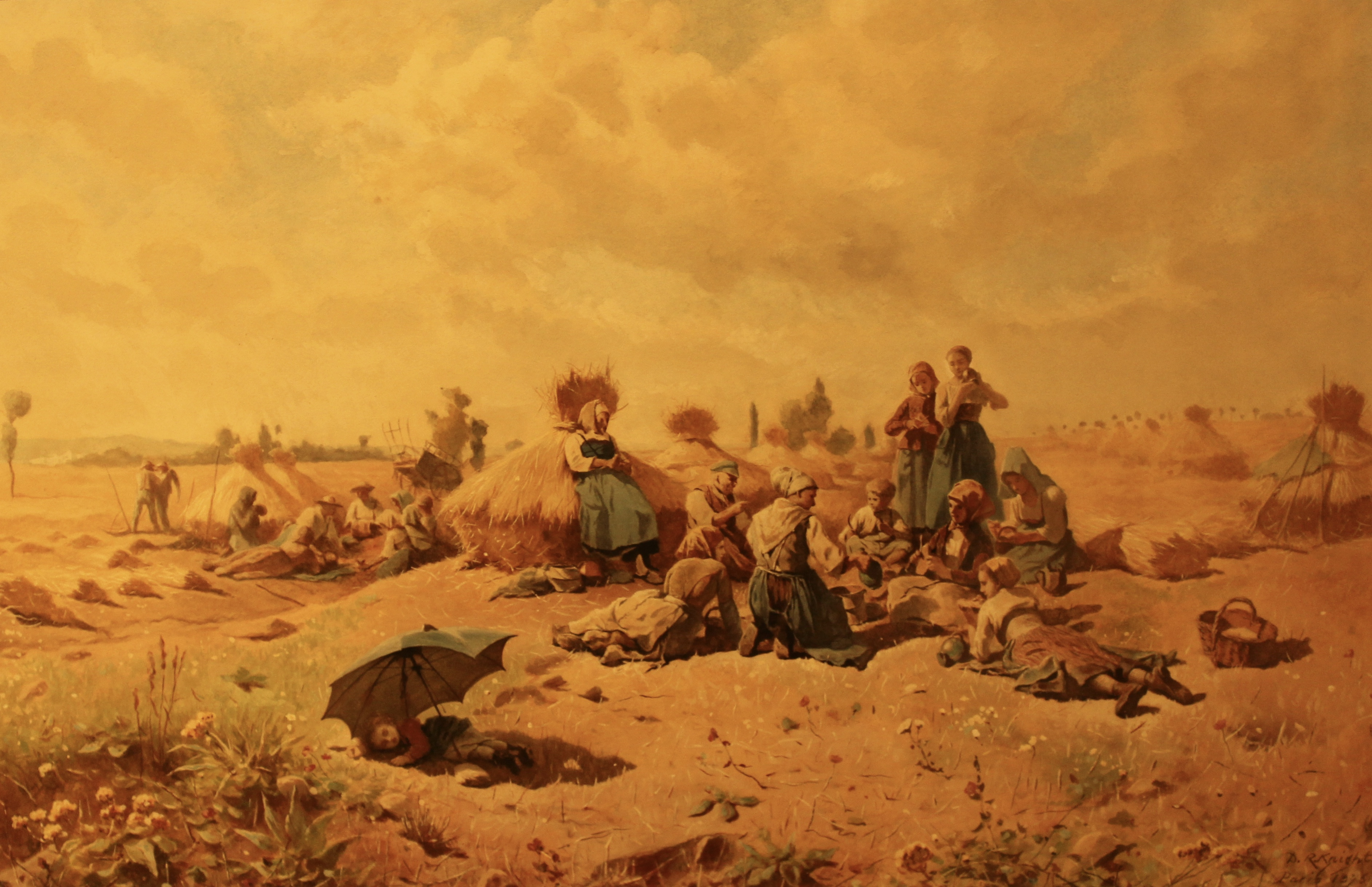
Pot a Feu, 1875. Widener University Art Museum Alfred O. Deshong Collection
