= Louis Aston Knight =

American painter

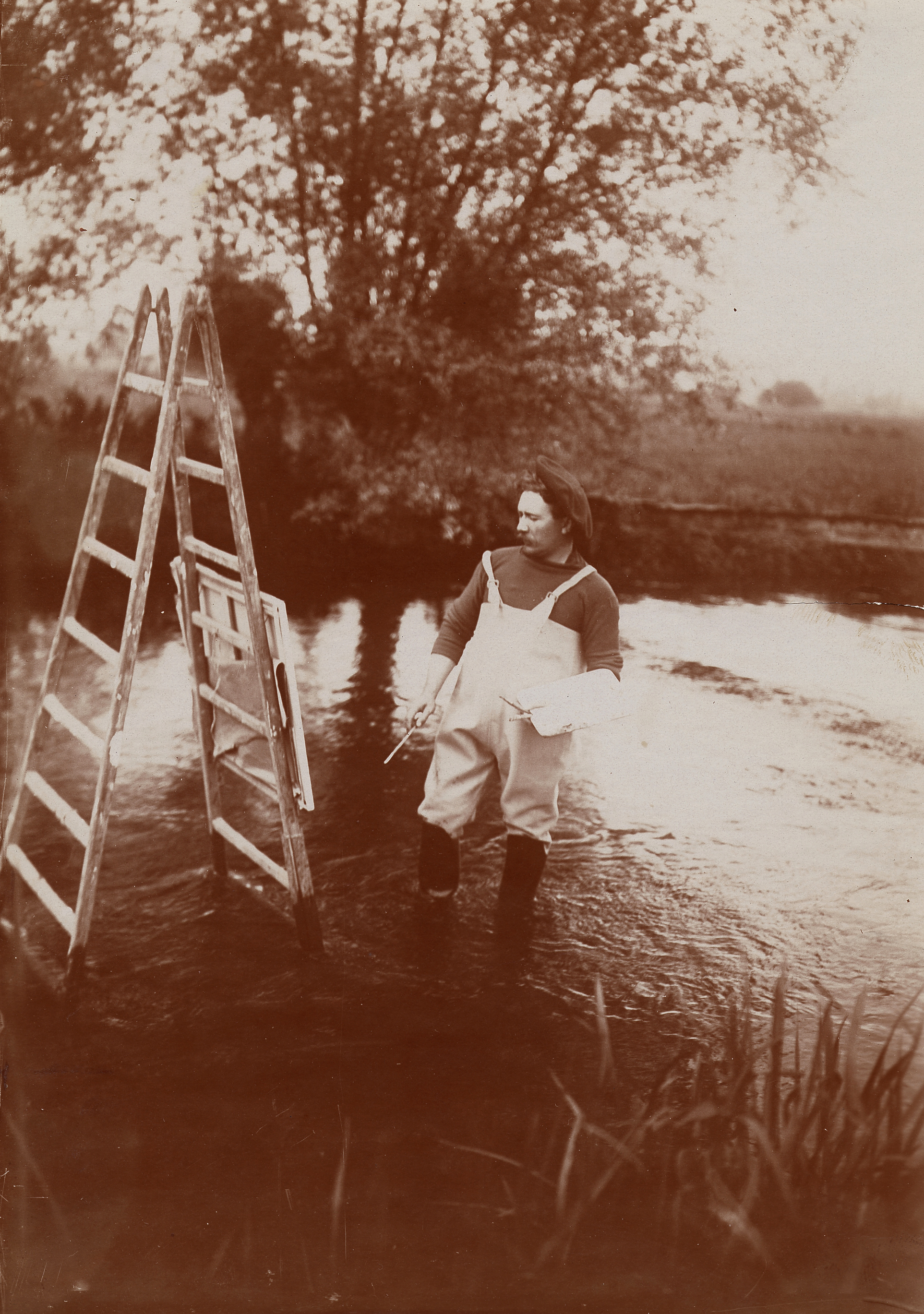
Knight painting in a stream, circa 1900.

Louis Aston Knight (1873 — 1948) was a French-born American artist noted for his paintings of landscapes. One of his paintings, The Afterglow, was purchased by U.S. President Warren G. Harding in 1922 to hang in the White House.

== Biography ==
Aston Knight, the son of painter Daniel Ridgway Knight and Rebecca Morris Webster Knight, was born in Paris in 1873. He was raised in Europe and received his early training with his father. He later continued his studies with Tony Robert-Fleury and Jules Lefebvre.

Aston Knight exhibited his first work at the Paris Salon in 1894 and continued exhibiting there throughout his lifetime, winning an honorable mention in 1901, a third class gold medal in 1905, and second class gold medal in 1906. His favorite subjects were the cottages and gardens in the towns surrounding his home in Beaumont-le-Roger. He was noted for his ability to render "the transparency, the reflections and the movements of water."

He married Caroline Ridgeway Brewster at the home of State Senator Joseph Sherman Frelinghuysen, Sr. in Raritan, New Jersey in 1907. They had two sons, Ridgway Brewster Knight and George William Knight, and a daughter, Diane Knight Todd, whose childhood playhouse was a frequent subject of Knight's paintings. He was promoted to officer of the Légion d'honneur, the highest decoration in France, in 1927.

His auction record is $108,000, for A Cottage Along the River, secured at Sotheby's, New York on 30 November 2005. The painting was purchased by Rehs Galleries, Inc., New York, and the title was corrected to Beaumontel (as inscribed on the reverse by the artist).

== Selected paintings ==
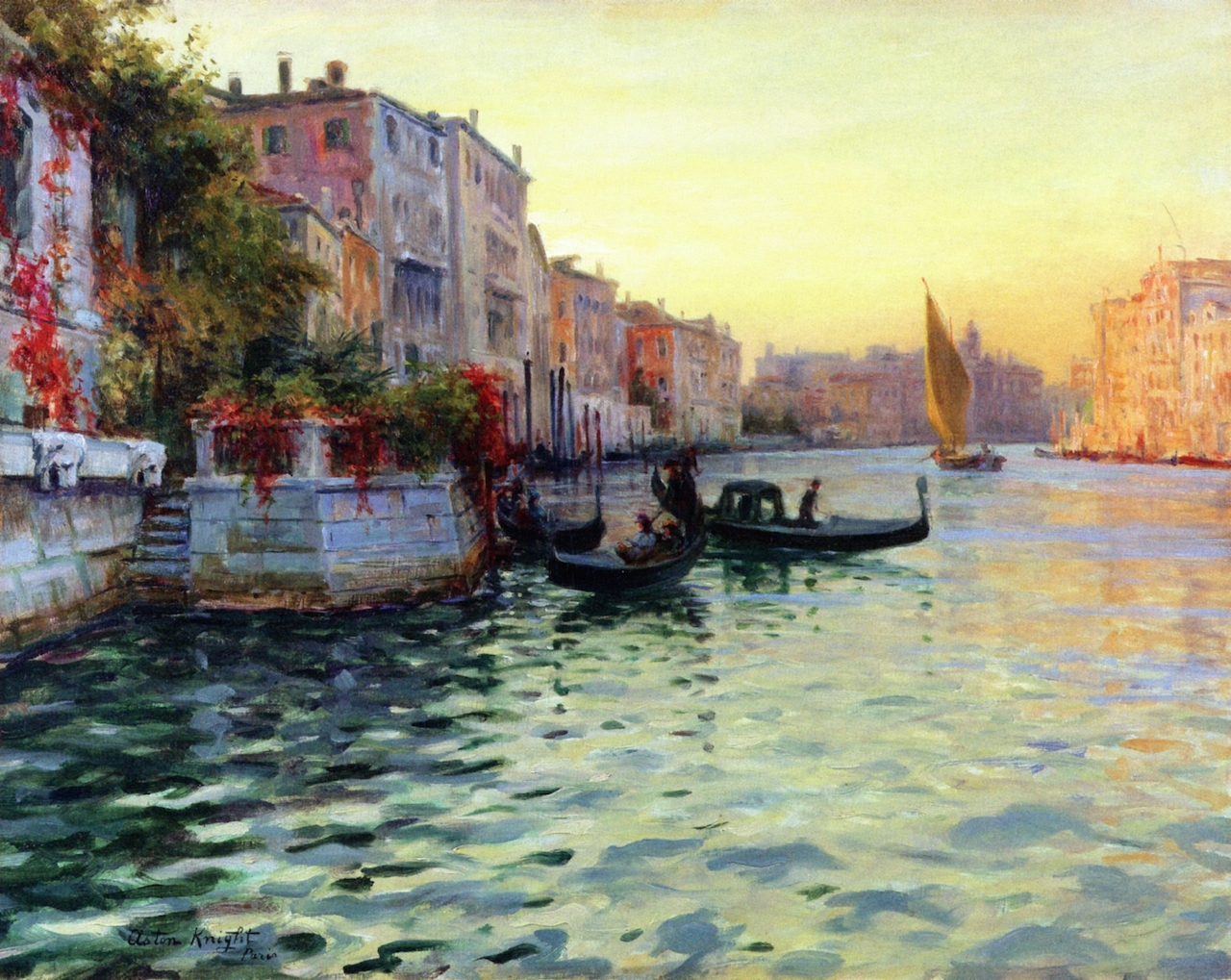
Venice

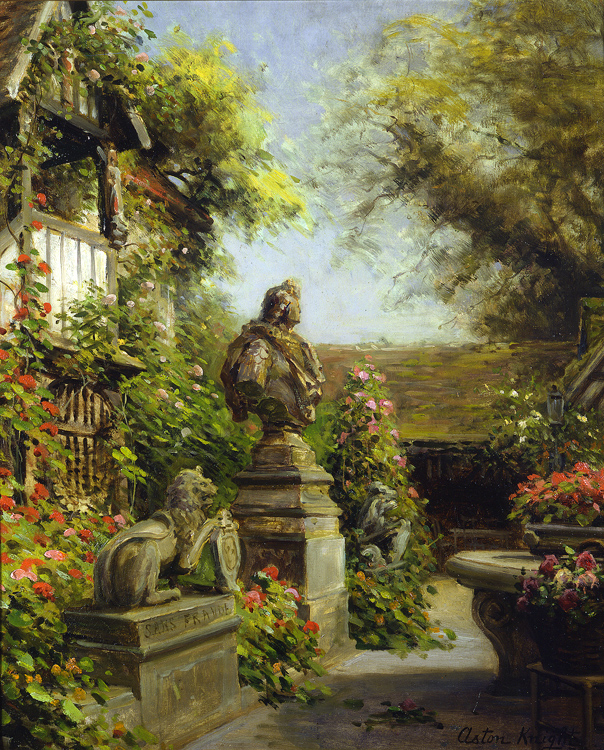
Summer Garden

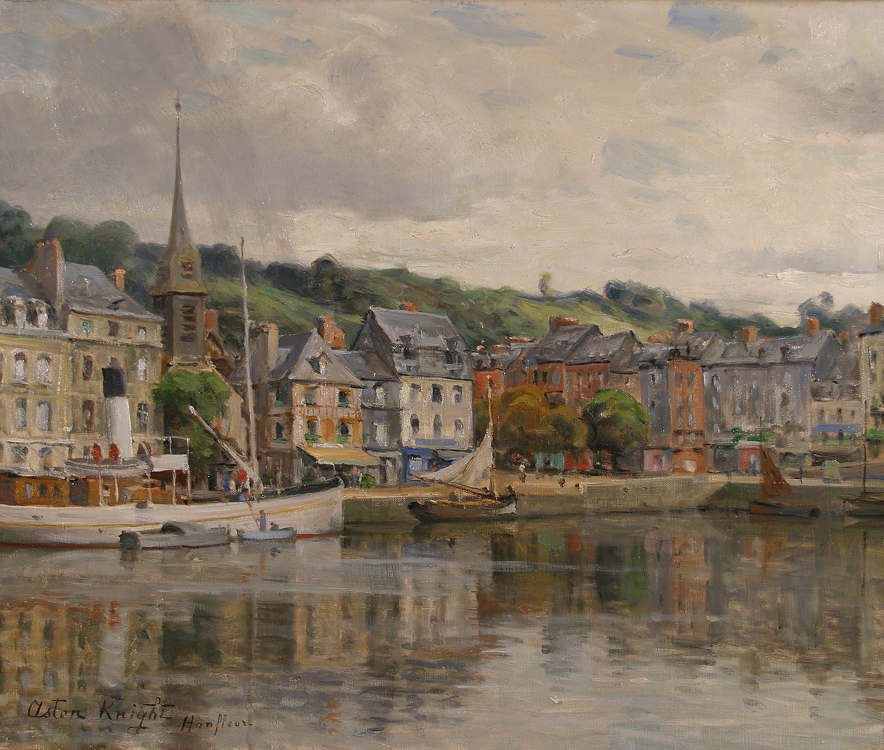
Honfleur

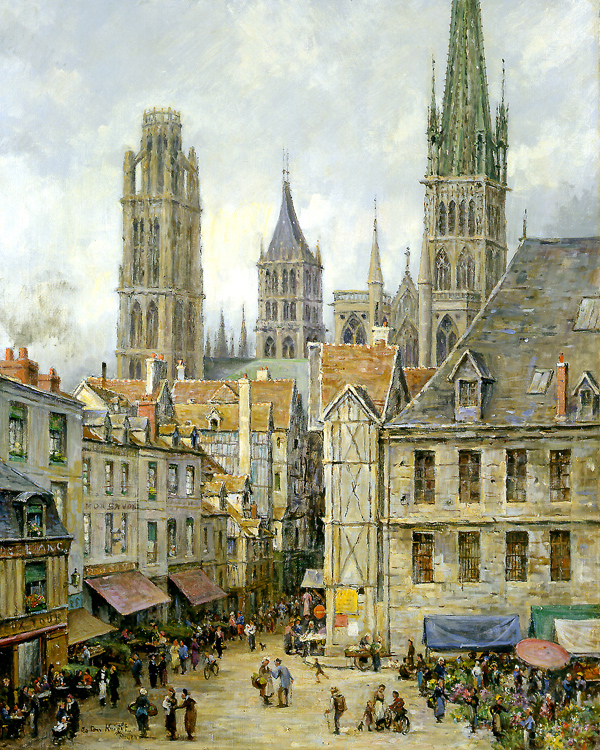
Marketplace, Rouen

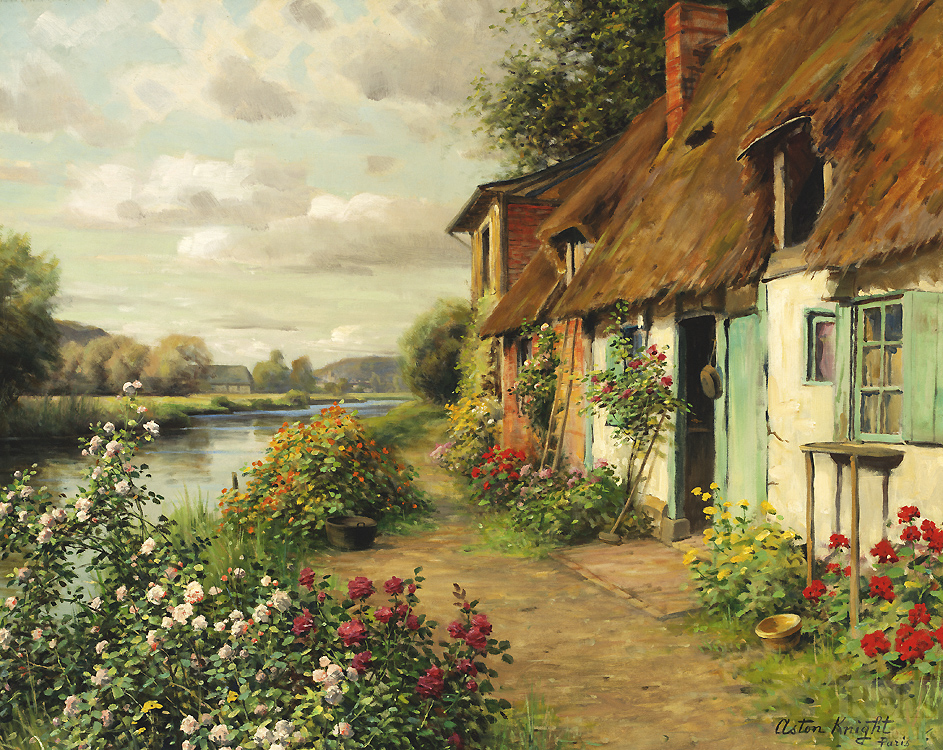
The Blue Cottage
