= Josh Tiessen =

Canadian painter (born 1995)

Josh Tiessen is an artist and writer.

== Early life and education ==
Tiessen was born in 1995 in Russia to Canadian parents. After spending his early life in Russia, he moved to Canada at the age of 6.

== Career ==
Mentored by Robert Bateman, Tiessen exhibited his first artwork at the age of 11.

In 2010, Tiessen opened Josh Tiessen Studio Gallery.

In 2012, his painting, Overshadowed, was exhibited at the National Gallery of Canada. In the following year, he received an award for his gallery exhibition at the Burlington Art Centre (now Art Gallery of Burlington).

In 2016, his first art monograph, Josh Tiessen: A Decade of Inspiration, was published.

In May 2019, Jonathan LeVine Projects presented his exhibition, "Streams in the Wasteland".

In 2020, his work, Refracting Infinity, was exhibited at Rehs Galleries.

As a philanthropist, Tiessen was the founder of Arts for a Change Foundation.

Tiessen is also known for his book, Streams in the Wasteland, an art and music collaboration with his brother Zac Tiessen, supporting conservation.

== Bibliography ==
- Tiessen, Josh (2016). Josh Tiessen: A Decade of Inspiration
- Tiessen, Josh (2021). Streams in the Wasteland

== Awards and recognition ==
- Queen Elizabeth II Diamond Jubilee Medal (2012)
- Top 20 Under 20 Canada, Youth in Motion (2013)
- First place in Delusional Art Competition, Jonathan LeVine Projects (2017)
