= Antonio Jacobsen =

American painter (1850–1921)

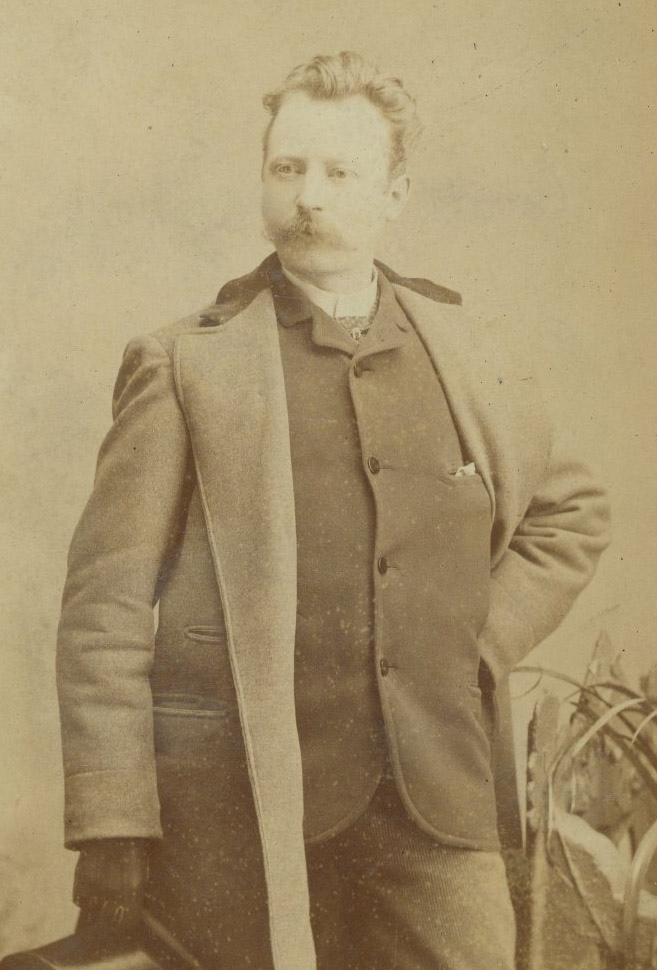
- Jacobsen as a young man
- Born: November 2, 1850; Copenhagen, Denmark
- Died: February 2, 1921 (aged 70); New York City, U.S.
- Education: Royal Academy of Design, Copenhagen
- Known for: Maritime art
- Spouse: Mary Melanie Schmidt (m. 1878; died 1909)
- Children: 3

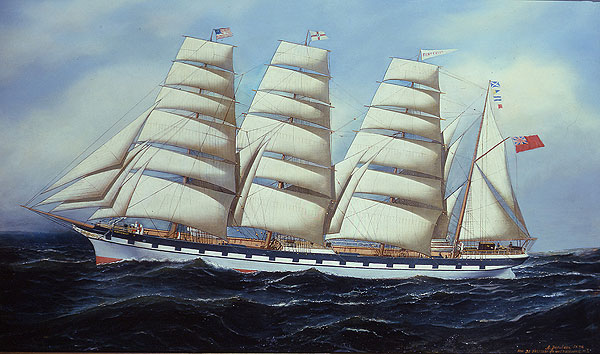
"The Forteviot," 1896

Antonio Nicolo Gasparo Jacobsen (November 2, 1850 – February 2, 1921) was a Danish-born American maritime artist known as the "Audubon of Steam Vessels".

== Biography ==
Jacobsen was born in Copenhagen, Denmark where he attended the Royal Academy of Design before heading across the Atlantic Ocean. He arrived in the United States in August 1873. He settled in West Hoboken, New Jersey (now Union City, New Jersey), across the Hudson River from Manhattan and New York Harbor, its port filled with ships from America and around the world. Jacobsen got his start painting pictures of ships on safes, and as his reputation grew, he was asked to do portraits of ships by their owners, captains and crew members, with many of his works selling for five dollars.

Jacobsen painted more than 6,000 portraits of sail and steam vessels, making him "the most prolific of marine artists". Many of his commissions came from sea captains, and Jacobsen was chosen both for the accuracy of his work and his low fee.

== Exhibitions and collections ==
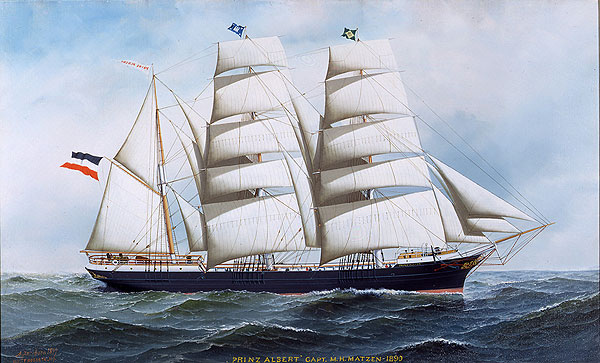
"The Prinz Albert," 1897

Exhibitions of Jacobsen's work include a 1996 showing of 45 of his paintings at the National Museum of American History. In 1995, the Mariners' Museum in Newport News, Virginia held an exhibition that included 80 paintings by Jacobsen. In conjunction with the exhibition, the museum published a volume by Harold S. Sniffen, the museum's curator emeritus, whose biography titled Antonio Jacobsen's Painted Ships on Painted Oceans, includes some 100 color pictures of the artist's ship paintings.

The public rooms of The Griswold Inn in Essex, Connecticut, the oldest continuously run tavern in the United States, features the largest privately held collection of Jacobsen's paintings. John McMullen, a naval architect and marine engineer (and former owner of the New Jersey Devils), had a collection that included 75 paintings by Jacobsen, the first two of which were found in the 1940s in the offices of the family ship repair business.

On February 19, 2006, Fetching The Mark, an unsigned painting of the racing yacht Dreadnought attributed to Jacobsen, was sold at auction for $281,000, more than triple the highest price previously paid for one of Jacobsen's works. The piece had been brought to an Antiques Road Show event in Tampa, Florida, and had originally been thought to be a work of Jacobsen's contemporary James E. Buttersworth, until further research led to a conclusion that it was by Jacobsen.

== Personal ==
Jacobsen and his wife Mary had three children; Carl, Helen and Alphonse. Mary died in 1909.

== Gallery ==
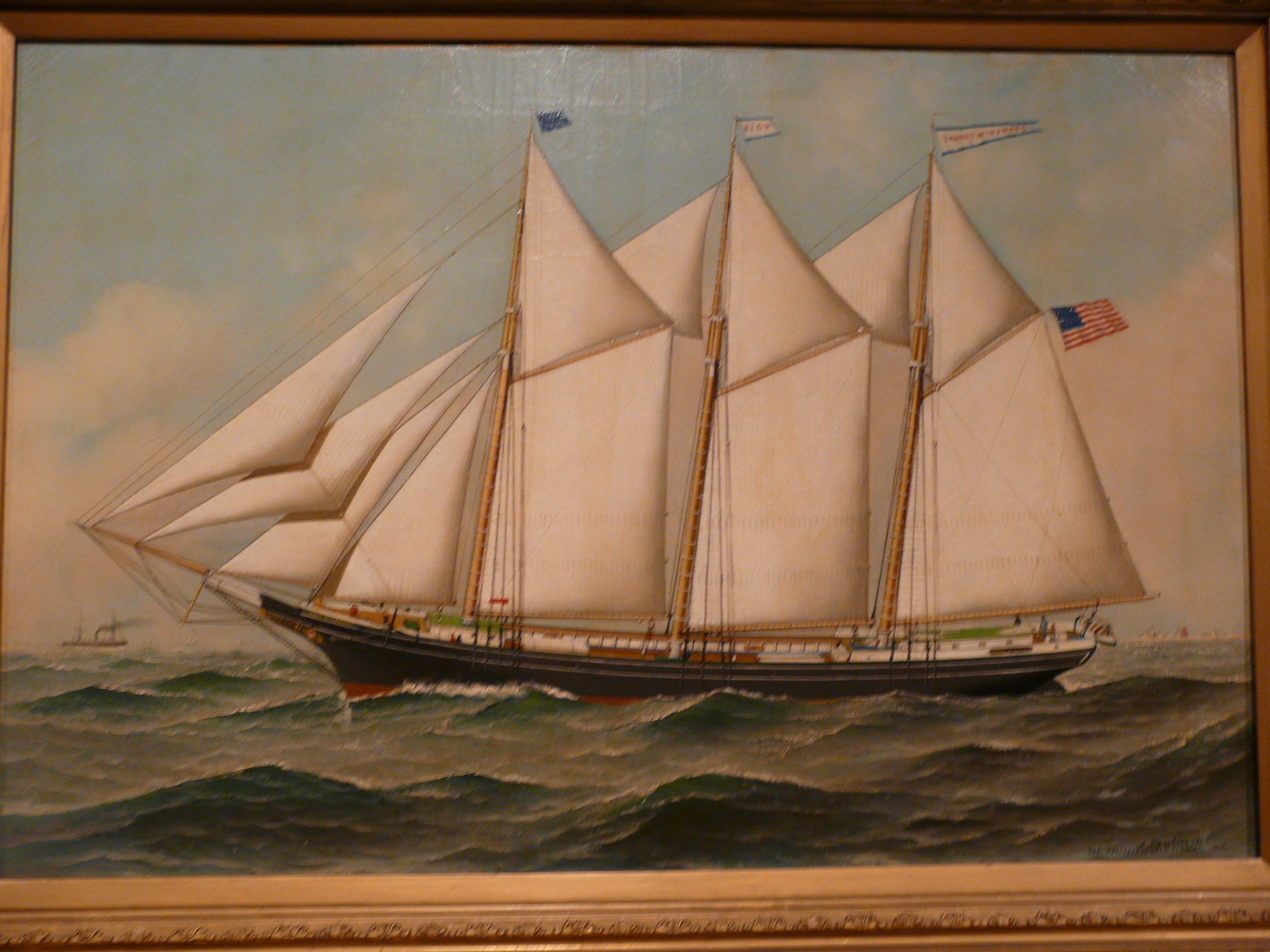
Schooner Thomas Winsmore, Independence Seaport Museum

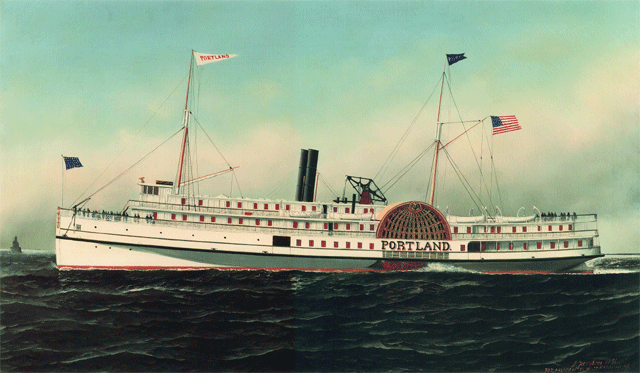
Portland 1890

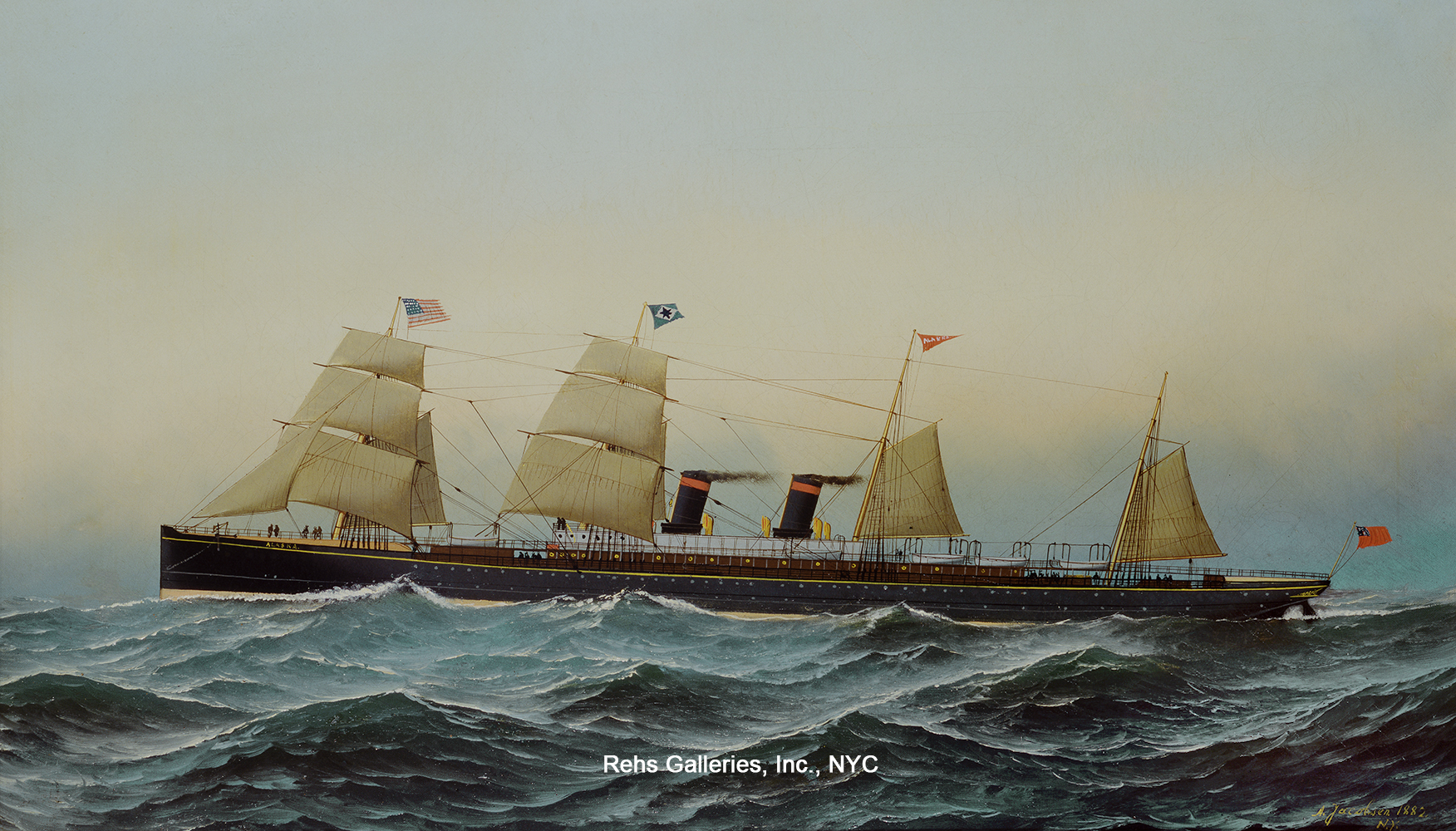
The Alaska Rehs Galleries

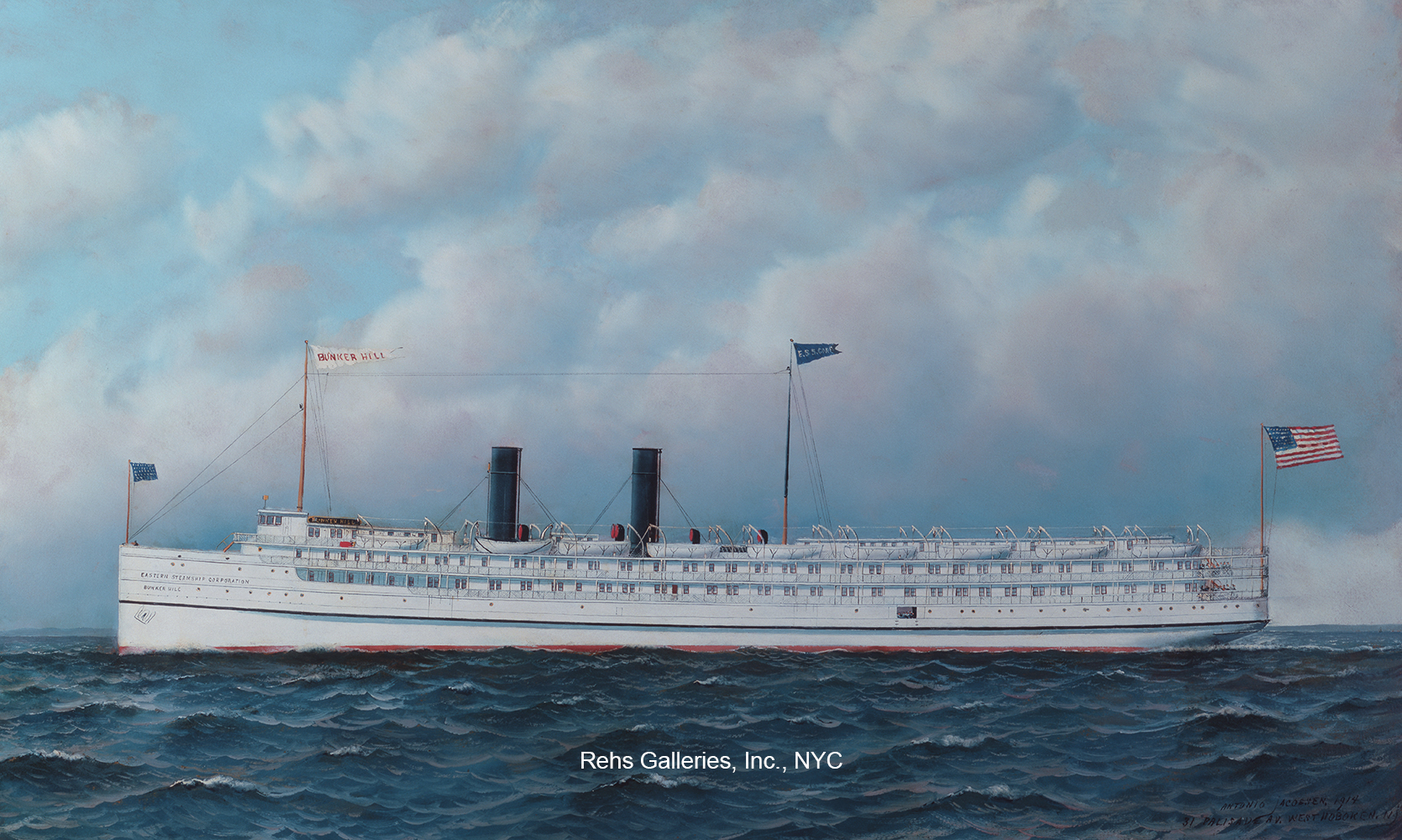
The SS Bunker Hill Rehs Galleries

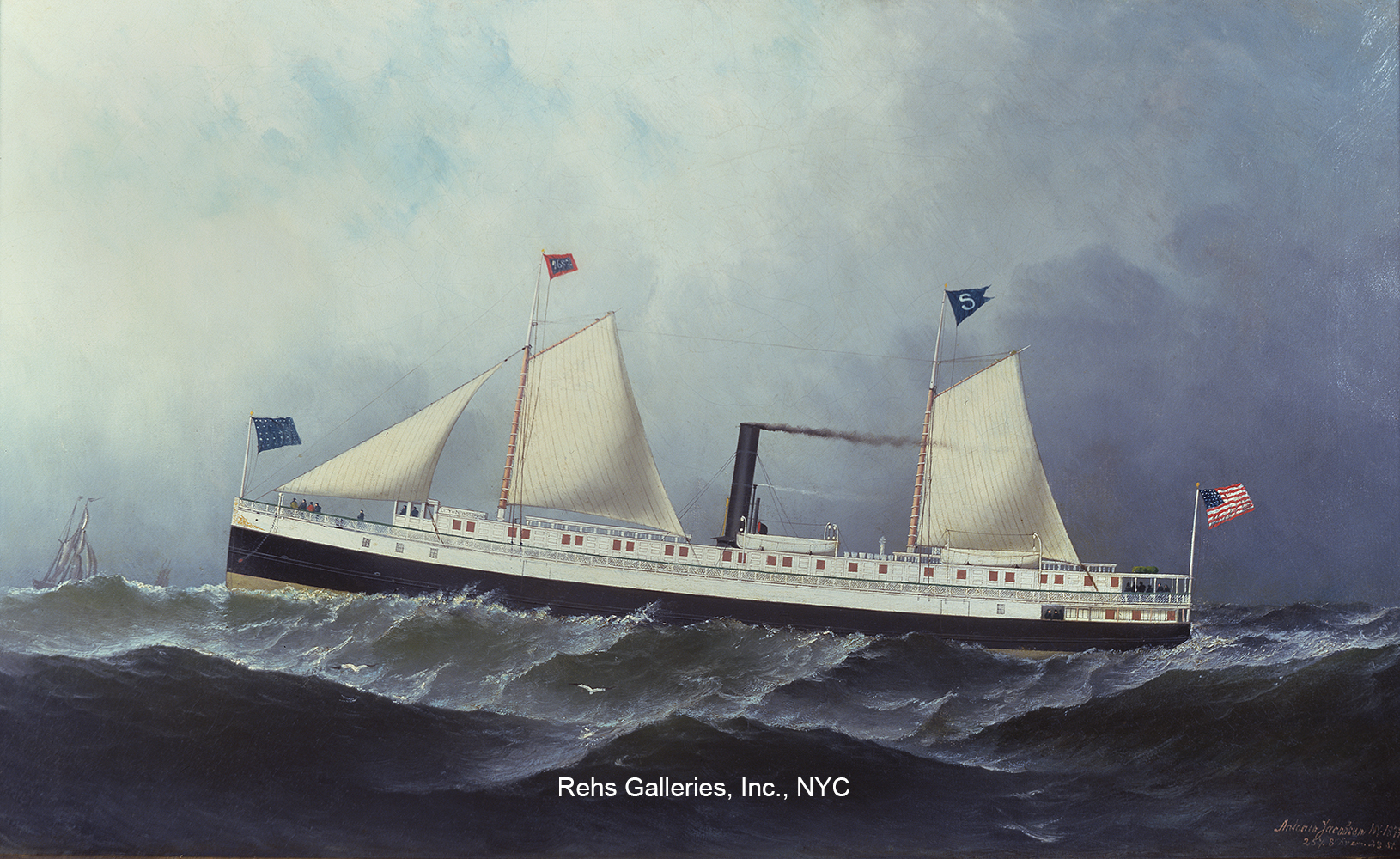
The City of New Bedford Rehs Galleries

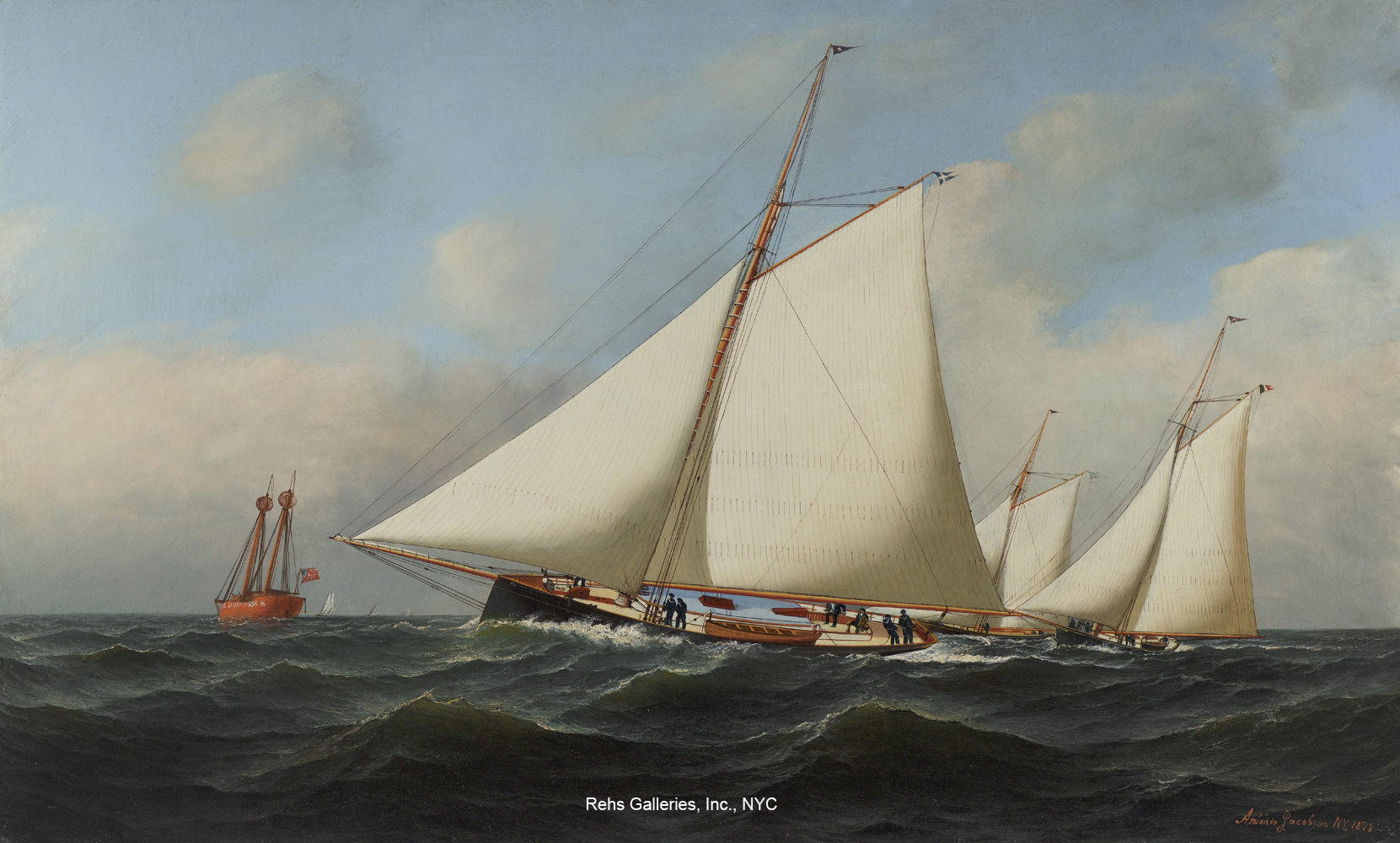
New York Yacht Club Race, 1878 Rehs Galleries

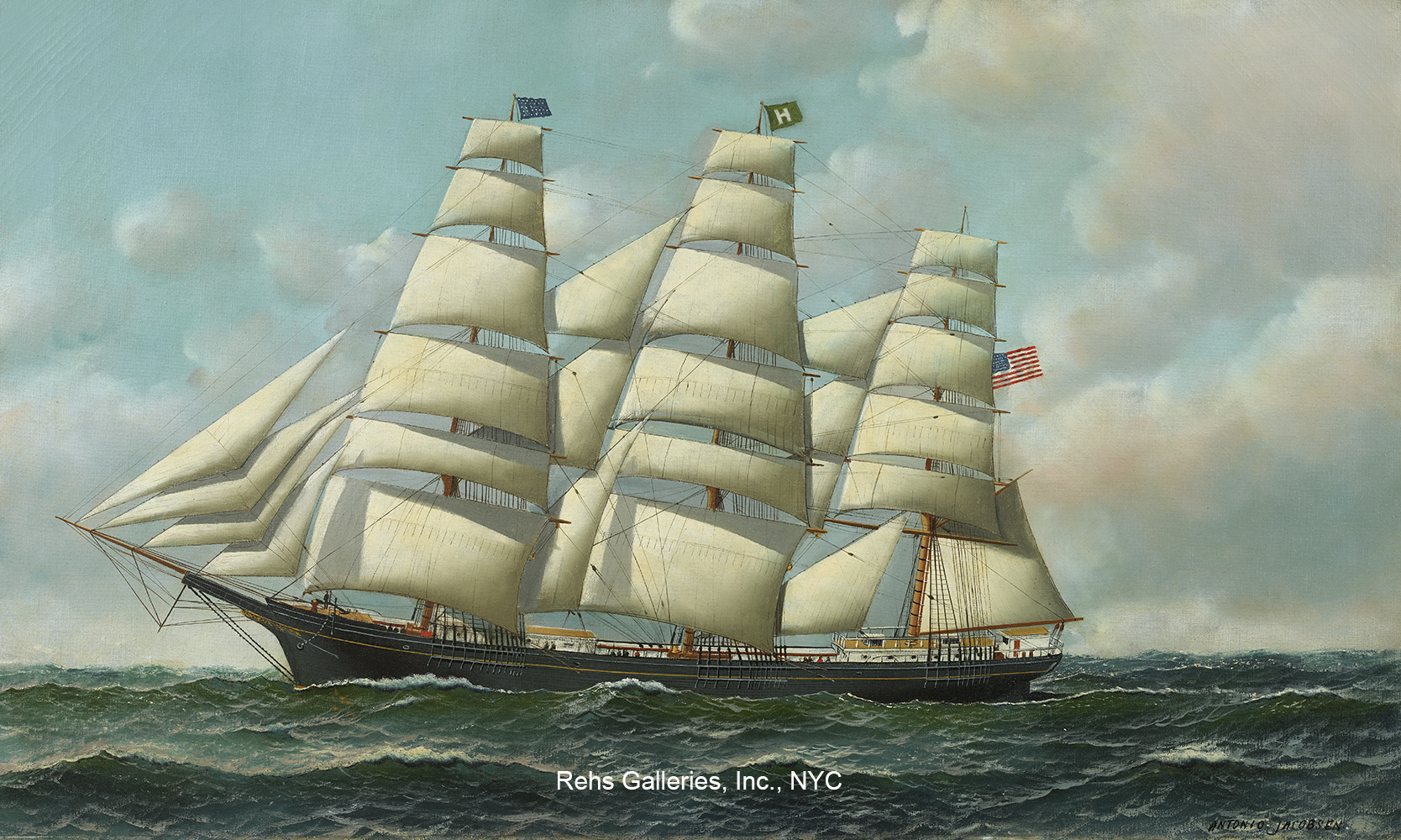
An American Clipper Rehs Galleries

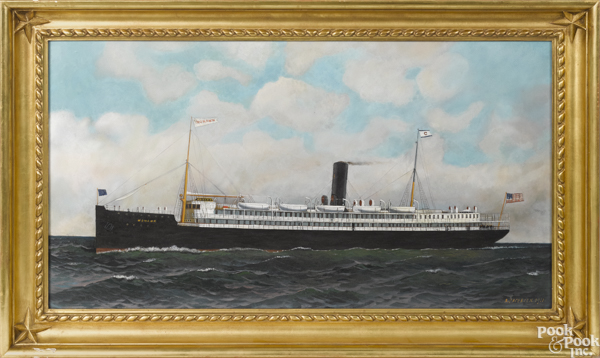
S.S. Mohawk, dated 1911

In the trough of the seas, USS Adams in the collection at The Mariners' Museum

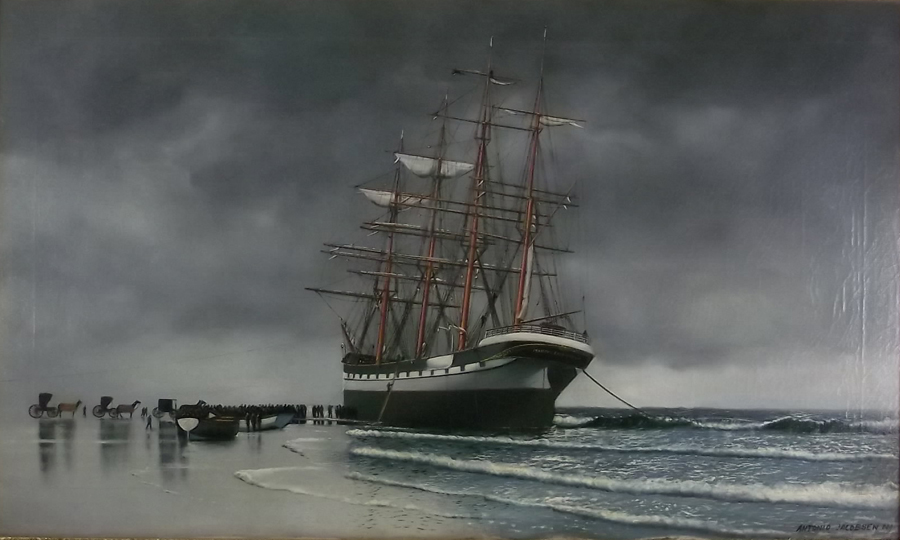
County of Edinburgh on the Beach in the collection at The Mariners' Museum

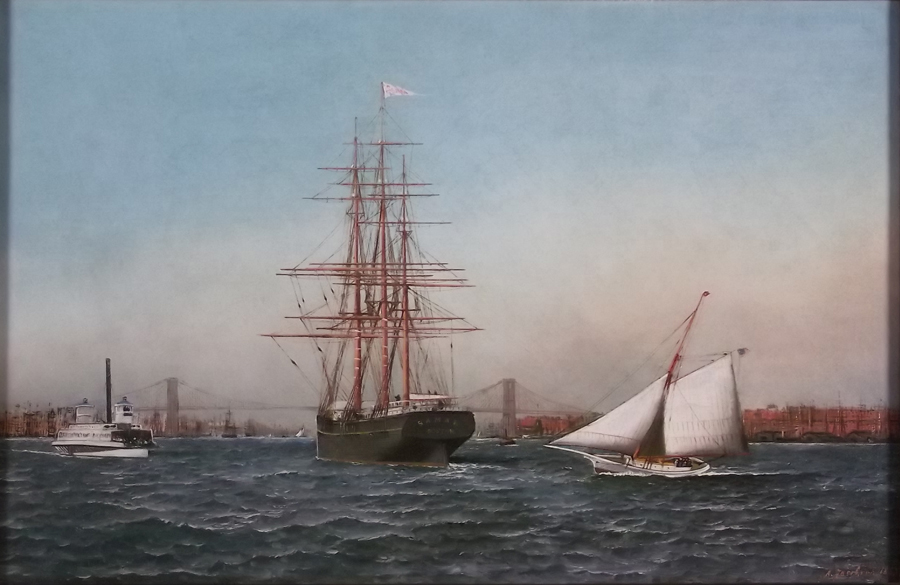
Samar in New York Harbor in the collection at The Mariners' Museum

U.S. Navy Gunboat Adams in the collection at The Mariners' Museum

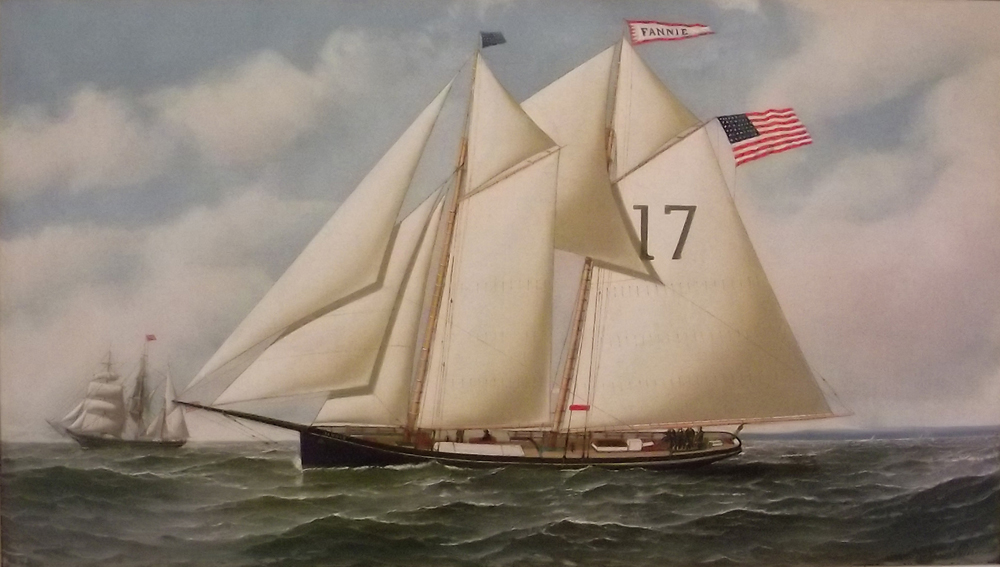
Pilot Schooner Fannie in the collection at The Mariners' Museum

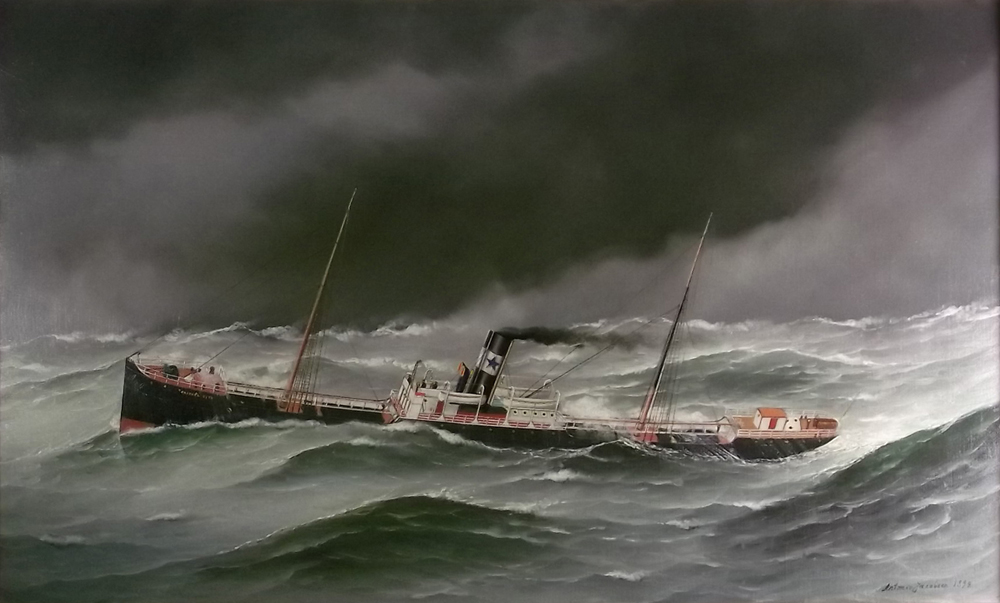
Steamship Chicago City in the collection at The Mariners' Museum

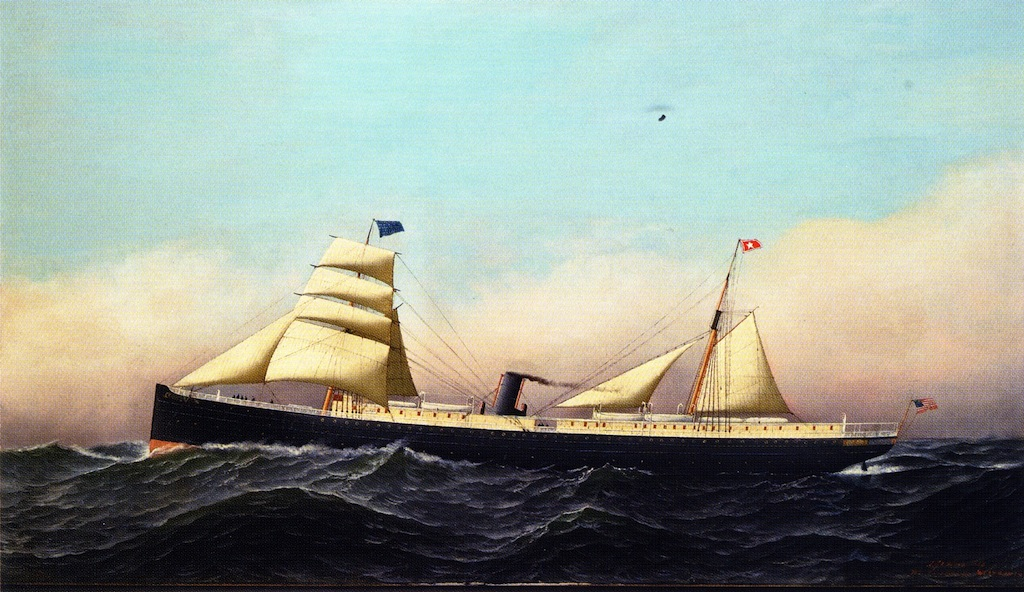
SS Columbia in a private gallery

== See also ==
- William Frederick Mitchell
- Henry Reuterdahl
- Willy Stöwer
- Burnell Poole
- Norman Wilkinson
