= Antoine Blanchard =

French painter (1910–1988)

- Born: Marcel Masson; November 15, 1910; Paris, France
- Died: August 10, 1988 (age 77); Paris, France
- Known for: Painter
- Notable work: Cafe de la Paix
- Movement: School of Paris
- Awards: Grand Prix du Public, 1979

Antoine Blanchard is the pseudonym under which the French painter Marcel Masson (15 November 1910 – 10 August 1988) painted his immensely popular Parisian street scenes. He was born in a small village near the banks of the Loire.

== Education and career ==
Blanchard received his initial artistic training at the Beaux-Arts in Rennes, Brittany. He then moved to Paris in 1932 where he joined the Ecole des Beaux-Arts.

Like Édouard Cortès (1882–1969) and Eugène Galien-Laloue (1854–1941), Antoine Blanchard essentially painted Paris and the Parisians in bygone days, often from vintage postcards. The artist began painting his Paris street scenes in the late 1950s, and like Cortès, often painted the same Paris landmark many times, in different weather conditions or various seasons. The most recurrent topics were views of the capital city in cloudy or rainy days, showing streets busy with pedestrians in a rush to go home, and bright storefronts reflecting on wet streets. Many of the French Quarter art galleries of New Orleans handle Antoine Blanchard paintings and prints since this American City has a strong French history. His art is popular in international art auctions and there are many copies. Authentication of an original Blanchard/Masson painting is necessary and the authentic signature carries a secret known by art experts. On August 10, 1988, Antoine Blanchard died aged 77.
