= Rehs Galleries =

Art gallery in Manhattan, New York City

Coordinates: 40°45′46″N 73°58′23″W

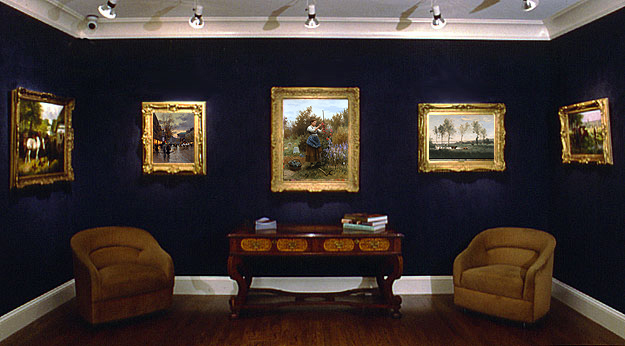
- Former name: Schillay and Rehs, Inc.
- Established: 1938
- Location: 20 W 55th St, New York City, NY 10019
- Type: Historical art gallery
- Founder: M. Edwin Schillay
- Website: https://rehs.com/eng/19th-and-20th-century-home-page/

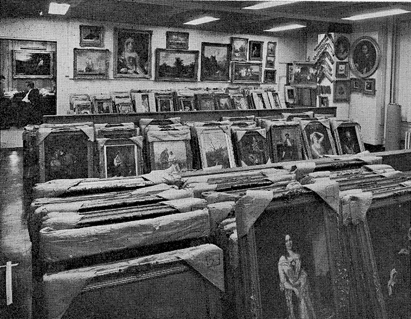
Gallery interior in the 1960s

Rehs Galleries is an art gallery at 20 West 55th Street in Midtown Manhattan, New York

City.

Experts in 19th and 20th century European and American art, the gallery focuses on artists who exhibited at the Paris Salon and the Royal Academy from 1850-1920 as well as the works of Edouard Cortès and Antoine Blanchard. Rehs Galleries sister gallery Rehs Contemporary Galleries operates from the same space. Rehs offers both authentication and appraisals services for art that falls within their scope of expertise.

Rehs Galleries is family owned, with the fourth generation currently running the gallery.

Rehs Galleries was elected a member of the Fine Art Dealers Association in 1995.

== History ==
Rehs Galleries began in the late 1930s when accountant M. Edwin Schillay, encouraged by a client, started buying paintings in bulk in London and shipping them to New York, selling them wholesale to department stores for their in-house art galleries. He specialized in nineteenth-century British paintings, helping introduce Victorian art to American buyers. After World War II, he expanded into other European art.

In the mid-1950s, his wife Ruth opened a retail outlet at 303 Park Avenue South, adding sales to private collectors. By 1960 the firm, now importing thousands of paintings annually, moved to larger premises, and Schillay's son-in-law Joseph B. Rehs joined the business. A year after Schillay's death in 1963, the firm became Schillay & Rehs, Inc. and grew into a major importer of 18th- and 19th-century European paintings, later shifting toward decorative arts and interior designers after an 1978 move to East 63rd Street.

Joseph's son Howard Rehs joined in 1981 after studying art history at New York University, developing expertise in French Academic, Realist, and Barbizon School painting. In 1991 the gallery was renamed Rehs Galleries, Inc. The gallery moved to 5 East 57th Street in 1997 and developed an online presence, including a market newsletter and catalogue raisonné resources.

In the 2000s, Howard's wife Amy took on greater leadership, and the gallery expanded into contemporary Realism, forming Rehs Contemporary Galleries, Inc. in 2012. The gallery relocated to 20 West 55th Street in 2023.

== Gallery exhibitions ==
- Antonio Jacobsen: 1870s, 1880s, 1890s, January 21 – February 11, 1988
- Flowers, Still life, Garden and Summer Views, October 4–24, 1988
- Barry Oretsky, November – December 1989
- Antonio Jacobsen: The Last 25 Years (1897–1921), January 18 – February 9, 1990
- Warner Friedman – Recent Works, June 6–21, 1991
- The Salon & Beyond: An Exhibition of French Paintings, 1880–1940, March 25 – April 25, 1992
