= Eugène Galien-Laloue =

French artist (1854–1941)

Eugène Galien-Laloue (1854-1941)
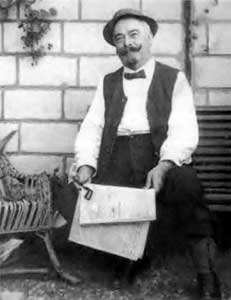
- Known for: Painting
- Movement: Impressionism

Eugène Galien-Laloue (December 11, 1854 – 1941) was a French artist. He was a populariser of street scenes, usually painted in autumn or winter.

== Biography ==
Galien-Laloue was born in Paris of French-Italian parents. His paintings of the early 1900s represent the era in which he lived: a happy, bustling Paris, la Belle Époque, with horse-drawn carriages, trolley cars and its first omnibuses. Galien-Laloue's works are valued not only for their contribution to 20th-century art, but for the actual history, which they document. His work can be seen at the Musée des Beaux-Arts, Louvier; Musée des Beaux-Arts, La Rochelle; Mulhouse, France.

A typical Galien-Laloue painting depicts sidewalks and avenues crowded with people or tourists mingling before the capital's monuments. He also painted the landscapes of Normandy and Seine-et-Marne, as well as military scenes he was commissioned to produce in 1914. The Republic of France selected Galien-Laloue to work as a 'war artist,' both during the Franco-Prussian War and World War I, chiefly in watercolor.

Galien-Laloue was in exclusive contract with one gallery. He used other names: "L.Dupuy", "Juliany", "E.Galiany", "Lievin", "G.L" "Dumoutier" and "P.Mattig," possibly to market his works outside of this contract.

== Gallery ==
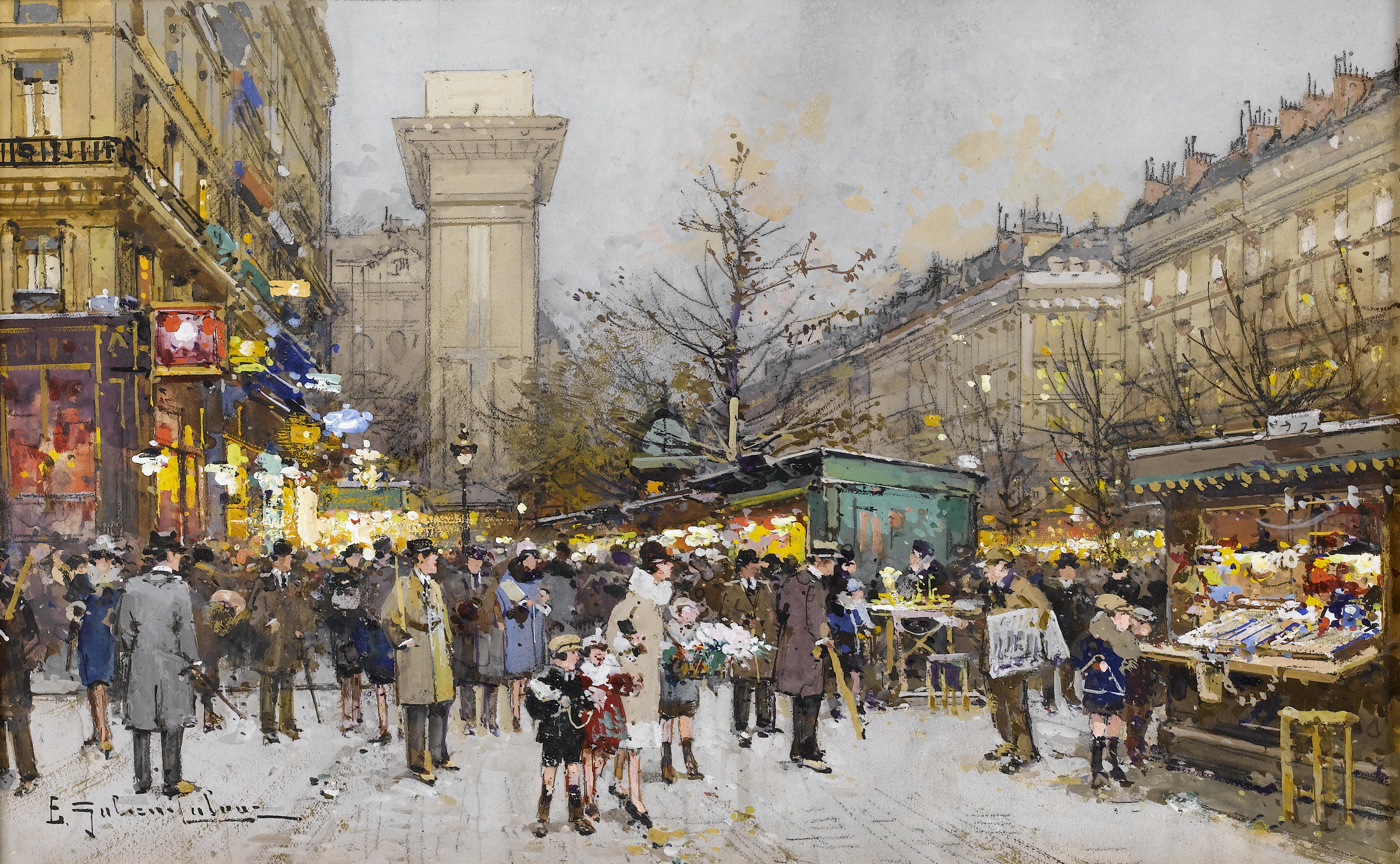
Paris Porte Saint-Denis

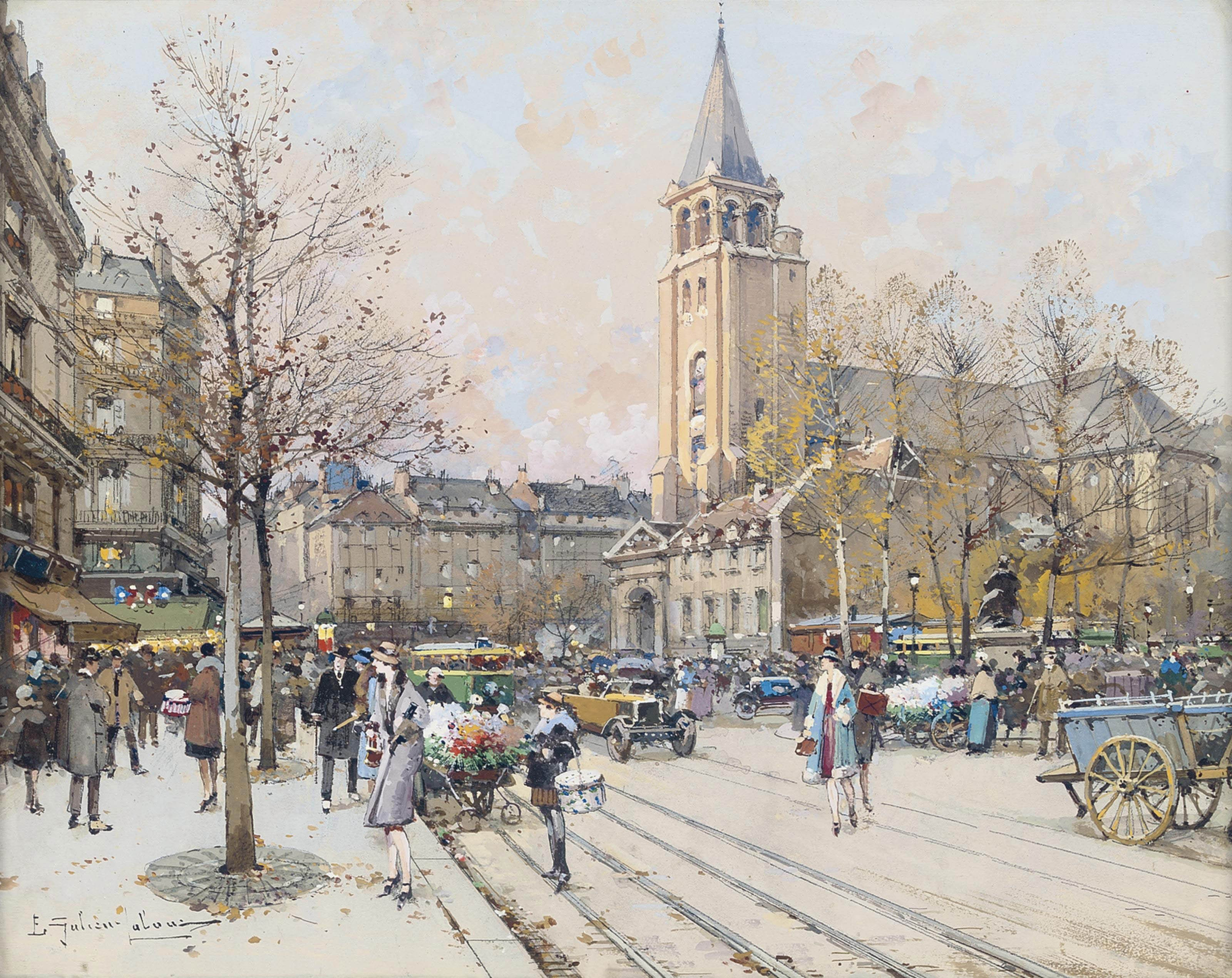
Paris Eglise de St-Germain-des-Prés

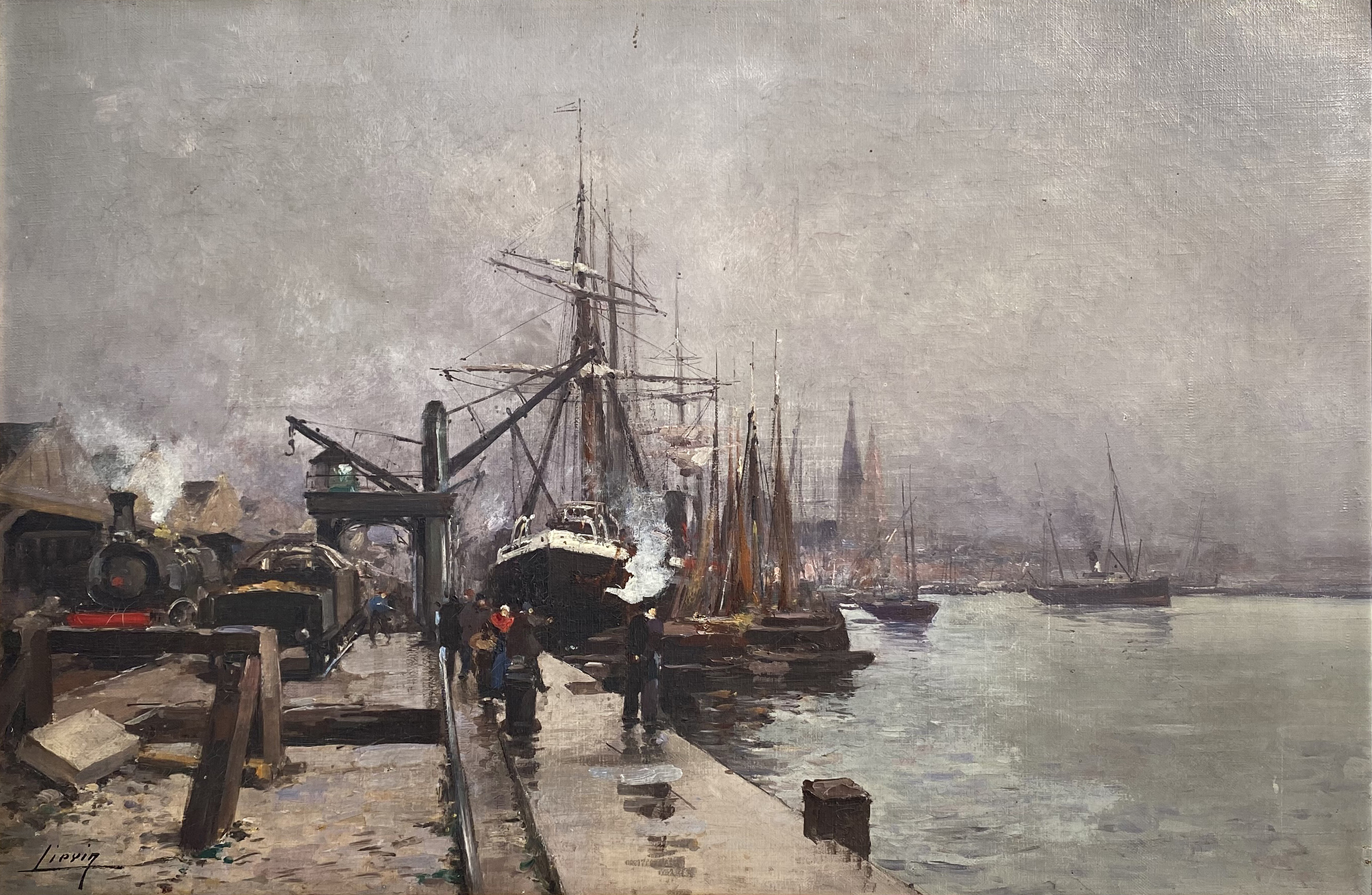
Dans le port d'hiver

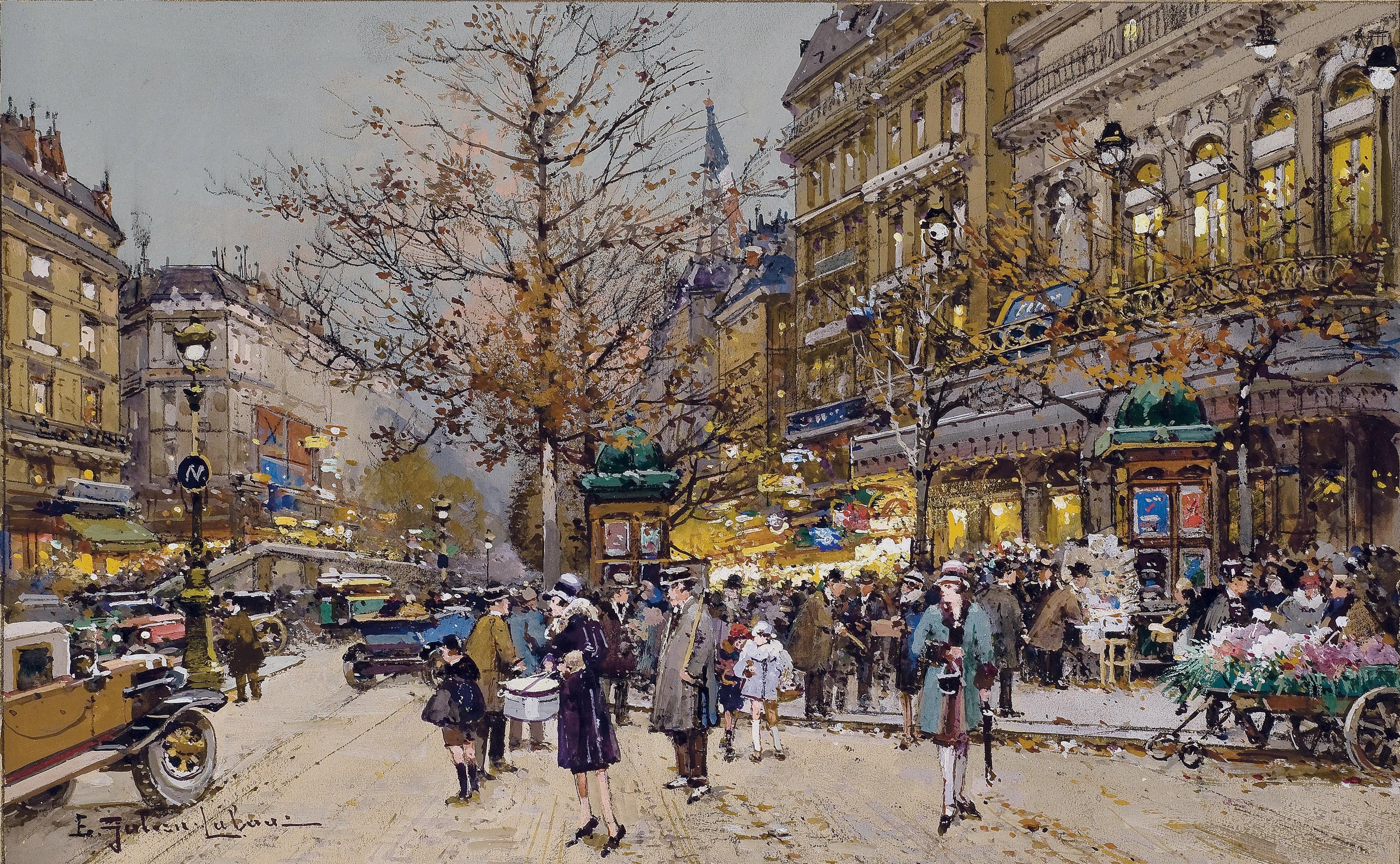
Paris Boulevard Bonne Nouvelle

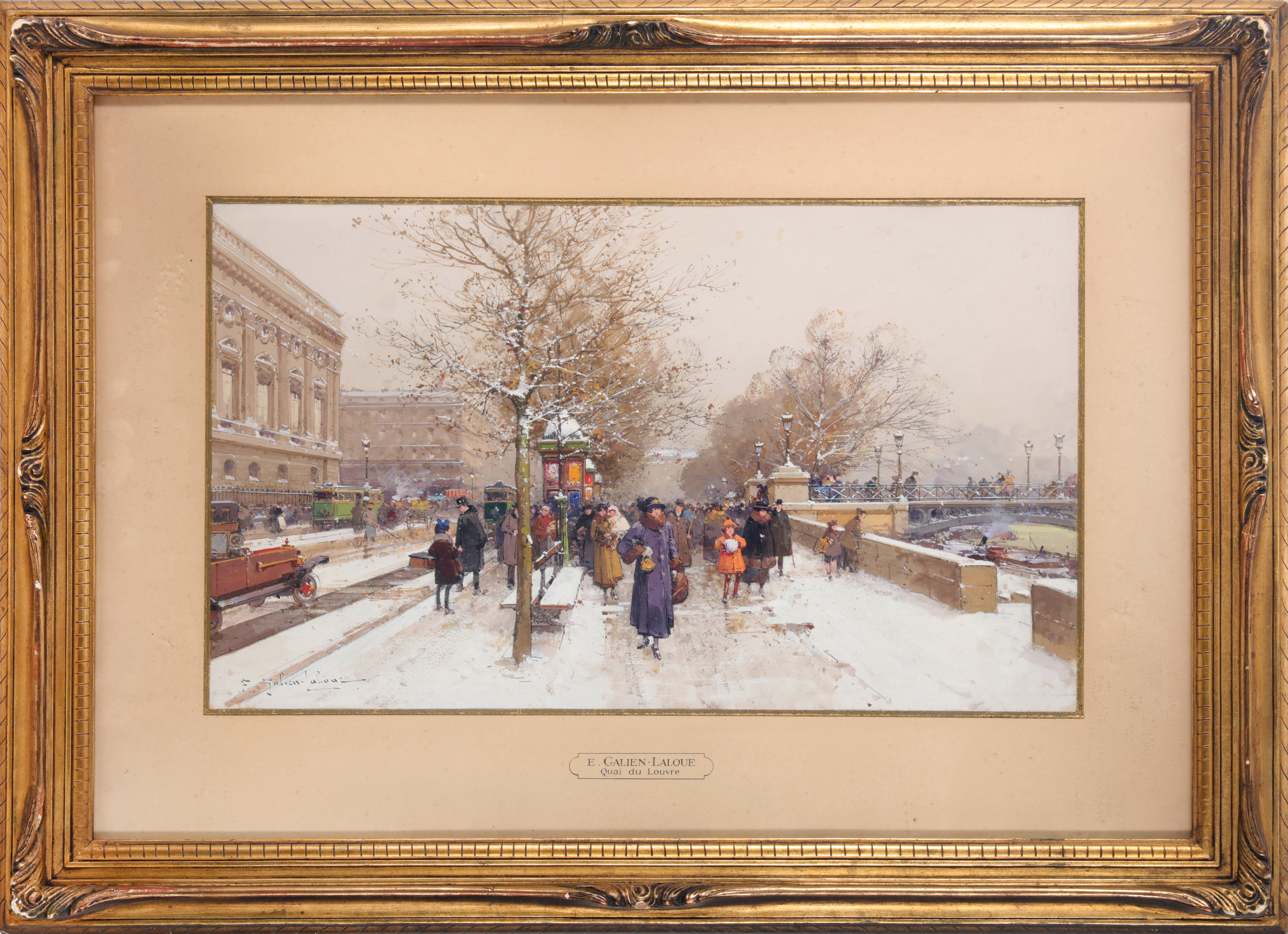
Quai du Louvre (watercolour)

== See also ==
- Fin de siècle
- Gay Nineties
- Gilded Age
- Roaring Twenties
