= Edouard Cortès =

French painter (1882–1969)

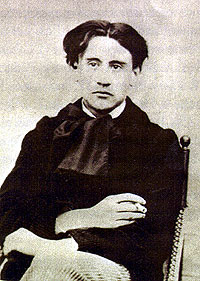
- Edouard Cortès as a young man
- Born: 6 August 1882; Lagny-sur-Marne, France
- Died: November 26, 1969 (aged 87); Lagny-sur-Marne, France
- Education: His father Antonio Cortès, École des Beaux-Arts
- Known for: Cityscapes, Paris

Edouard Léon Cortès (1882–1969) was a French post-impressionist painter of French and Spanish ancestry. He is known as "Le Poète Parisien de la Peinture" ("the Parisian Poet of Painting") because of his diverse Paris cityscapes in a variety of weather and night settings.

== Personal life ==
Cortes was born on August 6, 1882, in Lagny-sur-Marne, about twenty miles east of Paris. His father, Antonio Cortés, had been a painter for the Spanish Royal Court.

In 1914 Cortès married Fernande Joyeuse, with whom he had a daughter, Jacqueline Simone, in 1916. The depiction of a woman with a child is repeated throughout his work, a possible reference to Joyeuse and Jacqueline.

Although Cortès was a pacifist, when war came close to his native village he was compelled to enlist in a French Infantry Regiment at the age of 32. Sent to the front lines, Cortès was wounded by a bayonet, evacuated to a military hospital, and awarded the Croix de Guerre. After recovery he was reassigned to use his artistic talent to sketch enemy positions. Later in life his convictions led him to refuse the Légion d'Honneur from the French Government. In 1919 he was demobilized.

His wife died in 1918, and the following year he married his sister-in-law, Lucienne Joyeuse.

Cortès lived a simple life amid a close circle of friends. He died on November 26, 1969, in Lagny, and has a street named in his honour.

== Painting history ==
At the age of 17, Cortès began his studies at the École des Beaux-Arts in Paris. His first exhibition in 1901 brought him immediate recognition. Cortès stressed his independence. Once, in responding to a journalist who asked if he was a student of Luigi Loir, he replied in pun: "Non, seul élève de moi-même." ("No, a student of myself only.")

His works were first exhibited in North America in 1945 and he subsequently achieved even greater success. In his last year of life he was awarded the prestigious Prix Antoine-Quinson from the Salon de Vincennes.

== Lost and stolen paintings ==
On November 30, 2000, four paintings by Cortès were recovered in Kalispell, Montana, following an eight-month investigation conducted by the FBI's San Francisco Division. The recovered paintings were stolen in 1988 during a burglary at the Simic Gallery in Carmel, California.

In 2008, a lost Cortès painting of a Paris street scene was discovered amongst donated items at a Goodwill Industries thrift store in Easton, Maryland. After an alert store manager noticed that it was a signed original, the painting was subsequently auctioned for $40,600 (US) at Sotheby's. In 2019, a previously unknown work, Place de la République en Soir was discovered in Paris.
