= Peter Berchet =

French painter

Peter Berchet (also Pierre Berchet; 1659 – 1 January 1720) was a French painter, resident in England from 1685. His main work was decorating the interior of houses of the nobility.

== Life ==
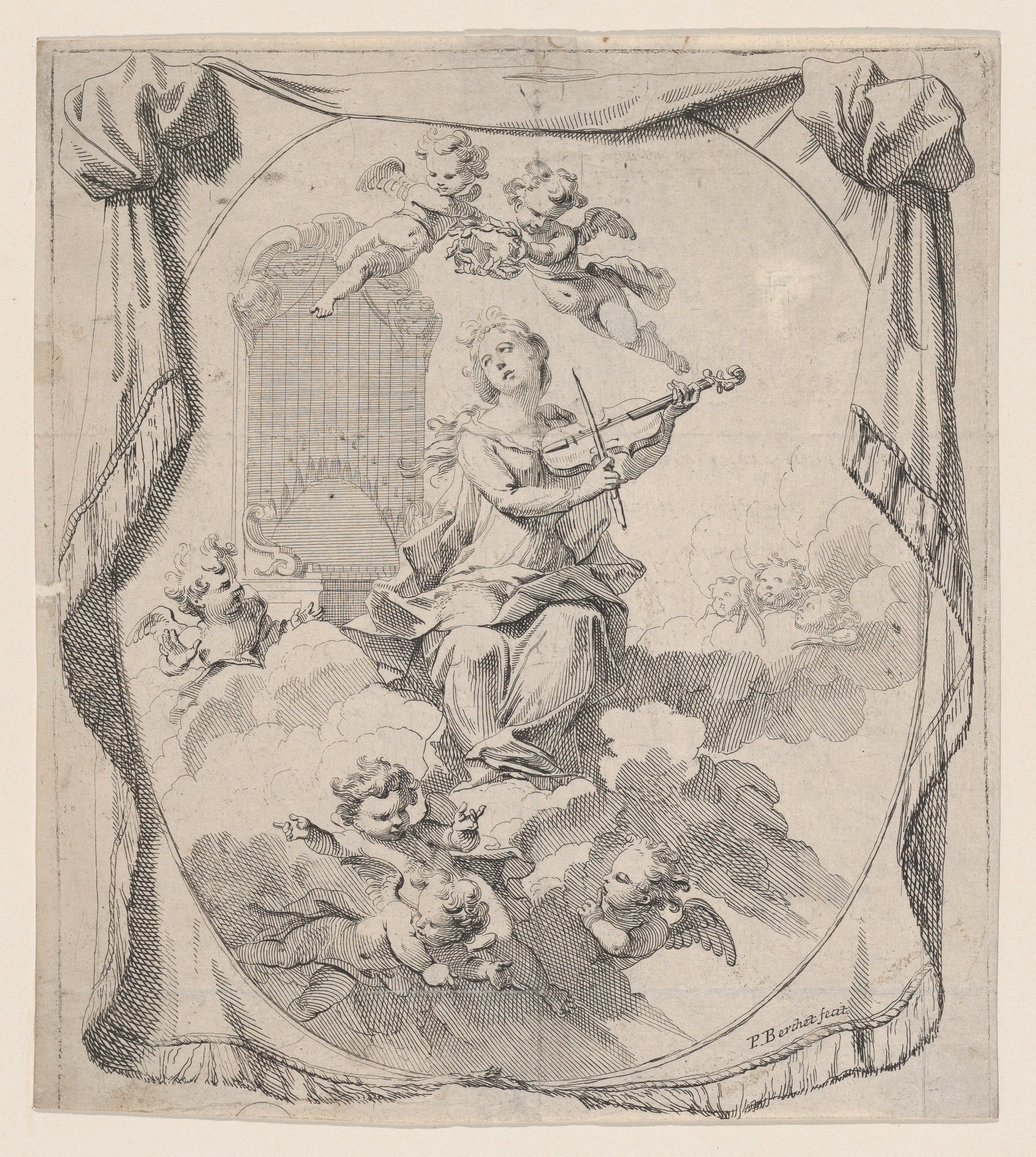
St Cecilia in the clouds playing the violin

Berchet was born in France in 1659. He studied under Charles de La Fosse, and at the age of eighteen obtained employment in the royal palaces. He came to England in 1681 to work with Jacob Rambour, a French painter of architecture, for Antonio Verrio at Windsor Castle, and afterwards returned to France. On paying a second visit to England he received a commission from King William III to assist in the decoration of his new palace Het Loo in the Netherlands, working for Daniel Marot, where he was occupied for fifteen months.

After the revocation in 1685 of the Edict of Nantes, Berchet, who was a Huguenot, settled in England, where he found extensive occupation in the houses of the nobility. He painted the walls and ceiling of the staircase of the Duke of Schomberg's house in Pall Mall, and the picture of the Ascension on the ceiling of the chapel of Trinity College, Oxford. During the latter part of his life, because of ill health, he confined himself to small easel pictures, which were chiefly of a mythological character. He died in Marylebone, where he had long resided, on 1 January 1720, and was buried at St Marylebone Parish Church.

There are engravings from Berchet's pictures by John Smith, John Simon, and George Vertue, and he also etched a few plates from his own designs, amongst them St Cecilia in the clouds playing the violin, a ticket for a concert, 1696.
