= Nicholas Byer =

Norwegian painter

- Born: Norway
- Died: 1681
- Occupation: Painter

Nicholas Byer (died 1681) was a Norwegian painter.

== Biography ==
Byer was a native of Drontheim in Norway. He practised portrait and historical painting, and on coming to England found a steady patron in Sir William Temple, at whose seat at Sheen, in Surrey, he lived for three or four years (Walpole, Anecdotes of Painting, ed. Wornum, ii. 479). His reputation as a face-painter must have been considerable; several persons of distinction, including some members of the royal family, sat to him. Dying at Sheen in 1681 he is said to have been the first person buried at St. Clement Danes after the rebuilding of the church (Redgrave, Dictionary of Artists, 1878, p. 66).
