= Edmund Lilly =

Edmund Lilly may refer to:

- Edmund Lilly (academic administrator)
- Edmund Lilly (painter)
