= Edmund Lilly (painter) =

English painter

Edmund Lilly (also spelled Edmund Lilley or Edmond Lilly; fl. from c. 1695, died 1716) was an English painter, most notable for his portraits.

Originating from Norfolk, Lilly was known to have painted some history pieces and still lifes; no surviving works of such subjects are known, however. As a portraitist, he is known for being extensively patronized by Queen Anne, both before and after her accession in 1702. Anne, who apparently preferred Lilly's style to these of his more notable contemporaries Godfrey Kneller and Michael Dahl, commissioned full-length state portraits of herself and her family from him, reproduced for leading members of the nobility; the c. 1698 portrait in the Windsor Castle of the Queen's short-lived son, the Duke of Gloucester, is a signed example of these. The Queen sat for Lilly at least twice after her accession, with the full-length portrait in the Blenheim Palace, published as a mezzotint made by John Simon, being particularly notable; whereas the 19th-century author Samuel Redgrave denoted it as an "indifferent work, weak in drawing and expression, cold and grey in colour," the Dictionary of Art co-author Richard Jeffree defined it as the "most grandiose" of Anne's state portraits, showing the influence of John Closterman.

Other works by Lilly include the strongly characterized Edward Tyson of c. 1695, now in the Royal College of Physicians, and Jeremy Collier published as a mezzotint made by William Faithorne the Younger; Lilly's last known works, both signed and dated 1707, are Sir Whitmore Acton and Lady Acton (sold at Christie's in April 1929), reminiscent of Johann Kerseboom's manner. Lilly was buried at Richmond, Surrey, on 25 May 1716, and was survived by wife, Katherine Hindley. In his will, proved 11 July 1716, Lilly left his property to relatives, with several paintings bequeathed to his nephew; the will details both titles and dimensions of the bequeathed works, including portraits, religious and mythological subjects.

== Gallery ==
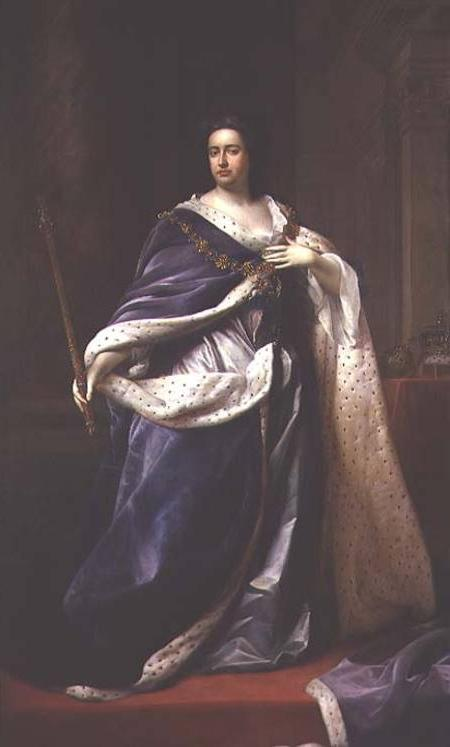
Queen Anne, 1703, Blenheim Palace, Woodstock, Oxfordshire

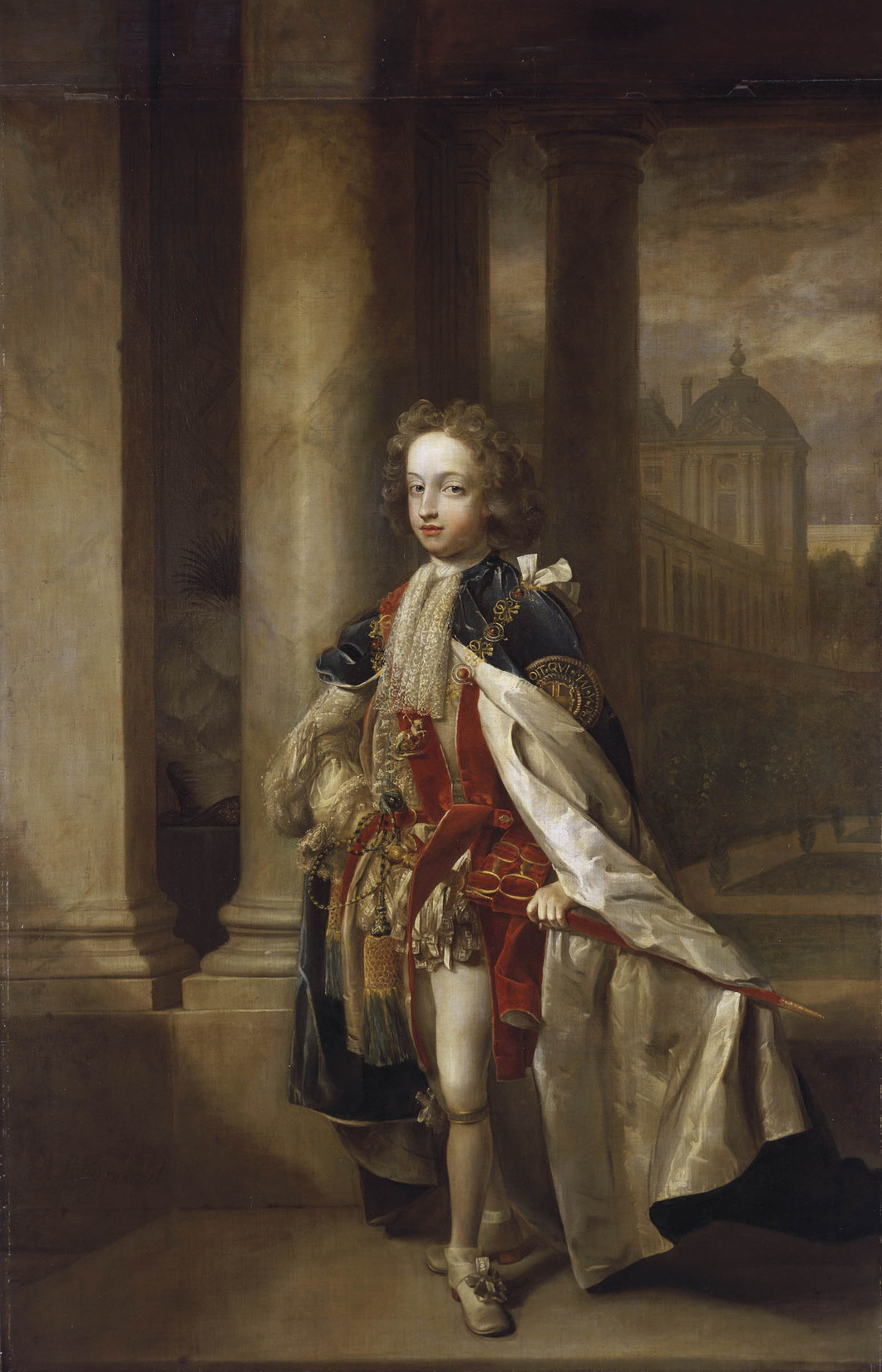
William, Duke of Gloucester, c. 1698, Windsor Castle

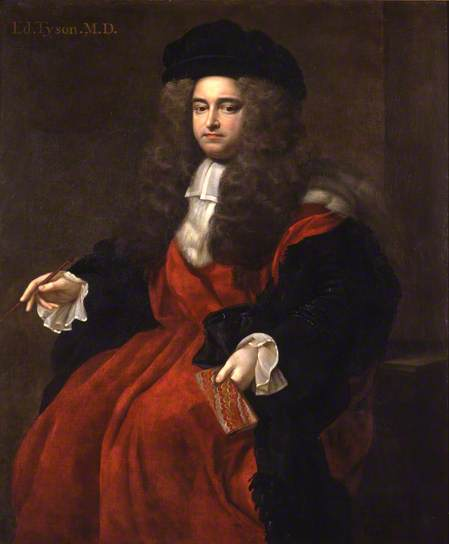
Edward Tyson, c. 1695, Royal College of Physicians, London
