= John Simon (engraver) =

English mezzotint engraver and print publisher

- Born: Jean Simon c. 1675; Province of Normandy, Kingdom of France
- Died: 22 September 1751 (aged 75–76); London, Kingdom of Great Britain
- Known for: Mezzotint prints

Jean Simon, anglicized as John Simon (also spelled Simons; (Note: In A History of Mezzotinto of 1786, James Chelsum used the spelling Simons, and so do the 1826 and 1849 editions of George Vertue's A Catalogue of Engravers, published as part of Horace Walpole's Anecdotes of Painting in England; the original 1765 edition of Vertue's Catalogue, as well as the subsequent 1879 edition of Walpole's Anecdotes, use the spelling Simon.) c. 1675–1751) was an English mezzotint engraver and print publisher of French Huguenot birth, particularly known for his portraits. Notably associated with the German-born portrait painter Godfrey Kneller, Simon had an active career that spanned at least three and a half decades, and was regarded as one of the mezzotint medium's most prolific masters of his generation, along with the older contemporaneous master John Smith.

== Life ==
Born Jean Simon c. 1675 in Normandy, he was said to belong to a Huguenot artist family that was connected to the protestant church at Charenton-le-Pont near Paris. In Paris, he studied line engraving. Early in the 18th century, (Note: Exact time of Simon's moving to England remains imprecise. Following Vertue's account published by Walpole, 18th- and 19th-century authors wrote that Simon settled in London "some years" before the death of Smith. In later publications, a variety of differently specified datings is given. In 1990, Carol Wax attributed Simon's arrival to 1708. In light of Simon's Huguenot background, it has been widely thought that his moving was related to persecutions that followed the Edict of Fontainebleau of 1685. In a different opinion, the Hungarian-born scholar Frederick Antal names Simon among French-born printmakers brought in England by Claude Du Bosc.) Simon moved to London and began working in mezzotint, quickly adapting to the market demands; his earliest known prints were published from Cross Lane, Long Acre, during the middle years of Queen Anne's reign. In c. 1708–1709, Simon gained the attention of Godfrey Kneller, who fell out with his principal engraver, John Smith. Until the dispute with Smith was settled, Simon obtained several of Kneller's commissions. This assured Simon's reputation, allowing him to become a founding member of the Academy for Artists in Great Queen Street, set up under Kneller's patronage in 1711. In his notebooks, George Vertue listed Simon among leading mezzotint engravers working in London, along with Smith, John Faber the Elder, John Faber the Younger, and George White; from Vertue's notebooks, it is also known that Simon was an associate of the renowned Rose and Crown Club.

From early in his career, Simon began working extensively for the prominent print seller Edward Cooper (fl. 1682–1725). Particularly noted was a c. 1707–1710 publication by Cooper of a set of mezzotints by Simon after the Raphael Cartoons in Hampton Court Palace, devoted to the 2nd Duke of Devonshire. After Cooper's death in 1725, Simon succeeded him as chief publisher of Michael Dahl's paintings. Beside from Cooper, Simon was employed by such notable publishers as Thomas Bowles II (c. 1689–1767) and John Overton (c. 1639–1713); since c. 1720, he mostly published his own prints from a series of addresses around Covent Garden. After at least three and a half decades, Simon retired from active printmaking c. 1742, nine years before his death on 22 September 1751; (Note: Various publications, ranging from the late 18th century to the late 20th century, date Simon's death c. 1755. In the Benezit Dictionary of Artists, Simon's death is dated 1754.) his remaining stock of plates was sold in November 1761.

== Work ==
Simon was a prolific printmaker, (Note: In the middle 19th century, the French librarian Charles Le Blanc (1817–1865) catalogued 195 prints made by Simon; later in that century, the Irish mezzotint amateur John Chaloner Smith described 177 mezzotints by Simon. Various 20th-century sources estimate about 200 prints made by Simon.) particularly noted for portraits made after Kneller, Dahl, Thomas Gibson, Thomas Murray, Philippe Mercier, Enoch Seeman, and others. Subjects of Simon's portraits represented all points of the political spectrum, including the Duke of Marlborough, Robert Walpole, Francis Atterbury, Lord North and Grey, the 10th Earl Marischal, and the Duke of Ormond; similarly, portraits of members of the then reigning House of Hanover were balanced by those of exiled members of the House of Stuart. Simon also engraved sets of the Four Mohawk Kings after John Verelst, published in 1710, and of twenty-four Poets and Philosophers of England published on six plates c. 1727. Aside from portraiture, Simon took biblical, historical, and decorative subjects; alongside the Raphael Cartoons, these include Christ Restoring the Blind Man's Sight by Louis Laguerre, Four Elements by Jacopo Amigoni, Four Seasons by Rosalba Carriera. He was also known to make prints after Antoine Watteau, Jean-Baptiste-Siméon Chardin, Peter Paul Rubens, Federico Barocci, Sébastien Leclerc, and others. There are mezzotints by Simon made likely of his own invention, or after that by unknown authors; these include a portrait of the Russian statesman Alexander Danilovich, Prince Menshikov; The Judgment of Paris, a mythological subject; and A Winter Evening's Conversation, a satyrical print.

According to later authors, Simon had a "spare and powerful" style influenced by that of Smith, yet contrasting with the latter, including cases the both worked after the same original. In comparison to Smith, Simon was known to use a less close grounding of plates, with laying small cross-hatched lines; In that relation, Simon's skill was regarded as inferior to Smith's in technical terms such as brightance, drawing of the figures, and details; nonetheless, Simon closely rivaled Smith in his finest works. In spite of aforementioned issues, Simon's prints were esteemed among "the most successful mezzotints of their day". In the 20th century, the English authors Malcolm Charles Salaman and the 3rd Baron Killanin credited Simon for bringing a "fresh artistic sensitiveness" and, overall, a French influence into the mezzotint medium, respectively. Peter Pelham, a pioneering American painter and mezzotint engraver, was an apprentice of Simon in London.

== Gallery ==
Selected prints by John Simon
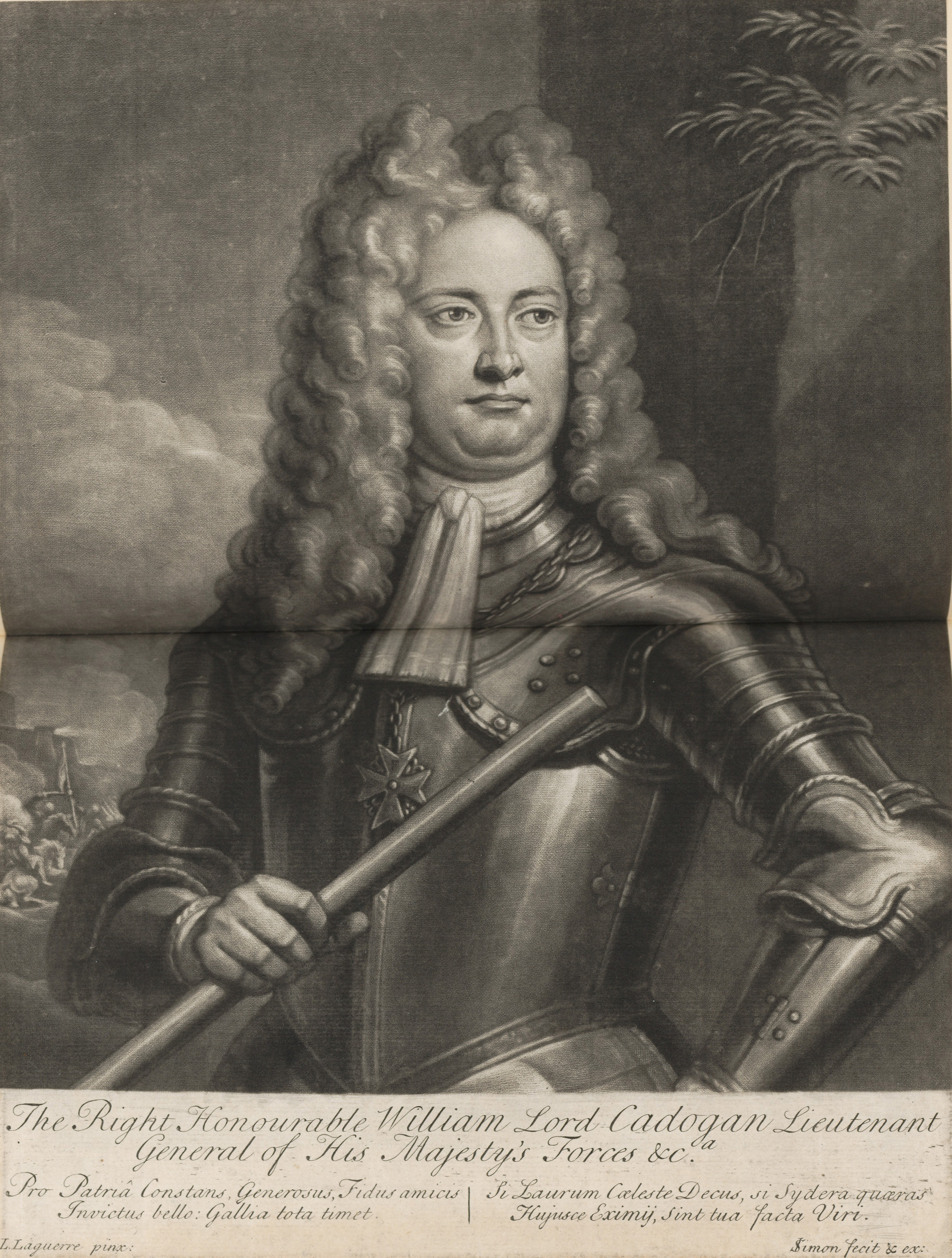
William Cadogan, 1st Earl Cadogan, after Louis Laguerre; Houghton Library, Cambridge

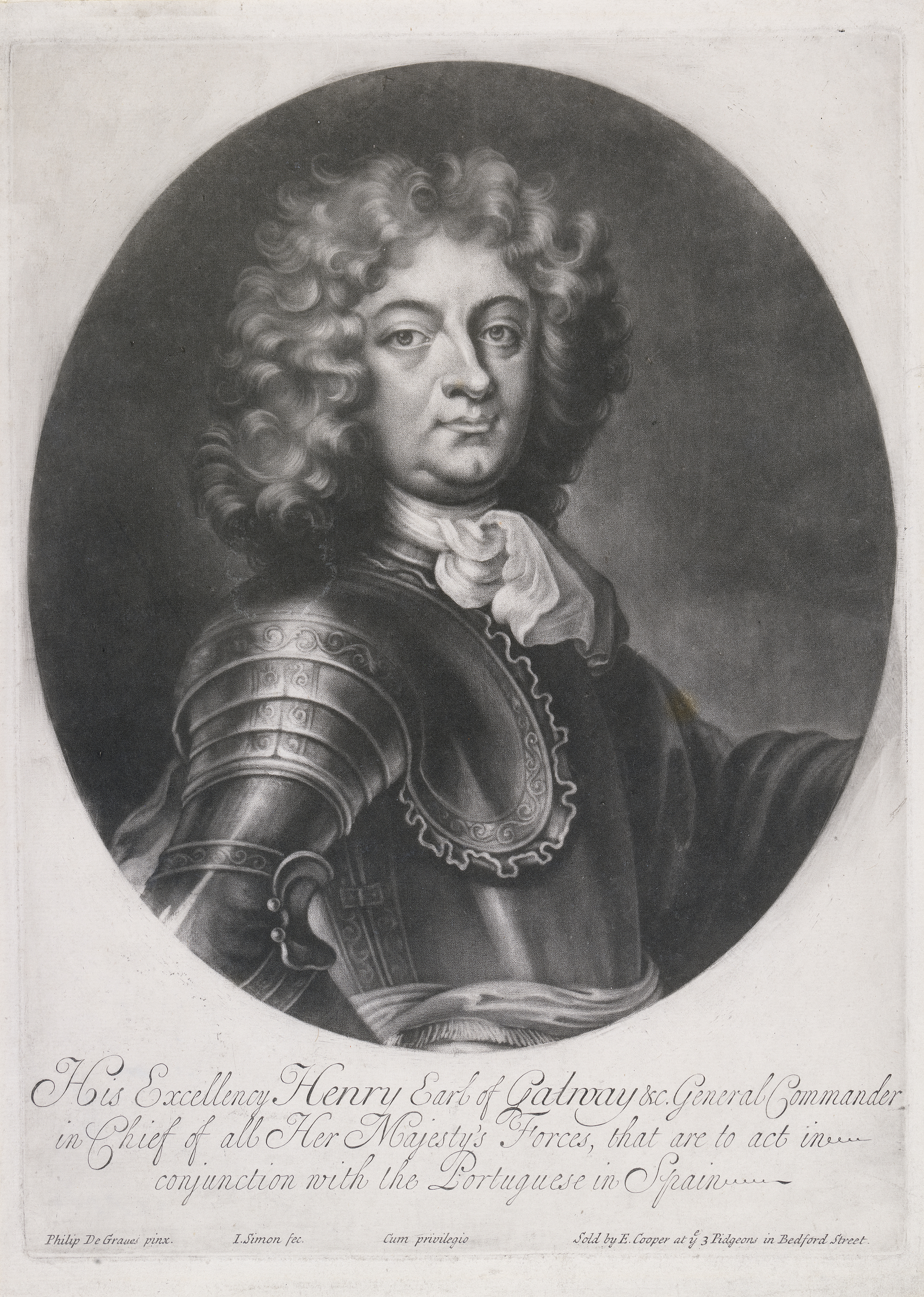
Henri de Massue, Earl of Galway, after Philip de Graves; National Gallery of Ireland, Dublin

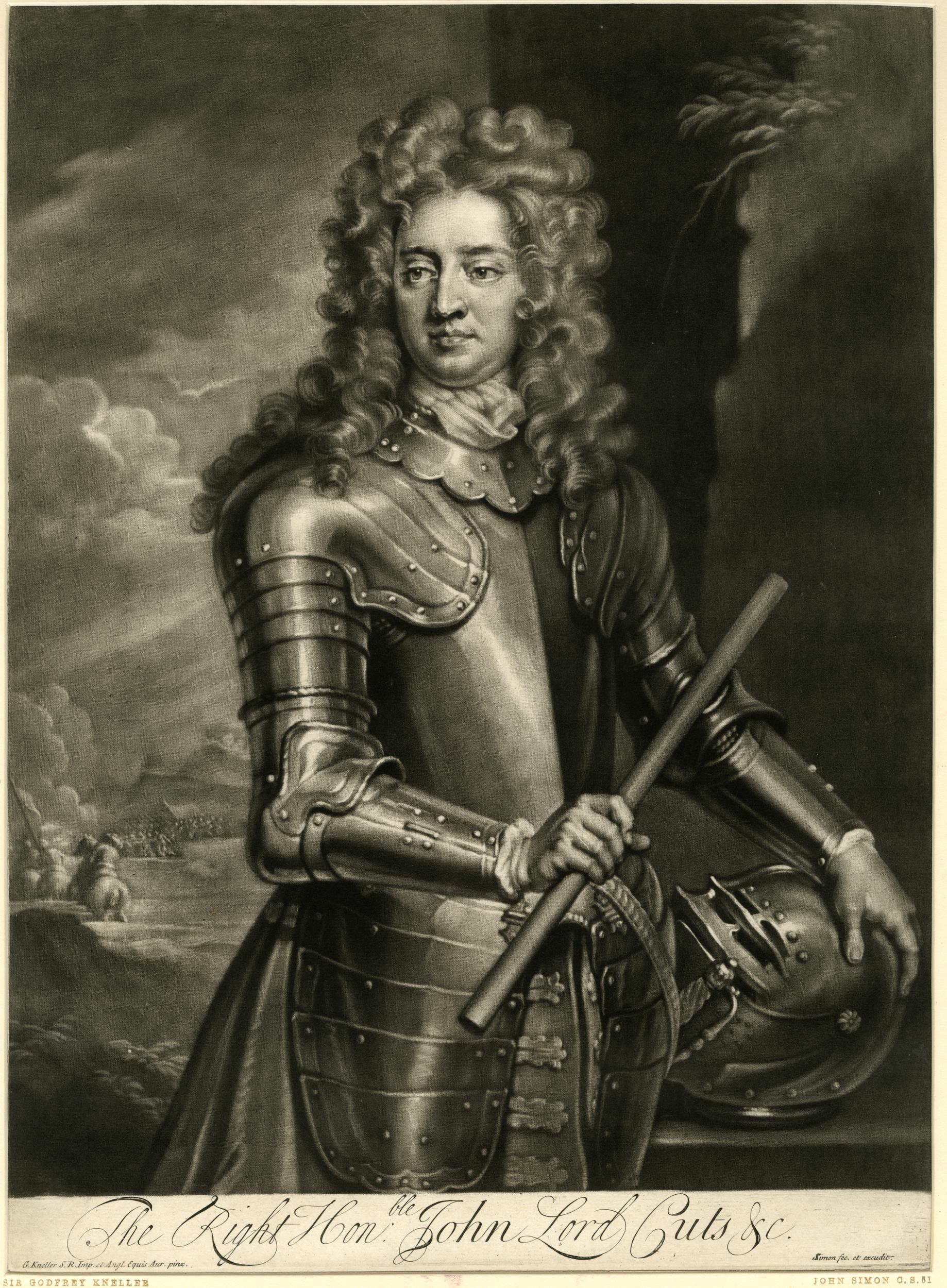
John Cutts, 1st Baron Cutts, after Godfrey Kneller; British Museum, London

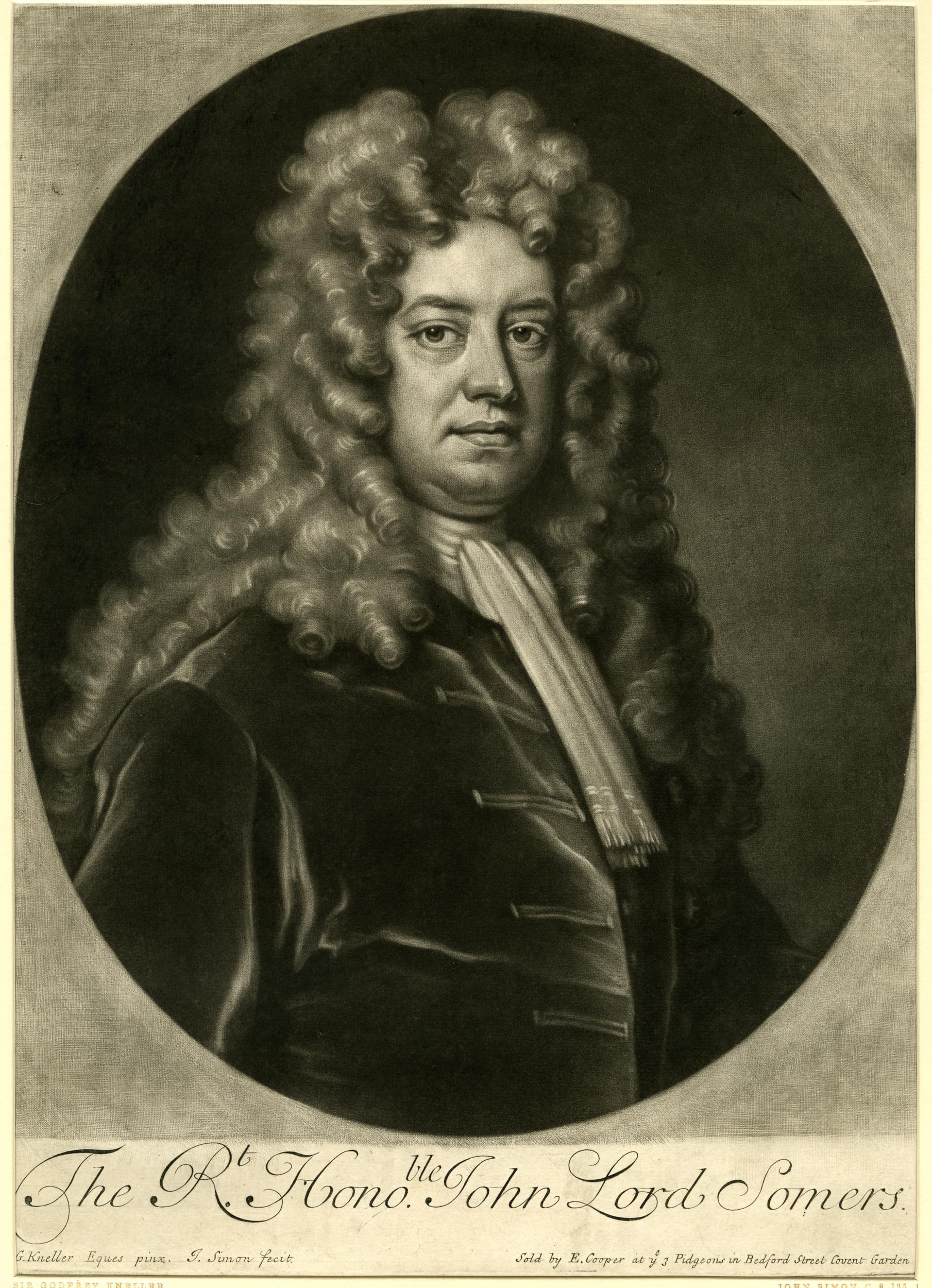
John Somers, 1st Baron Somers, after Godfrey Kneller; British Museum, London

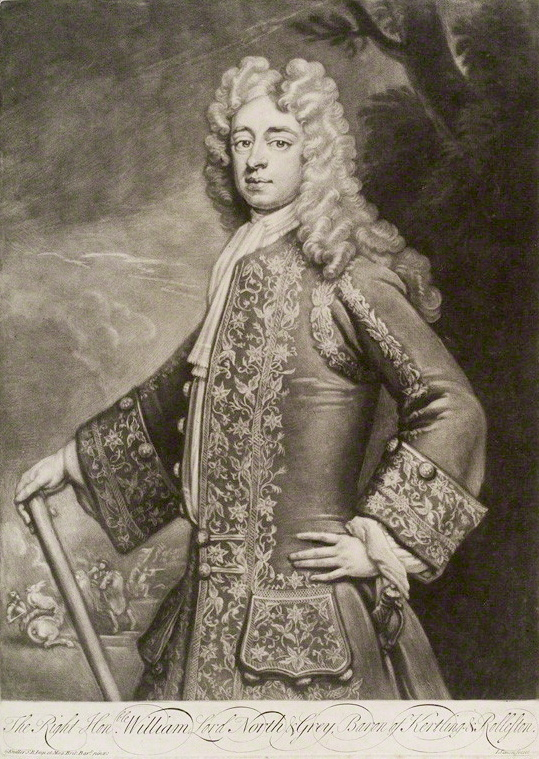
William North, 6th Baron North, after Godfrey Kneller; National Portrait Gallery, London

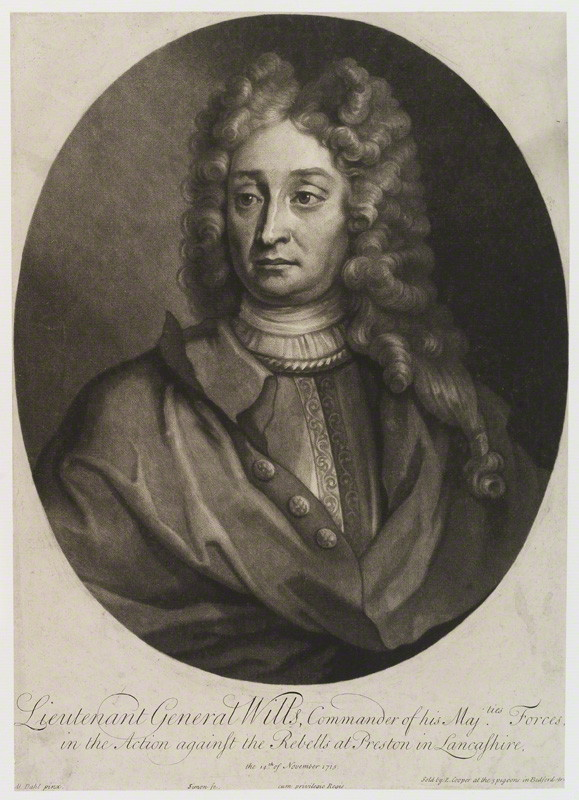
Charles Wills, after Michael Dahl; National Portrait Gallery, London

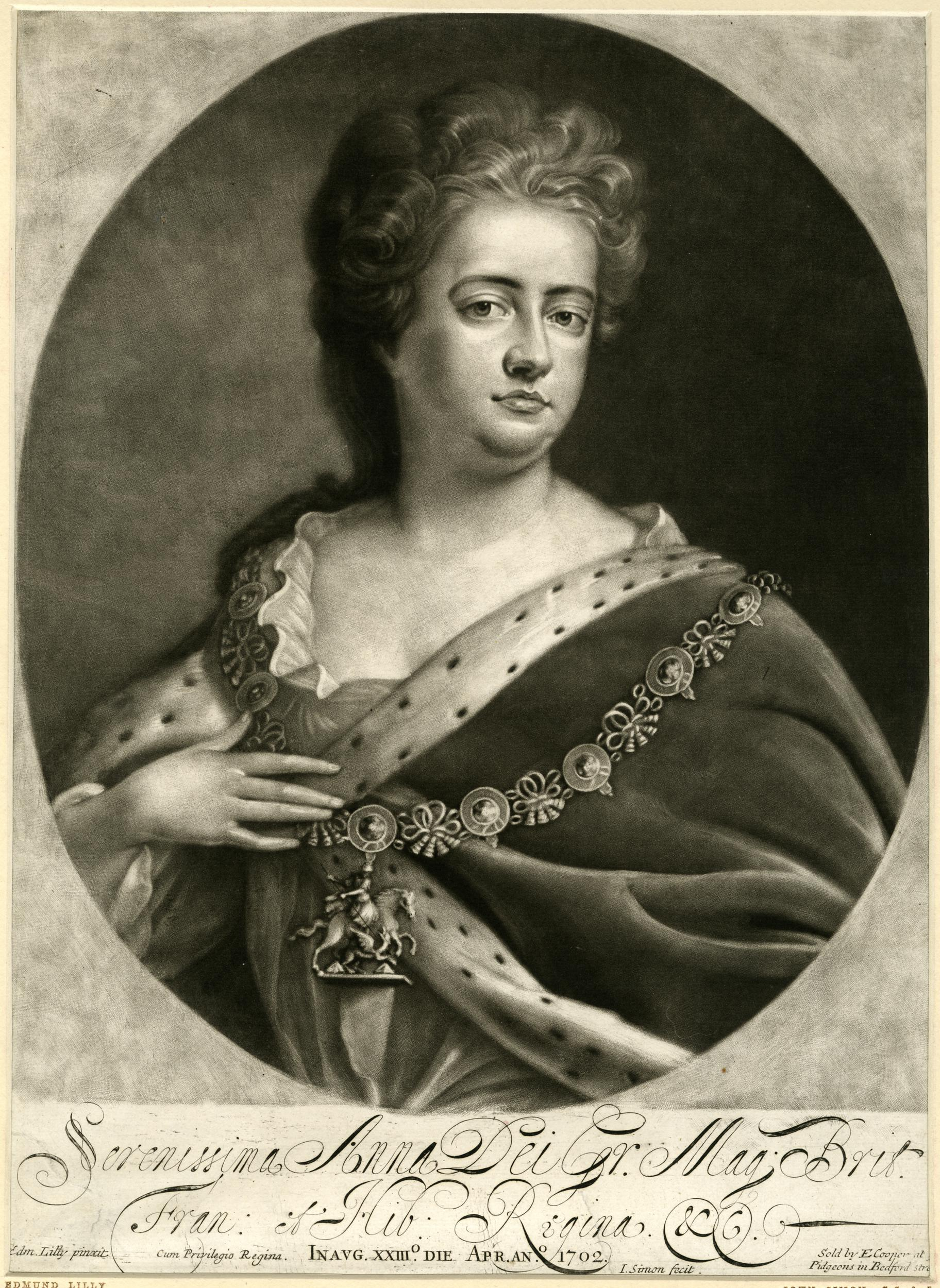
Queen Anne, after Edmund Lilly; British Museum, London

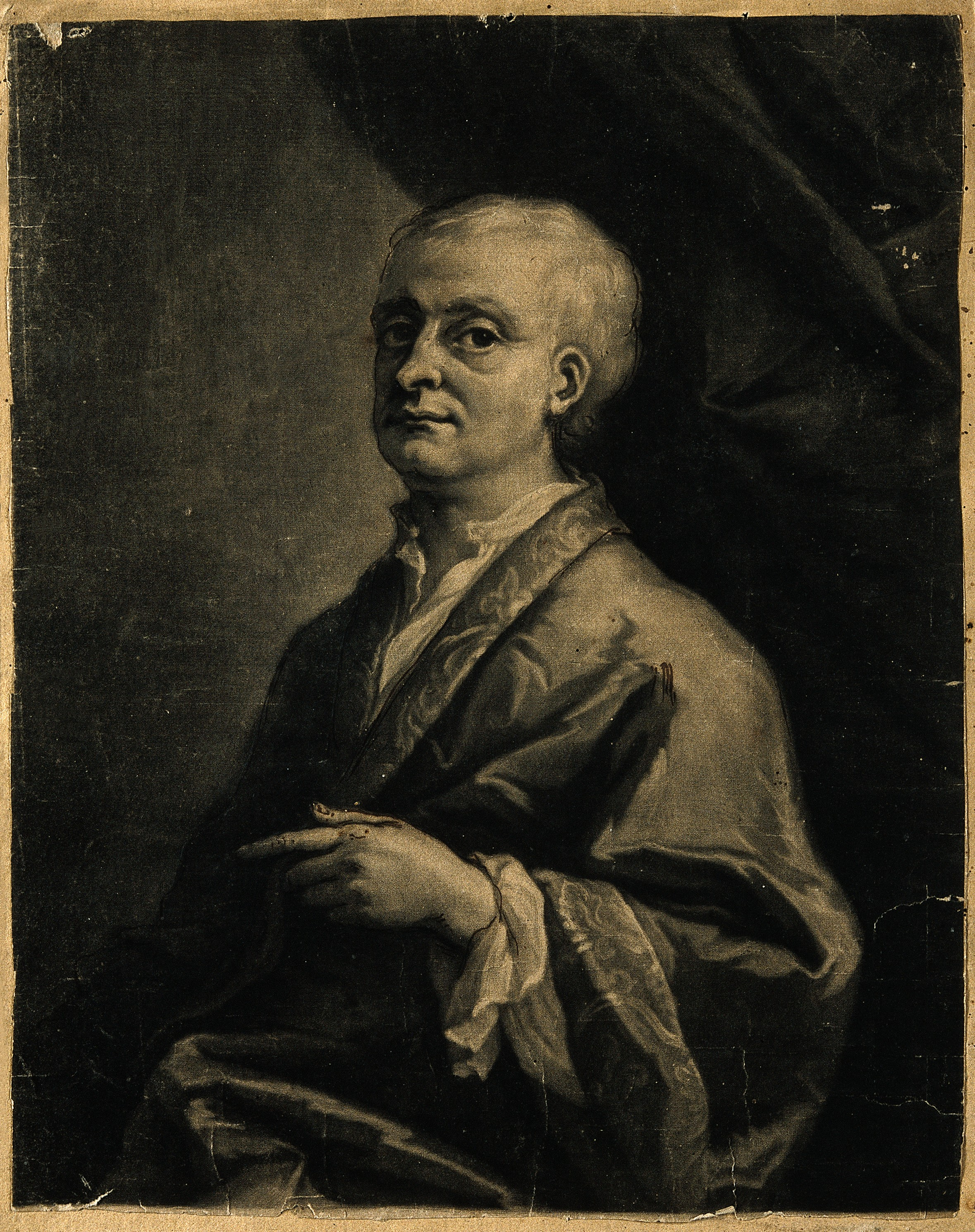
Isaac Newton, after James Thornhill; Wellcome Collection, London

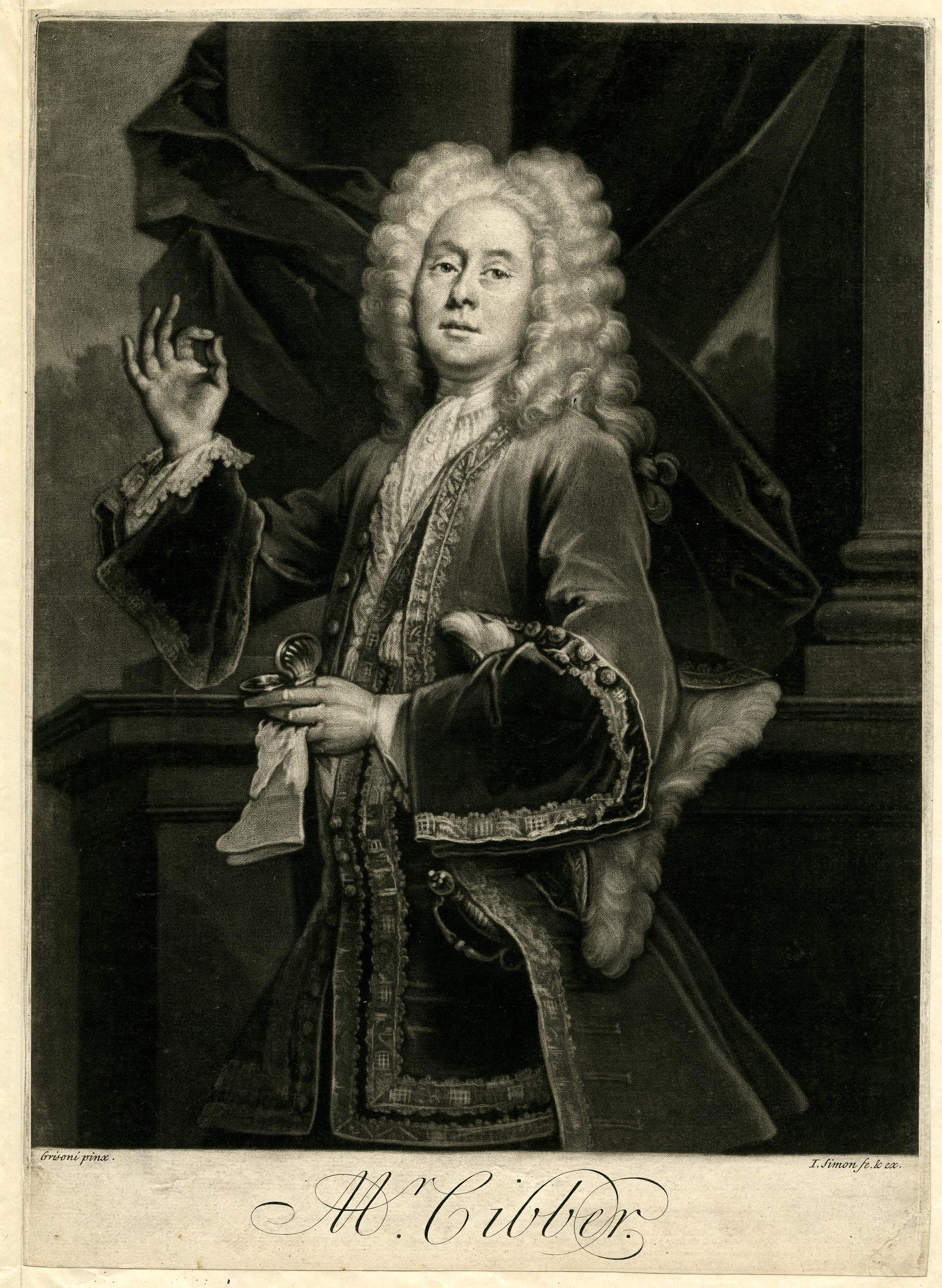
Colley Cibber, after Giuseppe Grisoni; British Museum, London

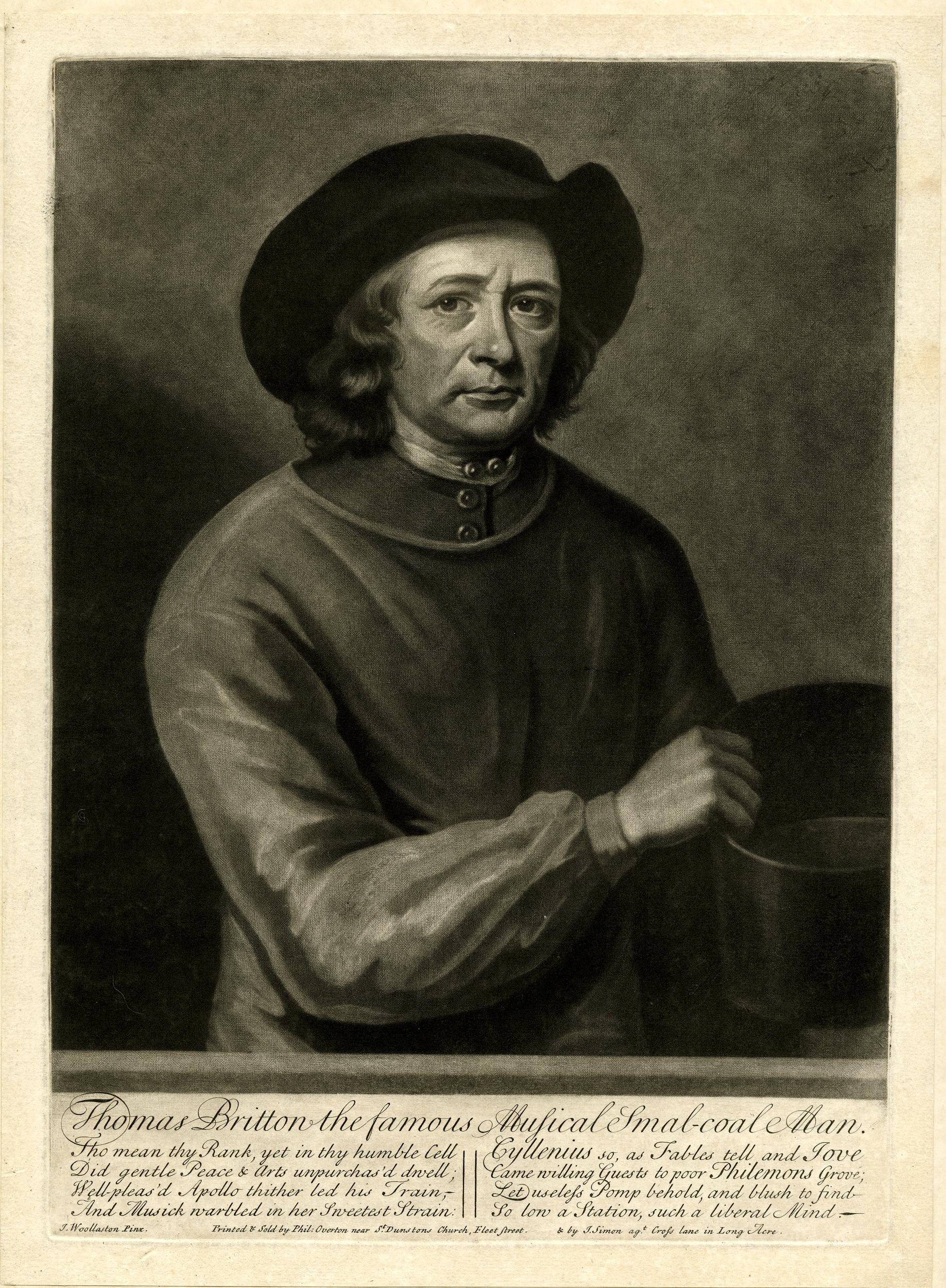
Thomas Britton, after John Wollaston I; British Museum, London

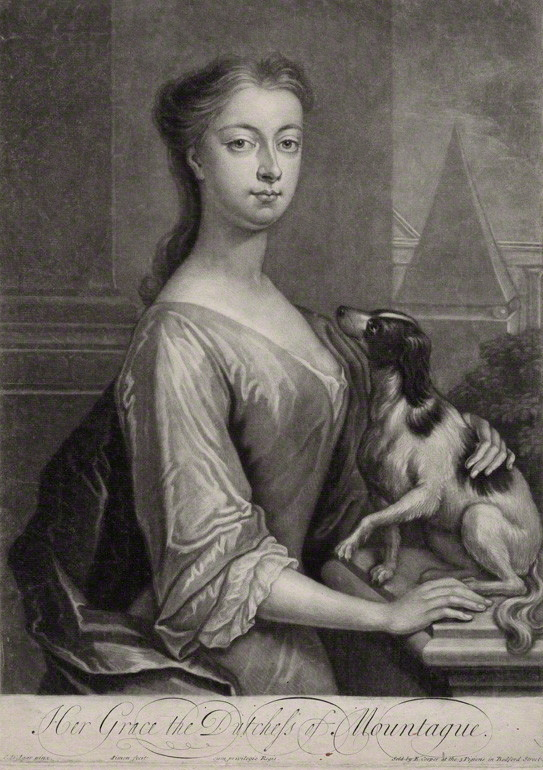
Mary Montagu, Duchess of Montagu, after Charles d'Agar; National Portrait Gallery, London

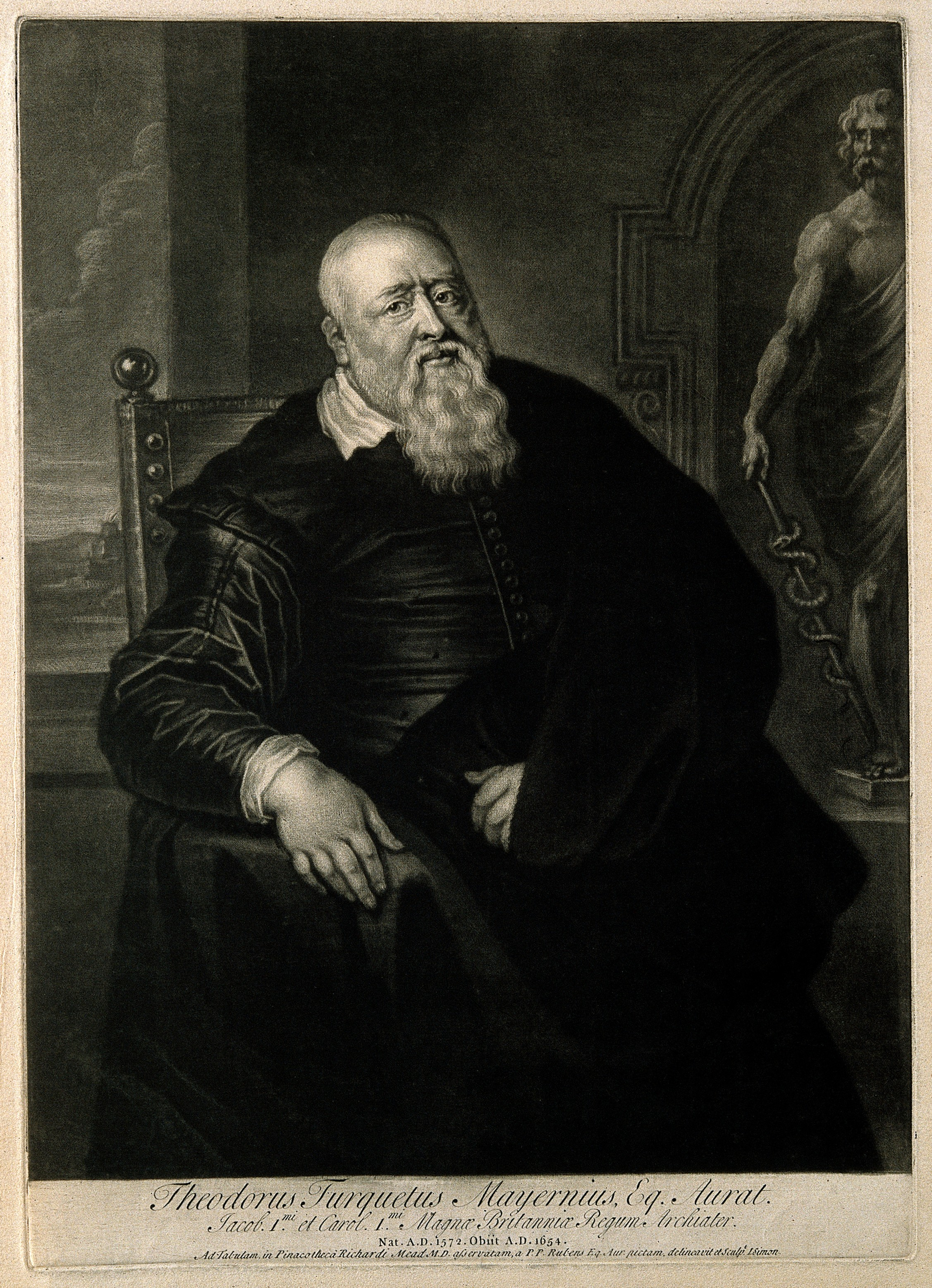
Sir Théodore Turquet de Mayerne, after Peter Paul Rubens; Wellcome Collection, London

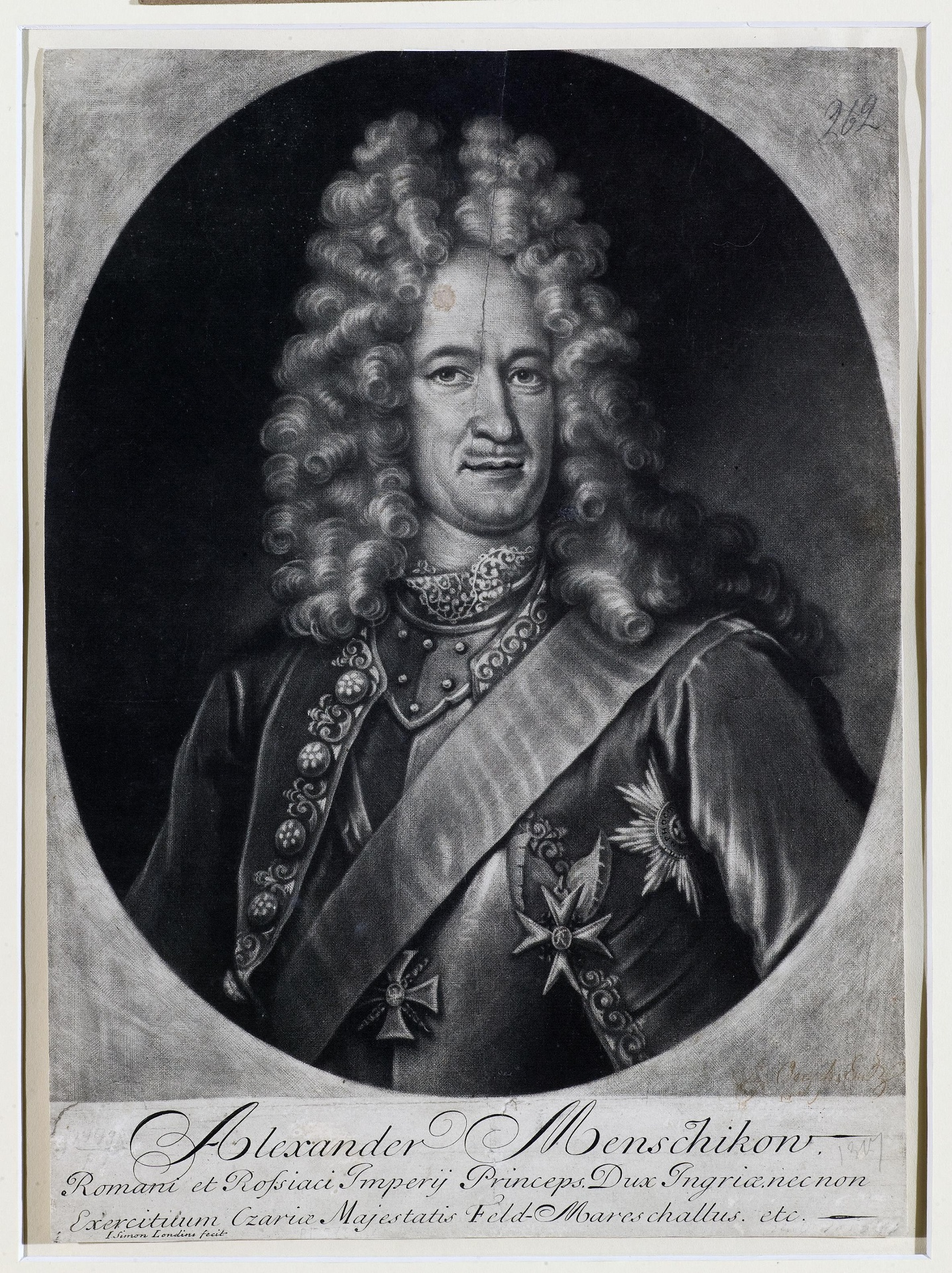
Prince Alexander Menshikov; Hermitage Museum, Saint Petersburg

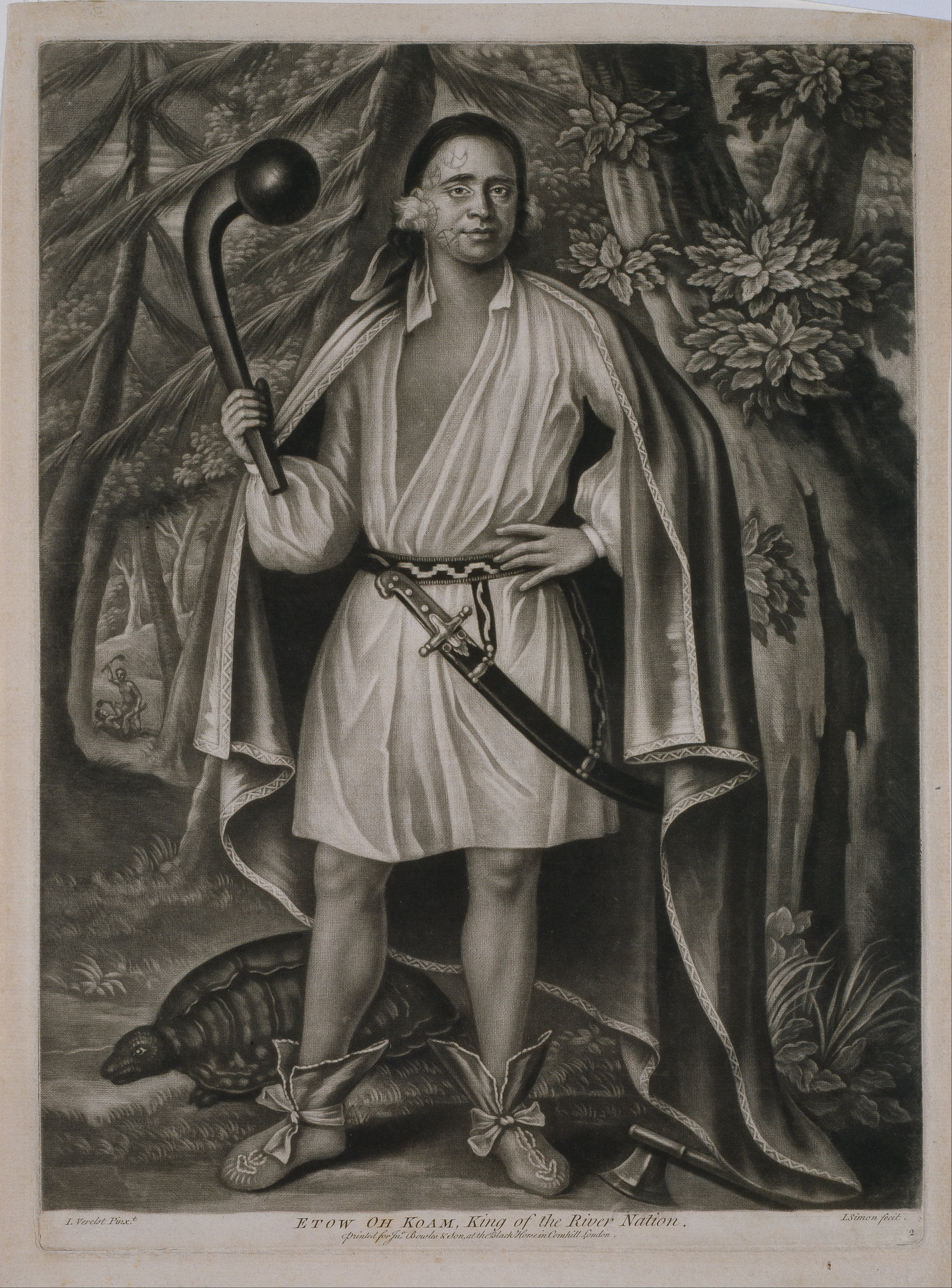
Etow Oh Koam, King of the River Nation, plate from the Four Mohawk Kings set, after John Verelst; National Portrait Gallery, London

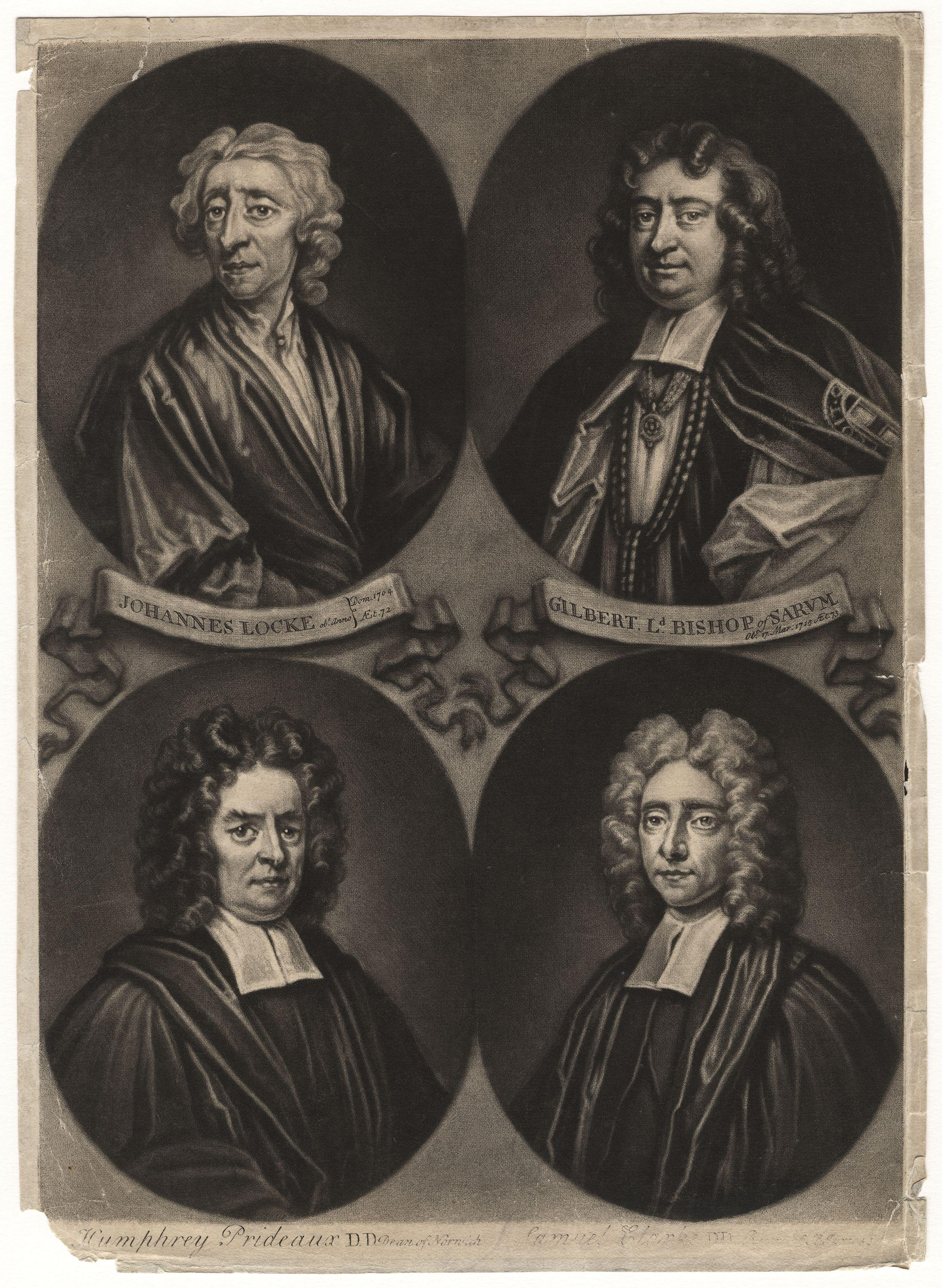
Gilbert Burnet, John Locke, Humphrey Prideaux, and Samuel Clarke, plate from the Poets and Philosophers of England set; National Portrait Gallery, London

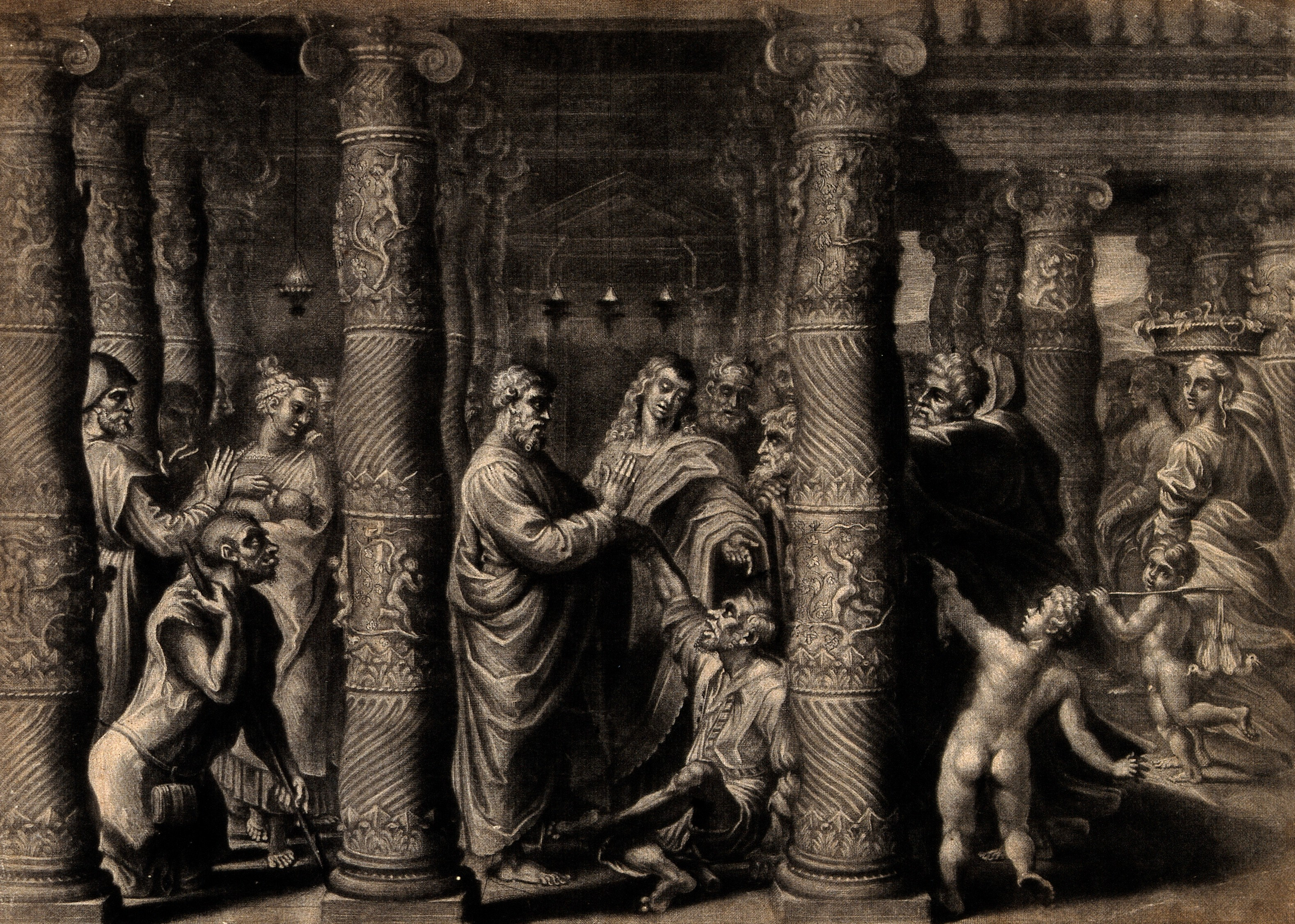
The Apostles Peter and John Heal the Lame Man, after a Raphael cartoon; Wellcome Collection, London

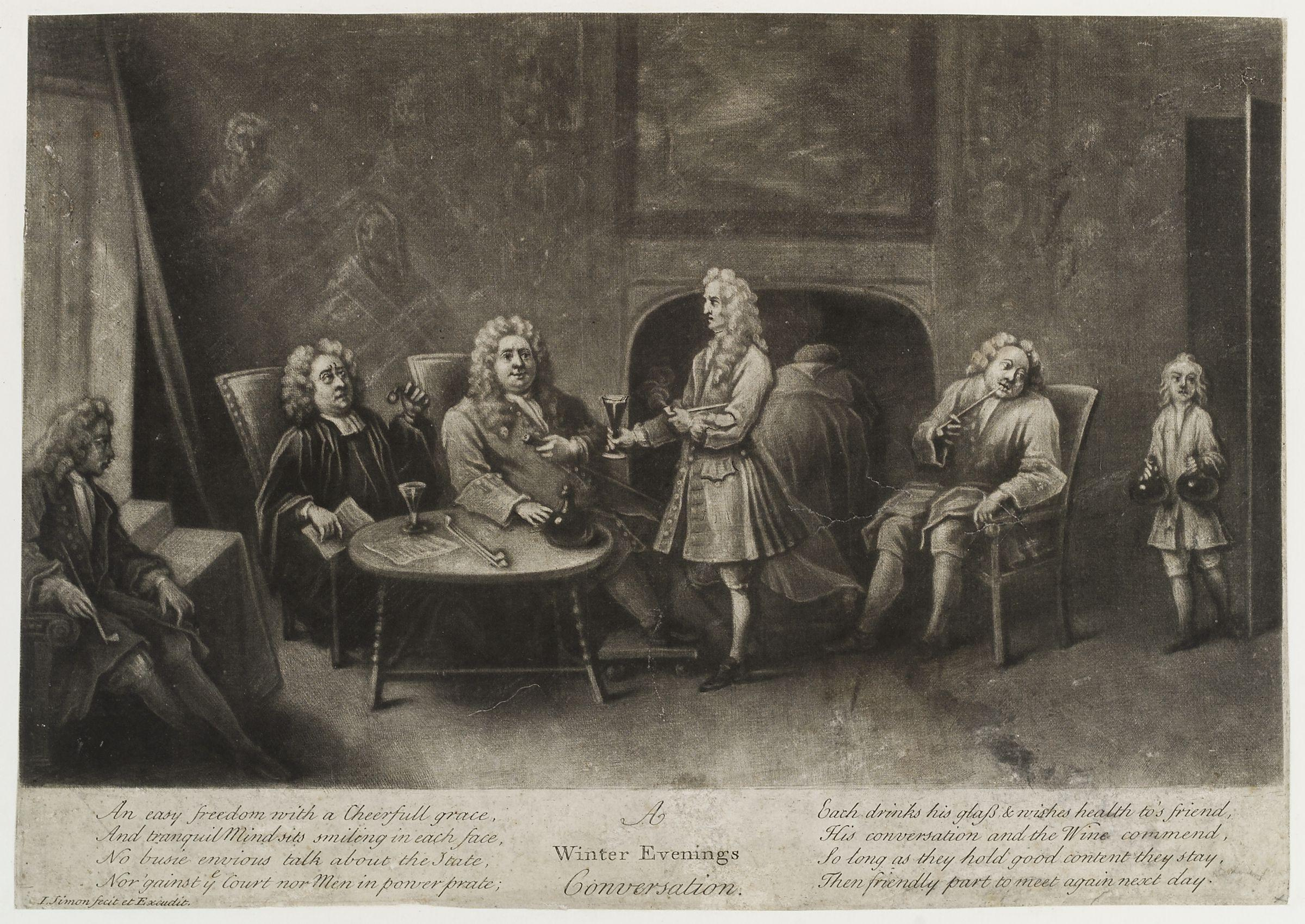
A Winter Evening's Conversation; National Portrait Gallery, London

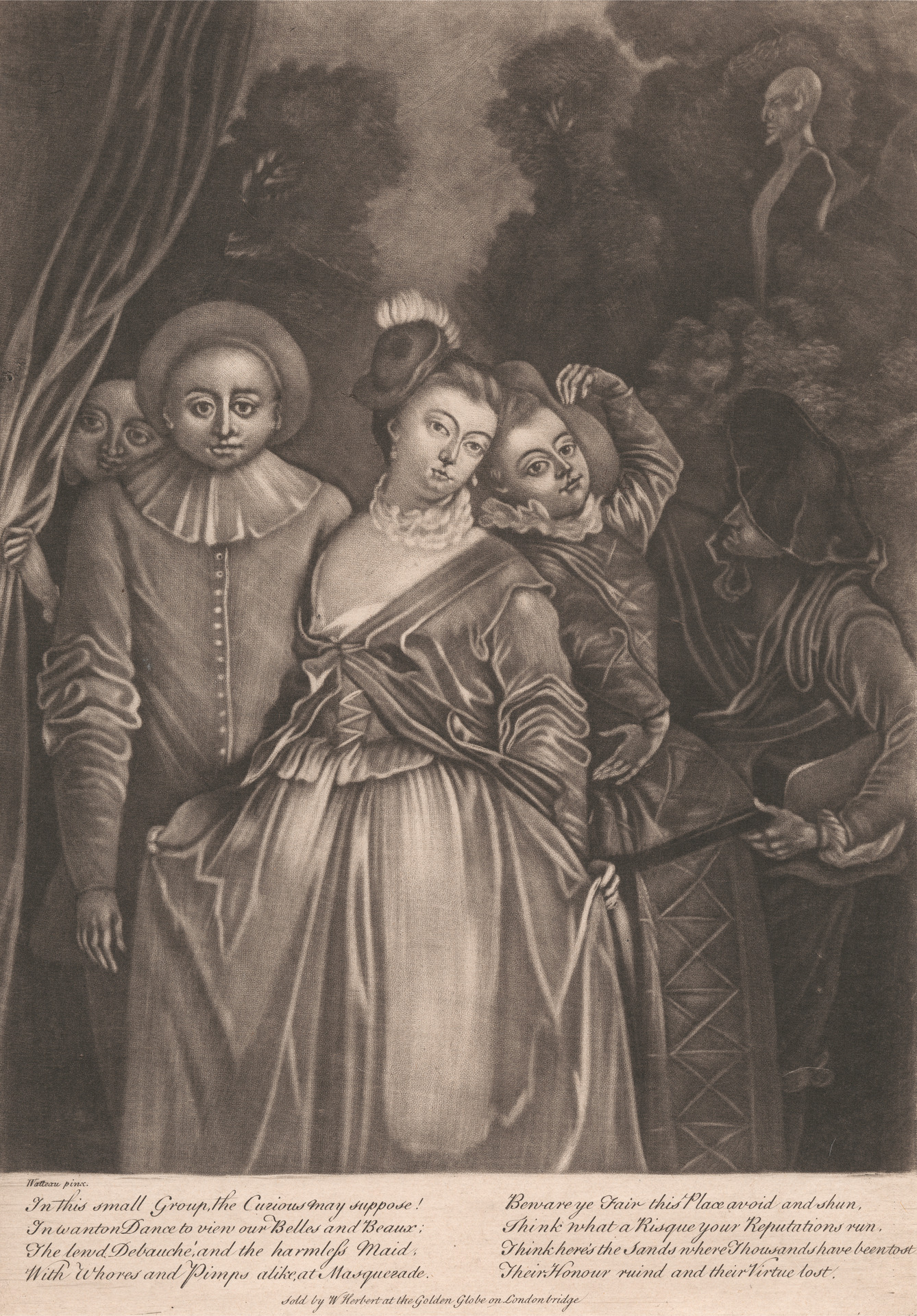
Masquerade, after Antoine Watteau; Yale Center for British Art, New Haven, Connecticut

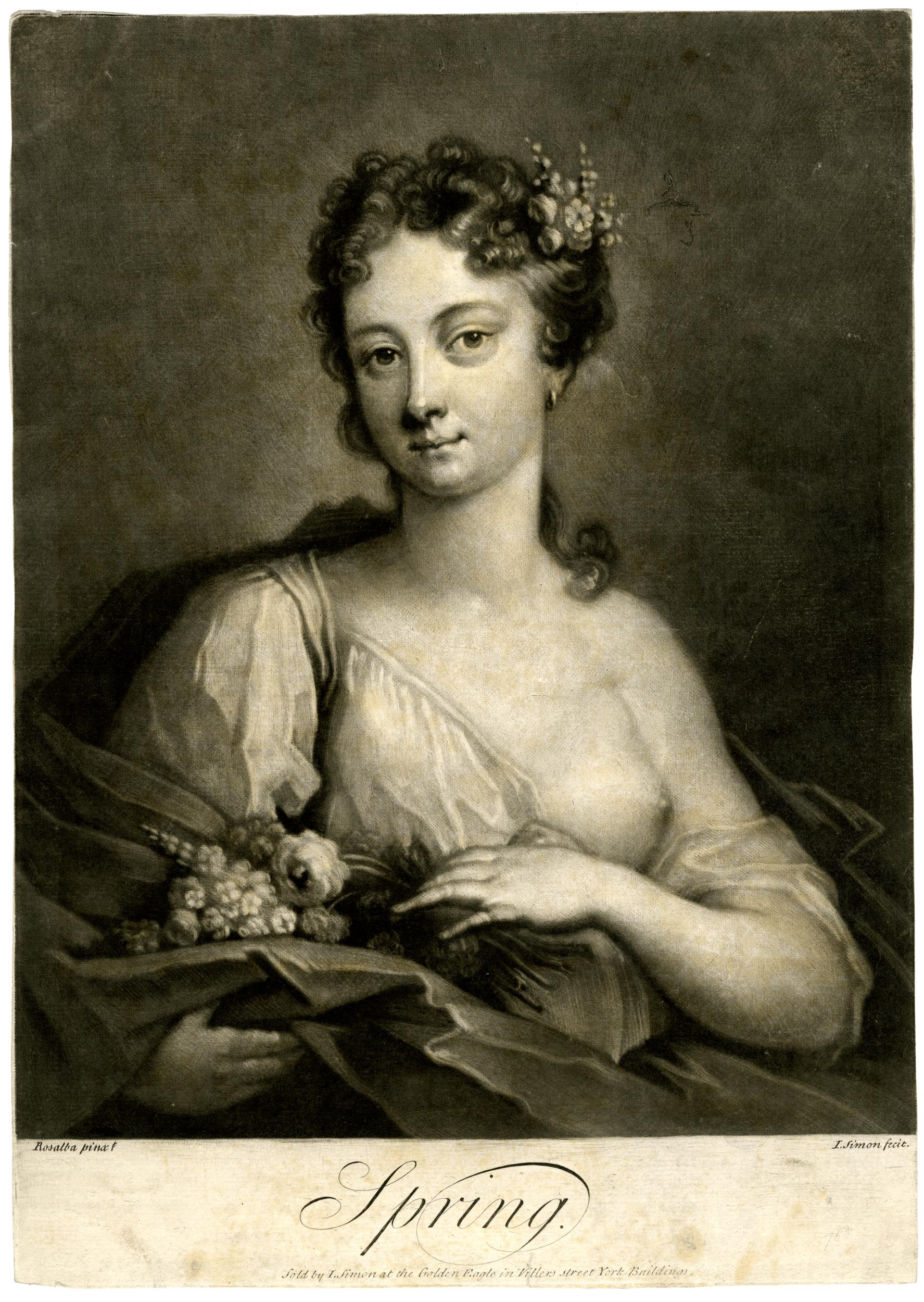
Spring, from the Seasons series, after Rosalba Carriera; British Museum, London

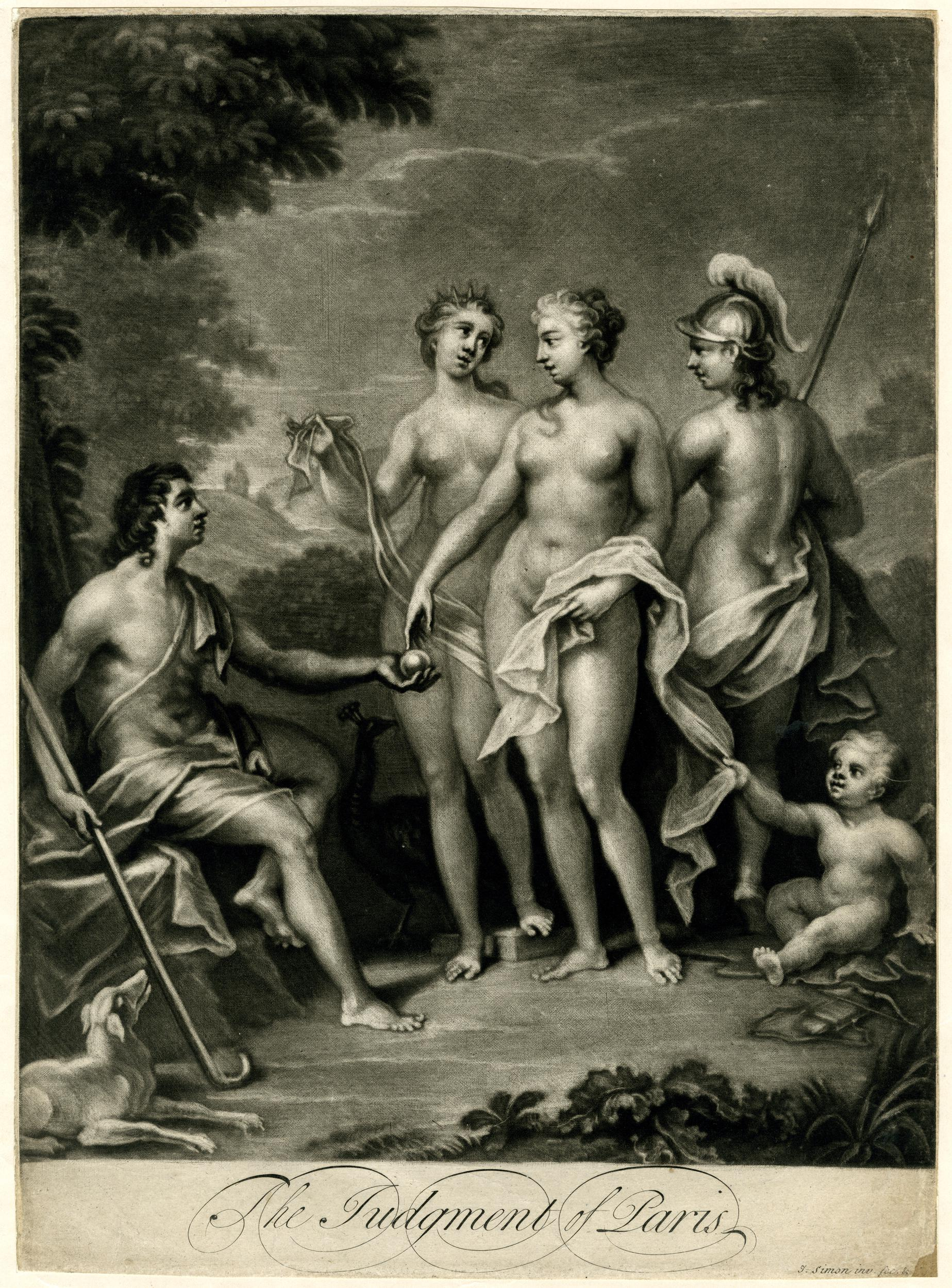
The Judgement of Paris; British Museum, London

== Sources ==
- Alexander, David (2022). A Biographical Dictionary of British and Irish Engravers, 1714–1820. London, New Haven: Paul Mellon Centre for Studies in British Art; distributed by Yale University Press. pp. 830–831. ISBN 978-1-913107-21-5. LCCN 2021935706. OCLC 1286378106.
- Aliverti, Maria Ines (Autumn 1997). "Major Portraits and Minor Series in Eighteenth-Century Theatrical Portraiture". Theatre Research International. 22 (3): 234–254. doi:10.1017/S030788330001703X. S2CID 162432346.
- Allison, Anne (December 1947). "Peter Pelham, Engraver in Mezzotinto". Antiques. 52: 441–443.
- Antal, Frederick (1962). Hogarth and His Place in European Art. New York: Basic Books. pp. 35, 151. OCLC 1035595582 – via the Internet Archive.
- Arms, John Taylor (1934). Handbook of Print Making and Print Makers. New York: Macmillan. p. 110. OCLC 609230931 – via Google Books.
- Atherton, Herbert M. (1974). Political Prints in the Age of Hogarth: A Study of the Ideographic Representation of Politics. Oxford: Clarendon Press. p. 44. ISBN 0-19-827188-3. OCLC 1034667797 – via the Internet Archive.
- Bellini, Paolo (1995). Dizionario della stampa d'arte (in Italian). Milan: Vallardi. p. 505. ISBN 88-11-91710-7. OCLC 247014252.
- Bénézit, Emmanuel (2006) [first published in French in 1911–1923]. Benezit Dictionary of Artists. Vol. 12. Paris: Gründ. p. 1234. ISBN 2-7000-3082-6 – via the Internet Archive.
- Bignamini, Ilaria (1988). "George Vertue, Art Historian and Art Institutions in London, 1689–1768: A Study of Clubs and Academies". The Walpole Society. 54: 1–148. JSTOR 41829562.
- Bryan, Michael (1905). Bryan's Dictionary of Painters and Engravers. Vol. 5. New York: Macmillan. pp. 83–84. OCLC 1041637252 – via the Internet Archive.
- Burke, Joseph (1976). English Art, 1714–1800. Oxford History of English Art. Vol. 9. Oxford: Clarendon Press. p. 178. ISBN 0-19-817209-5. OCLC 1150946106 – via the Internet Archive.
- Clayton, Muriel (1930). The Print Collector. New York: Dodd, Mead, and Co. p. 124. OCLC 1151061238 – via the Internet Archive.
- Clayton, Timothy (1997). The English Print, 1688–1802. London, New Haven: Yale University Press. ISBN 0-300-06650-3. OCLC 807564945.
- Dacier, Émile [in French]; Vuaflart, Albert (1922). Jean de Julienne et les graveurs de Watteau au XVIII-e siècle. III. Catalogue (in French). Paris: M. Rousseau. pp. 23, 134. doi:10.11588/DIGLIT.41977. OCLC 1039156495.
- Davenport, Cyril (1904). Mezzotints. London: Methuen and Co. pp. 104, 112–113, 115. OCLC 1049687052 – via the Internet Archive.
- Demkin, A. D. (2009). "Малоизвестные портреты А. Д. Меншикова и членов его семьи" (PDF). История Петербурга (in Russian). No. 51. pp. 33–44. Archived from the original on 23 November 2018.
- Dukelskaya, L. A. (1987). Английское меццо-тинто конца XVII—XVIII века из собрания Эрмитажа (exhibition catalogue) (in Russian). Leningrad: Iskusstvo. p. 36. OCLC 702704438.
- Godfrey, Richard T. (1978). Printmaking in Britain: A General History from Its Beginnings to the Present Day. New York: New York University Press. p. 29. ISBN 0-8147-2973-8. OCLC 1151065422 – via the Internet Archive.
- Gohm, Douglas Charles (1978). Maps and Prints for Pleasure and Investment. London: Gifford. p. 38. ISBN 0-7071-0567-6. OCLC 1245546044 – via the Internet Archive.
- Griffiths, Anthony (1996). Prints and Printmaking: an Introduction to the History and Techniques. Berkeley, Los Angeles: University of California Press. p. 85. ISBN 0-520-20714-9. OCLC 1036831840 – via the Internet Archive.
- Herold, Jacques; Vuaflart, Albert (1929). Jean de Julienne et les graveurs de Watteau au XVIII-e siècle. I. Notices et documents biographiques (in French). Paris: M. Rousseau. pp. 91, 260–262. doi:10.11588/DIGLIT.41975. OCLC 1039157338.
- Hind, Arthur M. (1963). A History of Engraving & Etching from the 15th Century to the Year 1914 (3rd, fully rev. ed.). New York: Dover. pp. 271, 373, 381. OCLC 1035610203 – via the Internet Archive.
- Hsieh, Chia-Chuan (December 2009). "Publishing the Raphael Cartoons and the Rise of Art-Historical Consciousness in England, 1707–1764". The Historical Journal. 52 (4): 899–920. doi:10.1017/S0018246X09990355. JSTOR 25643863. S2CID 159650136.
- Joubert, Caroline (2002). Ars nigra: la gravure en manière noire aux XVIIe et XVIIIe siècles (exhibition catalogue) (in French). Paris, Caen: Somogy, Musée des Beaux-Arts. p. 68. ISBN 2-85056-596-2. OCLC 1119482569.
- Kalyazina, N. V. (1977). "Материалы к иконографии А. Д. Меншикова" [Alexander Menshikov's Lifetime Portraits]. In Komelova, G. N. (ed.). Культура и искусство Петровского времени (collected papers) (in Russian). Leningrad: Avrora. pp. 70–87. OCLC 490999180.
- Killanin, Michael Morris, Baron (1948). Sir Godfrey Kneller and His Times, 1646-1723. London: Batsford. pp. 59, 60, 104, 105, 109; ill. 26, 65, 69. OCLC 1263366 – via the Internet Archive.
- Le Blanc, Charles (1854–1890). Manuel de l'amateur d'estampes (in French). Vol. 3. Paris: E. Bouillon. pp. 517–521. OCLC 793563927 – via the Internet Archive.
- Mackenzie, Ian (1987). British Prints: Dictionary and Price Guide. Woodbridge, Suffolk: Antique Collectors' Club. p. 291. ISBN 0-902028-96-0. OCLC 1244508760.
- Myers, Bernard S., ed. (1969). "Simon, John (Jean)". McGraw-Hill Dictionary of Art. Vol. 5. New York: McGraw-Hill. p. 182. OCLC 1150312272 – via the Internet Archive.
- Muller, Kevin R. (Fall 2008). "From Palace to Longhouse: Portraits of the Four Indian Kings in a Transatlantic Context". American Art. 22 (3): 26–49. doi:10.1086/595806. JSTOR 10.1086/595806. S2CID 159984142.
- O'Donoghue, Freeman Marius (1897). "Simon, John (1675?-1751)" . In Lee, Sidney (ed.). Dictionary of National Biography. Vol. 52. London: Smith, Elder & Co. p. 265.
- Oliver, Andrew (1973). "Peter Pelham (c. 1697–1751), Sometimes Printmaker in Boston". In Colonial Society of Massachusetts, Boston (ed.). Boston Prints and Printmakers, 1670–1775 (conference papers). Publications of the Colonial Society of Massachusetts. Vol. 46. Boston, Charlottesville: Colonial Society of Massachusetts, University Press of Virginia. pp. 133–173. OCLC 1028858792 – via the Internet Archive.
- Portalis, Roger; Béraldi, Henri (1882). "Les Simon". Les graveurs du dix-huitième siècle [Engravers of the Eighteenth Century] (in French). Vol. 3 (pt. 2). Paris: D. Morgand et C. Fatout. p. 548. OCLC 1050245691 – via the Internet Archive.
- Redgrave, Samuel (1878). A Dictionary of Artists of the English School (2nd ed.). London: George Bell. p. 395. OCLC 1043009709 – via the Internet Archive.
- Roland Michel, Marianne (1986). "Watteau and England". In Hind, Charles (ed.). The Rococo in England. London: Victoria and Albert Museum. pp. 46–59. ISBN 0-948107-37-5. OCLC 18588917.
- Rovinsky, Dmitry A. (1887). Подробный словарь русских гравированных портретов (in Russian). Vol. 2. Saint Petersburg: Imperial Academy of Sciences.
- Salaman, Malcolm C. (1906). The Old Engravers of England in Their Relation to Contemporary Life and Art (1540-1800). London et al.: Cassell and Co. pp. 81–87, 97, 177. OCLC 1049965266 – via the Internet Archive.
- Salaman, Malcolm C. (1910). Holme, Charles (ed.). Old English Mezzotints. London et al.: The Studio. pp. 14–15. OCLC 1049974212 – via the Internet Archive.
- Saunders, Richard H. (1995). John Smibert: Colonial America's First Portrait Painter. New Haven, London: Yale University Press. p. 45. ISBN 0-300-04258-2. OCLC 31607421.
- Sharp, Richard (2004). "Simon, John". In Matthew, H. C. G. & Harrison, Brian (eds.). Oxford Dictionary of National Biography. Vol. 50. Oxford, New York: Oxford University Press. pp. 659–660. ISBN 0-19-861400-4. LCCN 2004005444. OCLC 1035757202 – via the Internet Archive.
- Smith, John Chaloner (1878–1884). British Mezzotinto Portraits. London: H. Sotheran. pt. 3, pp. 1060–1130; pt. 4, div. 2, p. 1861–1863. OCLC 679810041 – via the Internet Archive.
- Strutt, Joseph (1785–1786). "John Simon". A Biographical Dictionary Containing All the Engravers, From the Earliest Period of the Art of Engraving to the Present Day. Vol. 2. London: Robert Faulder. p. 321. OCLC 1045222436 – via the Internet Archive.
- Vertue, George (1765). Walpole, Horace (ed.). A Catalogue of Engravers. Strawberry Hill: Thomas Kirgate. p. 133. OCLC 1039533429 – via the Internet Archive.
- Vertue, George (1932). "The Note-Books of George Vertue Relating to Artists and Collections in England (II)". The Walpole Society. 20. whole issue. JSTOR i40086519.
- Vertue, George (1934). "The Note-Books of George Vertue Relating to Artists and Collections in England (III)". The Walpole Society. 22. whole issue. JSTOR i40086509.
- Vertue, George (1952). "The Note-Books of George Vertue Relating to Artists and Collections in England (VI)". The Walpole Society. 30. whole issue. JSTOR i40086545.
- Vollmer, Hans, ed. (1937). "Simon (bei Walpole: Simons), Jean (John)". Allgemeines Lexikon der bildenden Künstler (in German). Vol. 31. Leipzig: E. A. Seemann. p. 56. OCLC 162257197.
- Walpole, Horace (1826). Anecdotes Of Painting In England. Vol. 5. London: Shakspeare Press. pp. 179, 183, 260. OCLC 1039493204 – via the Internet Archive.
- Walpole, Horace (1849). Anecdotes of Painting in England. Vol. 3. London: H. G. Bohn. pp. 934, 936, 978 – via the Internet Archive.
- Walpole, Horace (1879). Anecdotes Of Painting In England. London: Ward, Lock, and Co. p. 463. OCLC 1039484687 – via the Internet Archive.
- Wax, Carol (1990). The Mezzotint: History and Technique. New York: H. N. Abrams. pp. 28, 32, 76, 91. ISBN 0-8109-3603-8 – via Google Books.
- Whinney, Margaret; Millar, Oliver (1957). English Art, 1625–1714. Oxford History of English Art. Vol. 8. Oxford: Clarendon Press. p. 12. OCLC 1150992276 – via the Internet Archive.
- Whitman, Alfred (1898). The Masters of Mezzotint: The Men and Their Work. London: G. Bell and Sons. pp. 22, 23, 25. OCLC 741495781 – via Google Books.
- Wilder, F. L. (1969). How to Identify Prints. London: G. Bell and Sons. pp. 124, 128. ISBN 9780713515343. OCLC 1244861362 – via the Internet Archive.
