= Edward Tyson =

English scientist and physician (1651–1708)

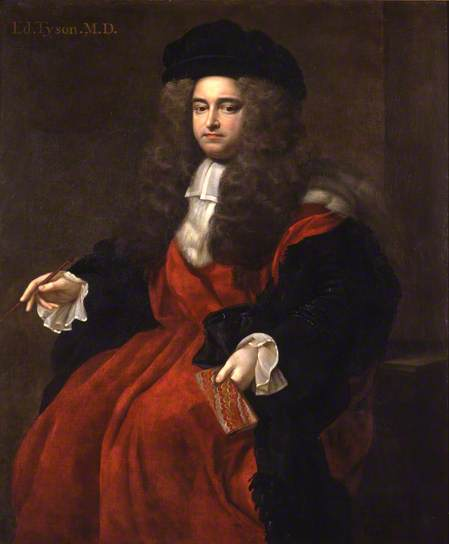
c. 1695 portrait of Tyson by Edmund Lilly

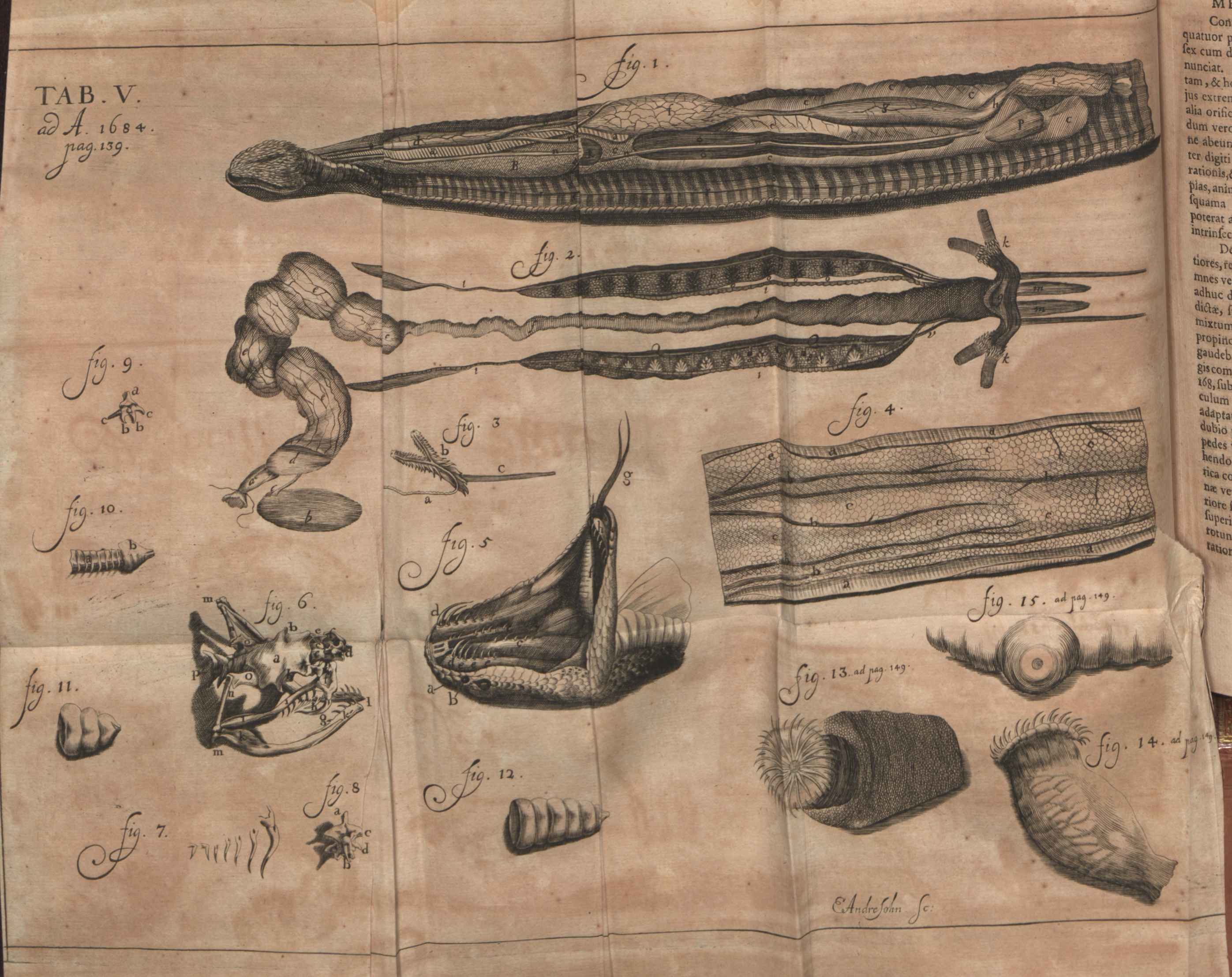
Illustration from Viperae Caudisonae anatomia, descripta ab Eduardo Tyson published in Acta Eruditorum, 1684

Edward Tyson (20 January 1651 – 1 August 1708) was an English scientist and physician. He is commonly regarded as the founder of modern comparative anatomy, which compares the anatomy between species.

== Biography ==
Tyson was born the son of Edward Tyson at Clevedon, in Somerset. He became a BA from Oxford on 8 February 1670, an MA from Oxford on 4 November 1673, and an MD from Cambridge in 1678. He was admitted to the College of Physicians on 30 September 1680 and as a Fellow in April 1683. In 1684 he was appointed physician and governor to the Bethlem Hospital in London (the first mental hospital in Britain and the second in Europe). He is credited with changing the hospital from a zoo of sorts to a place intended to assist its inmates. He was elected a Fellow of the Royal Society in November 1679. He is buried at St Dionis Backchurch.

== Anatomical research ==
In 1680, Tyson studied a porpoise and established that it is a mammal. He noted that the convoluted structures of the brains were closer to those of land quadrupeds than those of fish. In 1698, he dissected a chimpanzee on display at the London docks, and as a result wrote a book, Orang-Outang, sive Homo Sylvestris: or, the Anatomy of a Pygmie Compared with that of a Monkey, an Ape, and a Man. In the book he came to the conclusion that the chimpanzee has more in common with man than with monkeys, particularly with respect to its brain. This work was republished in 1894 with an introduction by Bertram C. A. Windle and a short biography of Tyson.

Tyson dissected a timber rattlesnake in 1683 and produced one of the earliest and most accurate descriptions of the internal anatomy of snakes. He was the first to describe the loreal pits of the Crotalinae. Tyson however did not recognize its heat-sensing function, thinking it was a hearing organ.

== See also ==
- Tyson's gland
