= Orang-Outang, sive Homo Sylvestris =

1699 book by Edward Tyson

Orang-Outang, sive Homo Sylvestris: or, the Anatomy of a Pygmie Compared with that of a Monkey, an Ape, and a Man (1699) is a book by the British natural philosopher Edward Tyson. Regarded as a seminal work on anatomy, this volume led to Tyson being known as the father of comparative anatomy. The book characterizes in detail the anatomy of a creature described as a pygmy (later known as a chimpanzee) and contains Tyson's views on the phylogeny of the pygmy and its relationship to humans, apes, and monkeys.

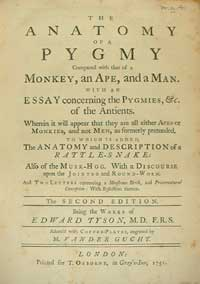
Title page of Anatomy of a Pygmy

The use of the phrase "orang-outang" does not refer to members of the orangutan genus Pongo, but rather uses the phrase to refer to the habitat of the subject; that is, a "person of the forest" (orangutan translates from Malay as "person of the forest/jungle".) Due to the absence of previous literature concerning chimpanzees, it is not clear whether or not the titular subject was a bonobo, Pan paniscus, or a common chimpanzee, Pan troglodytes, as there was no prior distinction between the two. Following his summary of the anatomy of the subject, Tyson attaches four essays concerning the ancients' knowledge of pygmies and entirely mythological cynocephali, satyrs, and sphinxes.

The book was originally published in 1699 and was republished in 1894 with an introduction that contains a biography of Edward Tyson by Bertram C. A. Windle. Large portions of the book are block quotations in Latin of works from antiquity regarding the anatomy and socialization of the pygmy, much of which Tyson regarded as inaccurate myths and hearsay.

== Letter of dedication ==
The letter of dedication is addressed to John Sommers, a Lord High Chancellor of England and President of the Royal Society. The letter thanks him for his dedication to the advancement of knowledge, specifically "experimental natural philosophy".

== Preface ==
The preface consists of Tyson giving his reasons for conducting the study, "to find out the truth, than to enlarge in the mythology; to inform the judgement, than to please the fancy". He also laments his inability to compare his findings directly to apes and monkeys, instead having to rely on the works of others, such as Aristotle, Pliny, Galen, and Vesalius. Lastly he apologizes in advance for any mistakes on his part within the book.

== Organization ==
The book itself is roughly divided into three parts containing Tyson's findings from his dissection of the pygmy and his comparison to previous findings, many of which are in Latin or Greek.

=== Overview ===
Tyson summarizes his observations on the external and internal anatomy of the pygmy, making note of their similarity or differences to humans. Most often he finds that the pygmy is different and "inferior" to humans, which is typical of the anthropocentrism of the time. Much of the text where he addresses previous findings is in Latin or Greek, although he does give explanations for why these authors' drew the conclusions they did, and why they are different or similar from his, in English.

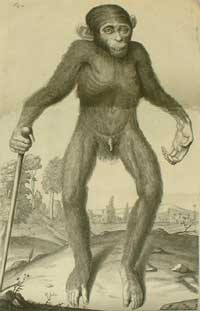
Drawing of a live, male pygmy

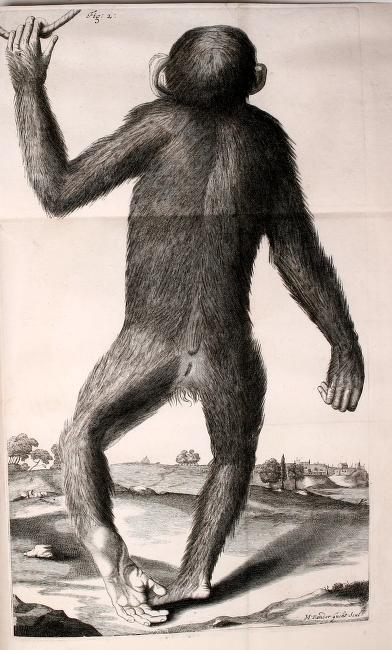
Drawing of a live, male pygmy

=== Skeleton ===
This section is further subdivided into five sections, with much of the text being in Latin or Greek.

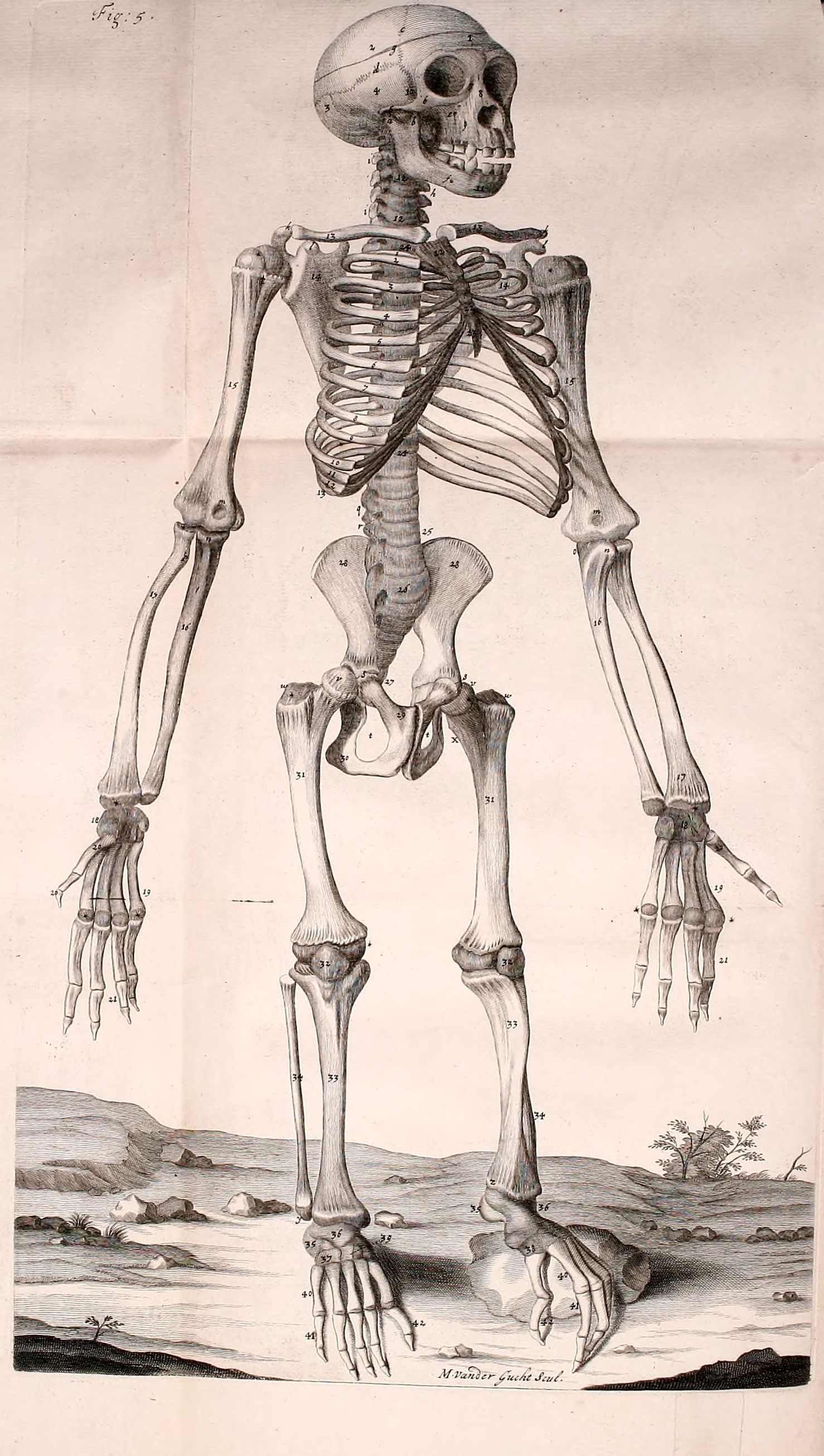
Image from Edward Tyson's Anatomy of a Pygmy

=== Muscles ===
This section is not divided, but addresses the musculature of the pygmy from head to feet.

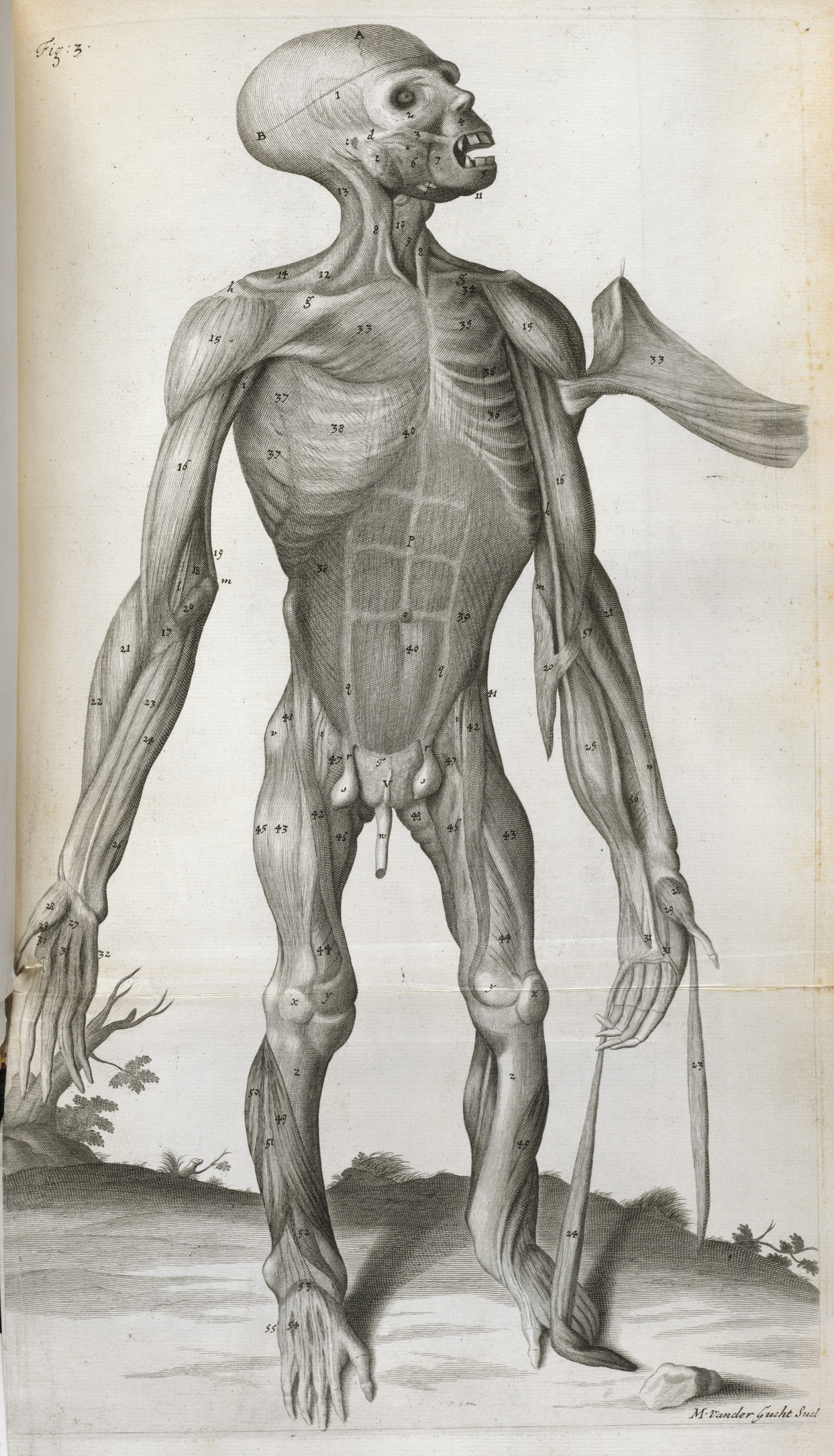
Image from Anatomy of a Pygmy

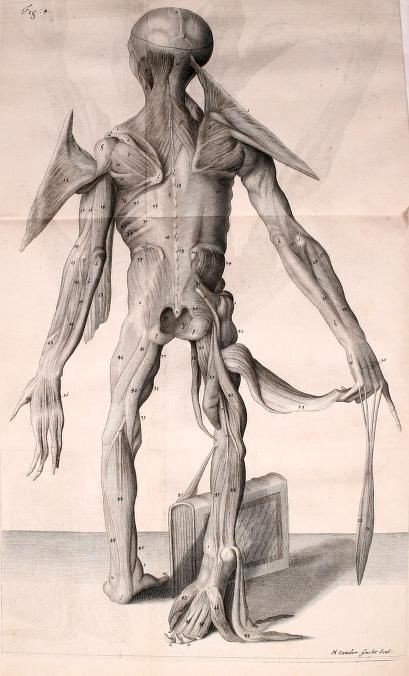
Image from Anatomy of a Pygmy

=== Synopsis ===
Here Tyson gives the reader two lists, the first how the pygmy is more like a man than an ape, and the second how the pygmy is more like an ape than a man.

==== Similarities ====
A list of features Tyson found present in the pygmy which are more similar to a human than to an ape or a monkey; the terms use modern, common, anatomical terms which may differ from what is found in the book, but have been changed to ease the readers' understanding.

1. Similar hair morphology of the shoulder and arm.
2. Similar facial structure: forehead larger than the chin.
3. The shape of the outer ear, except that the cartilage is thinner and more like an ape.
4. Thicker fingers than an ape has.
5. Primarily bipedal.
6. Larger buttocks than an ape.
7. Calf muscles.
8. Wider in the shoulders and pectorals.
9. Longer heel.
10. Adipose membrane next to the skin.
11. Unperforated peritoneum in the groin.
12. Longer small intestine.
13. Larger intestinal canal.
14. Presence of a vermiform appendix; beginning of the colon is not extended.
15. Insertion of the bile and pancreatic ducts are in the same location. The ape also has this same location, but not a monkey.
16. Longer large intestine.
17. The liver is not divided into lobes (which humans do have; this differs from modern anatomical understanding).
18. Similar bile vessels.
19. Same spleen.
20. Same pancreas.
21. Same number of lobes in each lung.
22. Pericardium attached to diaphragm.
23. More rounded apex of the heart.
24. No pouches in the chaps (unclear).
25. Much larger brain than in apes, with the same structures as a human brain.
26. More globular skull; twice as big as an ape's or monkey's.
27. Same number of cranial sutures. Wormian (intra-sutural) bones also present (though not present in all humans).
28. Cribriform plate and crista galli are present (present also in apes but not monkeys).
29. Sella turcica is less prominent than in apes and monkeys.
30. Pterygoid process present.
31. Temporal and anterior fontanelle are different in monkeys (but not in apes).
32. Zygomatic bone more similar to humans (smaller than in monkeys and apes).
33. Shape of the teeth, especially the canines and molars.
34. Transverse apophysis of C6 and C7 vertebra are more like a human's.
35. Cervical vertebra lack foramen for containing the nerves (not the spinal cord, but rather peripheral nerves which travel to the rest of the body) which are present in monkeys.
36. Number of thoracic and lumbar apophyses.
37. Five vertebrae in the loins (could refer to lumbar vertebrae, of which monkey and apes have six).
38. Lumbar vertebrae are straight.
39. Five sacral elements; three in apes and monkeys.
40. Four unperforated segments of the coccyx; monkeys have more.
41. Seven true ribs which articulate in the body of the vertebrae; in apes and monkeys there are eight which articulate in the interstices of the vertebrae.
42. Broad sternum; narrow in monkeys.
43. Larger phalanges than in apes.
44. Femur articulates and is shaped more like a human's.
45. Round, single patella, not long and double like in an ape.
46. Same heel, tarsals, and metatarsals as a human.
47. Middle toe is not the longest, as it is in apes and monkeys.
48. The obliquus capitis inferior, pyriformis, and biceps femoris are a human's. All other muscles are like the human's as well, but are not distinguishably different from an ape or monkey the same, either from lack of subject or previous observations.

==== Differences ====
A list of features Tyson found were more similar between the pygmy and the ape and monkey, and less similar to a human.

1. Stature.
2. Flat nose.
3. Cranial ridge beneath the eyebrow.
4. Hairier.
5. Smaller thumb, than a human or an ape, more like a monkey's.
6. Long, narrow palms.
7. Longer toes.
8. Great toes are opposable, like thumbs.
9. Shorter (less tall) at the shoulder and thigh.
10. Longer arms.
11. Scrotum not pendulous.
12. Larger omentum.
13. Long and slender gall bladder.
14. The kidneys rounder than in humans, and the ureters are different.
15. Longer urinary bladder
16. No preputium frenum.
17. Eye orbit protrudes inward, toward the brain.
18. Lack of cavities beneath the sella turcica.
19. The mastoid and styloid processes are very small, almost absent.
20. Flat bone of the nose.
21. Number of teeth.
22. Short, flat-front cervical vertebra without bifide spines.
23. No spine in the fifth cervical vertebra.
24. Number of thoracic vertebra: twelve in man, ten in apes, thirteen in a pygmy.
25. Same number of vertebra or elements in the sacrum as an ape.
26. Thirteen ribs on each side; humans have twelve.
27. Smaller thumb bones than humans have.
28. The ilium is exactly like an ape's, that is longer, narrower, and less concave than a man's.
29. Length of the bones of the toes; the great toe is opposable like an ape's.
30. Lack of occipitalis, frontalis, dilator naris, levator labii superioris, interspinales cervicis, gluteus minimus, extensor digitorum pedi brevis, and transversalis pedi.
31. Lack of pyramidales, palmaris longus, attollens auriculum, and retrains auriculum.
32. Levator claviculae are present (absent in humans).
33. Longus colli, pectoralis, latissimus dorsi, gluteus maximus, gluteus medius, psoas major, psoas minor, iliacus internus, and the gastrocnemius internalis are more similar to apes and monkeys than humans.
34. Deltoid, pronator radii trees, and extensors pollicis brevis are different from a human's.
