= Samuel Redgrave =

English writer

Samuel Redgrave (3 October 1802, London - 20 March 1876 London) was an English civil servant and writer on art.

== Life ==
He was the eldest son of William Redgrave, and brother of Richard Redgrave, and was born at 9 Upper Eaton Street, Pimlico, London. When he was about 14 years old he obtained a clerkship at the Home Office, and in his leisure he studied French, German, and Spanish, and practised watercolour painting and architectural drawing. He was admitted in 1833 as an architectural student of the Royal Academy.

He subsequently received a permanent appointment at the Home Office, and worked on the registration of criminal offences. In 1836 he acted as secretary to the constabulary force commission, and in May 1839 became assistant private secretary to Lord John Russell, and then to Fox Maule, until September 1841. Later, from December 1852 to February 1856, he was private secretary to Henry Fitzroy.

He retired from public service in 1860, and devoted the rest of his life to art. He had been secretary to the Etching Club since 1842, and knew leading artists. At the International Exhibition of 1862 the watercolour gallery was arranged by him, and the loan collection of miniatures exhibited at the South Kensington Museum in 1865 was under his management. His efforts contributed to the National Portrait exhibitions of 1866, 1867, and 1868, and the gallery of British art in the Paris International Exhibition of 1867 was under his direction. He also acted as secretary to the committee which carried out the exhibitions of the works of old masters and deceased British artists held at the Royal Academy from 1870, but then retired on the appointment of a lay secretary to the academy in 1873.

Redgrave died at 17 Hyde Park Gate South, London in 1876, and was buried in the churchyard of Holy Trinity, Brompton.

== Works ==
During the tenure of the Home Office by Sir George Grey he prepared under direction a volume entitled Some Account of the Powers, Authorities, and Duties of Her Majesty's Principal Secretary of State for the Home Department, which was printed for official use in 1852. This work led him to compile Murray's Official Handbook of Church and State, which was published in 1852 and again in 1855.

His first contribution to the literature of art was A Century of Painters of the British School, written with his brother Richard, and first published in 1866. This was followed in 1874 by his Dictionary of Artists of the English School, and in 1877 by a Descriptive Catalogue of the Historical Collection of Water-colour Paintings in the South Kensington Museum, on which he was engaged at the time of his death. He also compiled the Catalogue of the Loan Exhibition of Fans, 1870, which was followed by Fans of all Countries, a folio volume issued in 1871, and he assisted in the compilation of the Catalogue of the Paintings, Miniatures, &c., bequeathed to the South Kensington Museum by the Rev. Alexander Dyce (1874).
