= Jean Restout =

Jean Restout may refer to:

- Jean Restout the Elder (1666–1702), French painter
- Jean Restout the Younger (1692–1768), French painter
- Jean-Bernard Restout (1732–1797), French painter
