= Marc Restout =

French painter

Marc Restout (14 February 1616, in Caen, Province of Normandy – 3 April 1684, in Caen) was a French painter. The son of Marguerin Restout, he was a member of the Restout dynasty of painters. A prolific artist, he gained considerable reputation in Flanders, Holland and Rome, having accompanied Nicolas Poussin to Rome in 1642. At the time of his death he held the position of échevin (municipal magistrate) in Caen.

He had ten children, most of whom also became painters, including Jacques Restout, Eustache Restout, Jean Restout the Elder, Charles Restout, Thomas Restout, Pierre Restout, and Marc Antoine Restout.
