= Mondaye Abbey =

French Premonstratensian abbey in the Bessin countryside

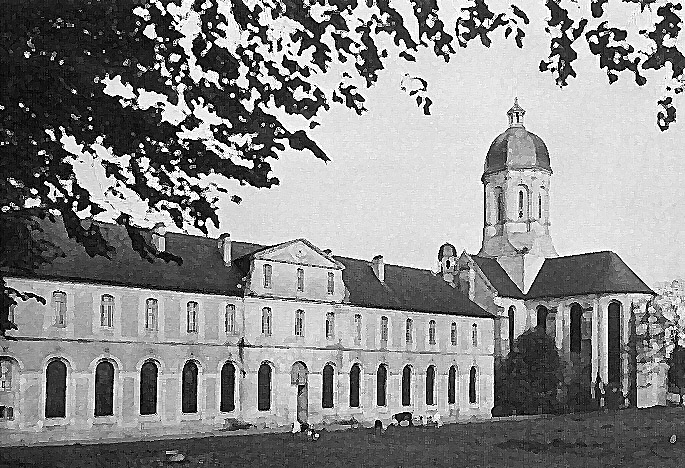
- Interactive map of Mondaye Abbey

Monastery information
- Order: Premonstratensian
- Established: 1200
- Dedication: Martin of Tours
- Diocese: Bayeux

People
- Founder: Turstin

Site
- Coordinates: 49.2065°N 0.6878°W

Mondaye Abbey (French: Abbaye de Mondaye or Abbaye Saint-Martin de Mondaye) is a French Premonstratensian abbey in the Bessin countryside at Juaye-Mondaye, Calvados, nine miles to the south of Bayeux. Founded in 1200, it is the only Premonstratensian house still active in Normandy, with two dependent priories at Conques and Tarbes.

== History ==
=== Medieval ===
In the mid-12th century, a priest named Turstin withdrew to a wooded Norman hill to live as a hermit, where he was quickly joined by a circle of followers. When Turstin died in 1200, the bishop of Bayeux established the community under the Rule of St. Augustine. Turstin's brother-in-law Raoul de Percy donated land for the abbey. In 1210, under the protection of La Lucerne Abbey, the order was incorporated into the order of Saint Norbert. Over the following years, the abbey continued to receive donation from the de Percy and de Vassy families, as well as from lesser nobility and well-to-do farmers. At the end of the 13th century, a church and monastic buildings were built to replace the hermitage. In 1343 the abbey's gifts were interrupted by the Hundred Years' War and rivalries between pro-French and pro-English lords in the area. In 1347 the Black Death killed a third of the population, the abbey's lands were uncultivated and the Bessin was ravaged by armed bands. The abbey itself was ravaged by Richard FitzAlan, 11th Earl of Arundel, in 1389.

=== 1500-1700 ===
Mondaye flourished again under the abbacy of Jean Feray (1512-1557). Its monks attended the university of Caen and included many doctors of theology among them. However, this high period was interrupted by the French Wars of Religion, with the abbey burned, its treasures dispersed and its abbot Julien Guichard killed by Huguenots on 5 September 1564. After the Council of Trent, calm returned and the monastery church was restored thanks to support from Anne de Médavy.

In 1631, Claude Leclerc du Tremblay was appointed commendentory abbot by the king and headed the abbey for the next 75 years. The Lorraine reform revising the Saint Norbert rule and making it stricter and closer to its origins was adopted by Mondaye abbey in 1655. Choosing a prior by the chapter of the congregation partly avoided the disadvantages of a commendatory abbot.

=== 1700-1815 ===
Three regular abbots were appointed by Louis XIV and Louis XV, and ruled the abbey from 1704 to 1763. Under these three figures' aegis a total reconstruction was begun as part of the momentum of the new classicist style, to meet the then-prevailing need for grandeur in France. The church, monastic buildings, entrance pavilion and farm (where 30 people worked) were all rebuilt, though with the order's austerity maintained by small cells and by only having chimneys in the prior's lodging, the warming house and the infirmary. It was supervised by the architect Eustache Restout (himself prior and sub-prior of Mondaye) from 1706 to 1743, with his last years devoted to decorating the church (including paintings by his nephew Jean II Restout). In 1763 the abbey again fell under a commendatory abbot and building work stopped.

On the French Revolution the Premonstratensian order was despoiled of its goods and the 17 monks at Mondaye were dispersed or imprisoned. One of them was father Paynel, curé de Juaye, who took the oath of the Civil Constitution of the Clergy before abandoning the priesthood to become mayor. Paynel did, however, reconcile with the church, saving the abbey church from destruction and taking nine priests opposed to the civil constitution into his house. Once the revolutionary turmoil was over, Father Goujon ceased to be clandestine prior and gathered together the parishes of Juaye, Couvert and Bernières-le-bocage - the commune of Juaye-Mondaye originated in this era. From 1806 to 1812 the monastic buildings housed a collège.

=== 1815-1940 ===
In 1815 the Trappists of Valenton took over the buildings at Mondaye but left them in 1854 when their maintenance became too expensive for them to bear. The Premonstratensian order moved back into the buildings on 13 June 1859, when the bishop of Bayeux solemnly handed back the keys to it to canons coming from the Belgian abbey at Grimbergen. The community underwent a major phase of expansion and increased their number of parochial missions, preaching tours and retreats. It also restarted work on building north and south wings in the classical style.

A new crisis arose when the authorities of the French Third Republic wished to reduce monks' influence in society. In 1880 abbot Joseph Willekens was expelled as a foreigner and the canons were dispersed. The canons then regrouped in the château de Cottun, not far from the abbey, returned to the abbey in 1894, only to be re-expelled in 1902. On the second expulsion they headed into exile at the Bois-Seigneur-Isaac in Walloon Brabant in Belgium. In 1921 the monks were authorised to return to their abbey and new novices presented themselves.

=== 1940 to present ===
In June 1944 the Allied landings subjected the abbey to many days of bombing and, despite being completely restored, the abbey walls are still marked by the fighting in its surroundings. Rebuilding works on the most badly damaged part of the church began in 2007. The church, monastic building, pressoir, pavilion, enclosure, grange, grange aux dîmes, cloister and interior decor are now listed together as a monument historique.

The general chapter of Wilten, in 1968-1970, enforced obedience to the order's constitutions and the Vatican II directives. From this era onwards exchanges of information and participation with the lay world expanded, as did the workshop and farm. The canons of Mondaye, like all canons regular, live communally but still deliver an external ministry, providing curés and vicars for many parishes as well as prison and hospital chaplains, many of whom pursue a profession in civil society. It also welcomes retreats and visitors - parts of the abbey can be viewed by the public for an entrance fee, with visitors guided by a canon. Its shop sells various items made at the abbey, including CDs of its music.

== Architecture ==
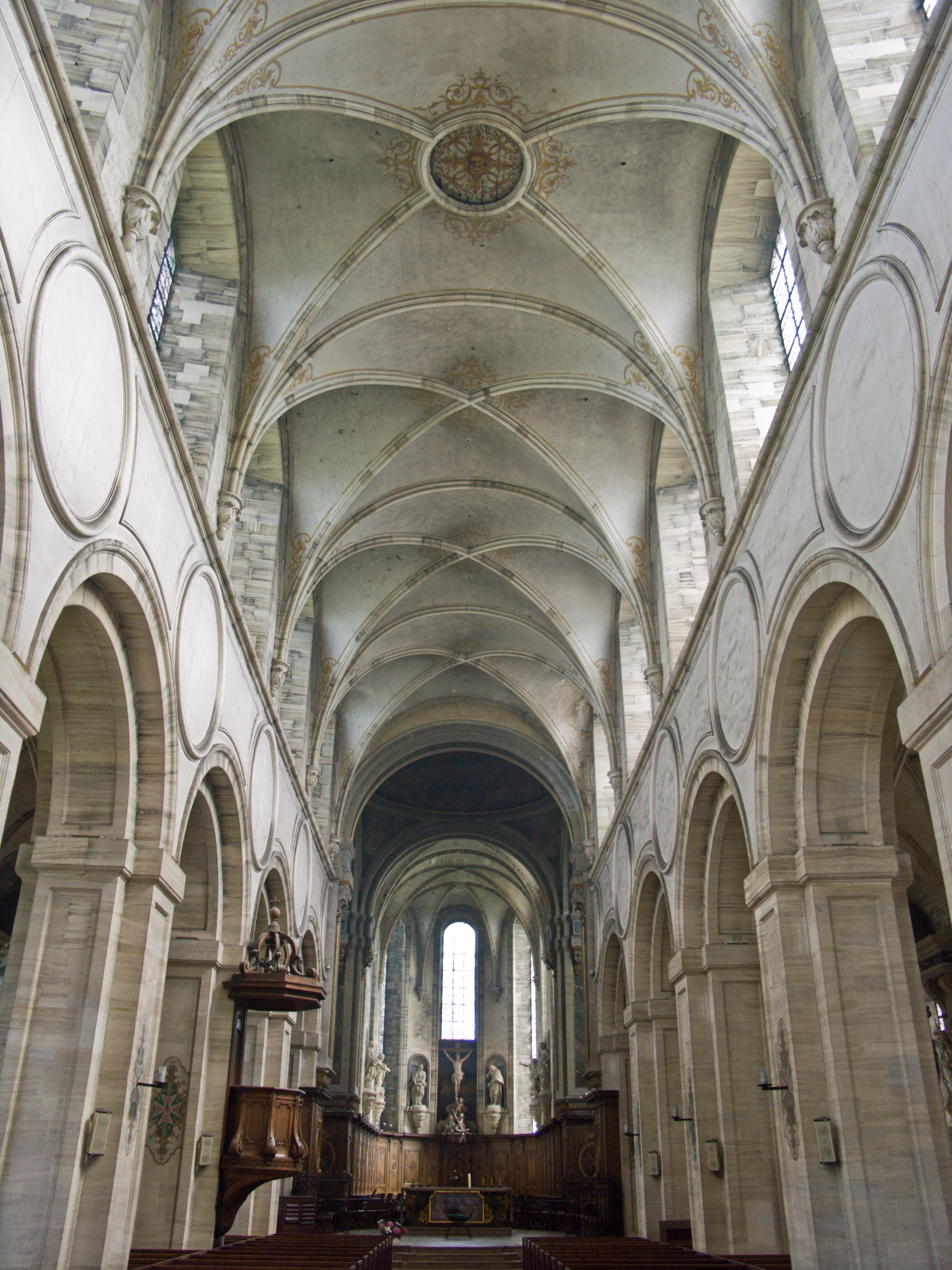
Nave of the church

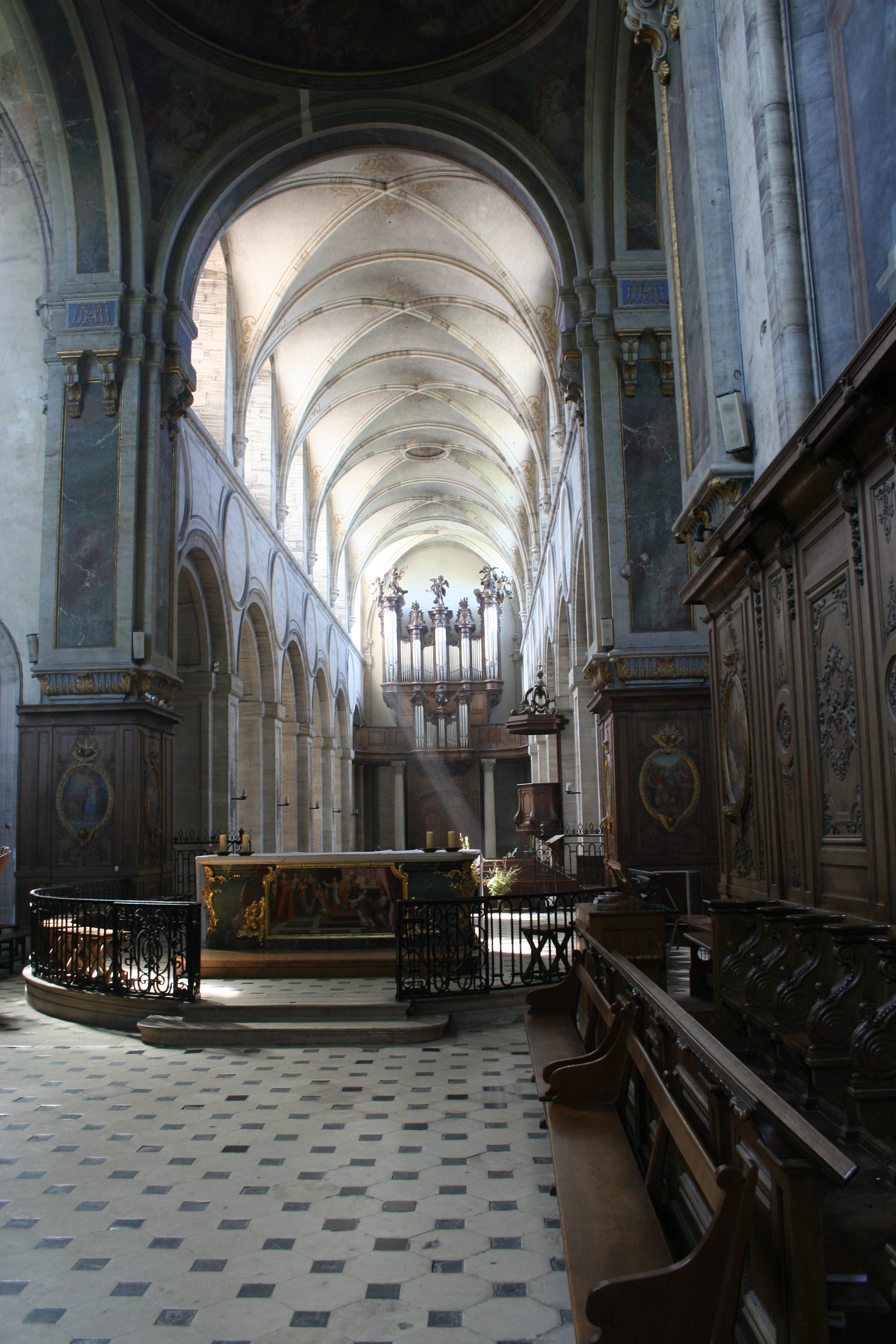
The nave

=== Church ===
The church is wholly as conceived by Eustache Restout, who also painted the paintings and designed the woodwork for the choir. 60m long, the building presents a blind portal, leaving space for the organ. The nave has 5 spans, with wide pillars supporting arches and with the south side illuminated by two openings on the north side. The altar is in the centre and the arms of the transept are large, as is Premonstratensian tradition. The dome above the altar is a copy of that of the now-vanished chapel of the château de Sceaux, painted by Charles Le Brun.

=== Organ ===
A fine example of Louis XV-era art, the organ was made by Claude Parisot from Lorraine. Its case was carved by the Flemish artist Melchior Verly. Completed in 1741, the instrument was restored in 1965 and in 2004 by the organmakers Jean-Baptiste Boisseau and Jean-Marie Gaborit. With 27 pipes, it is regularly used for concerts.

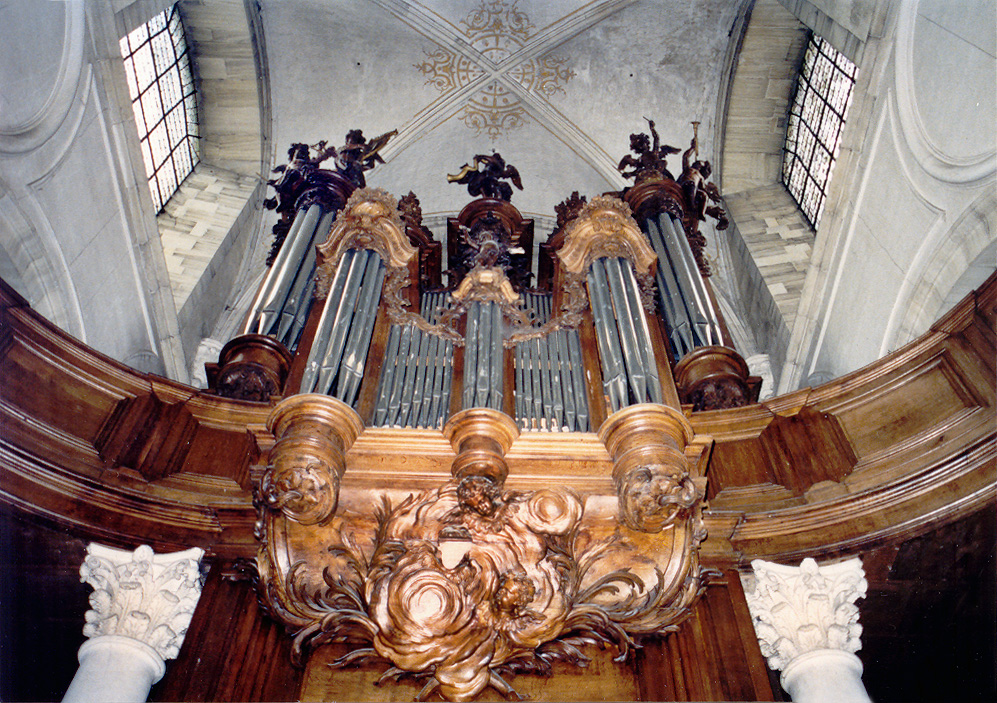
The organ in 1989

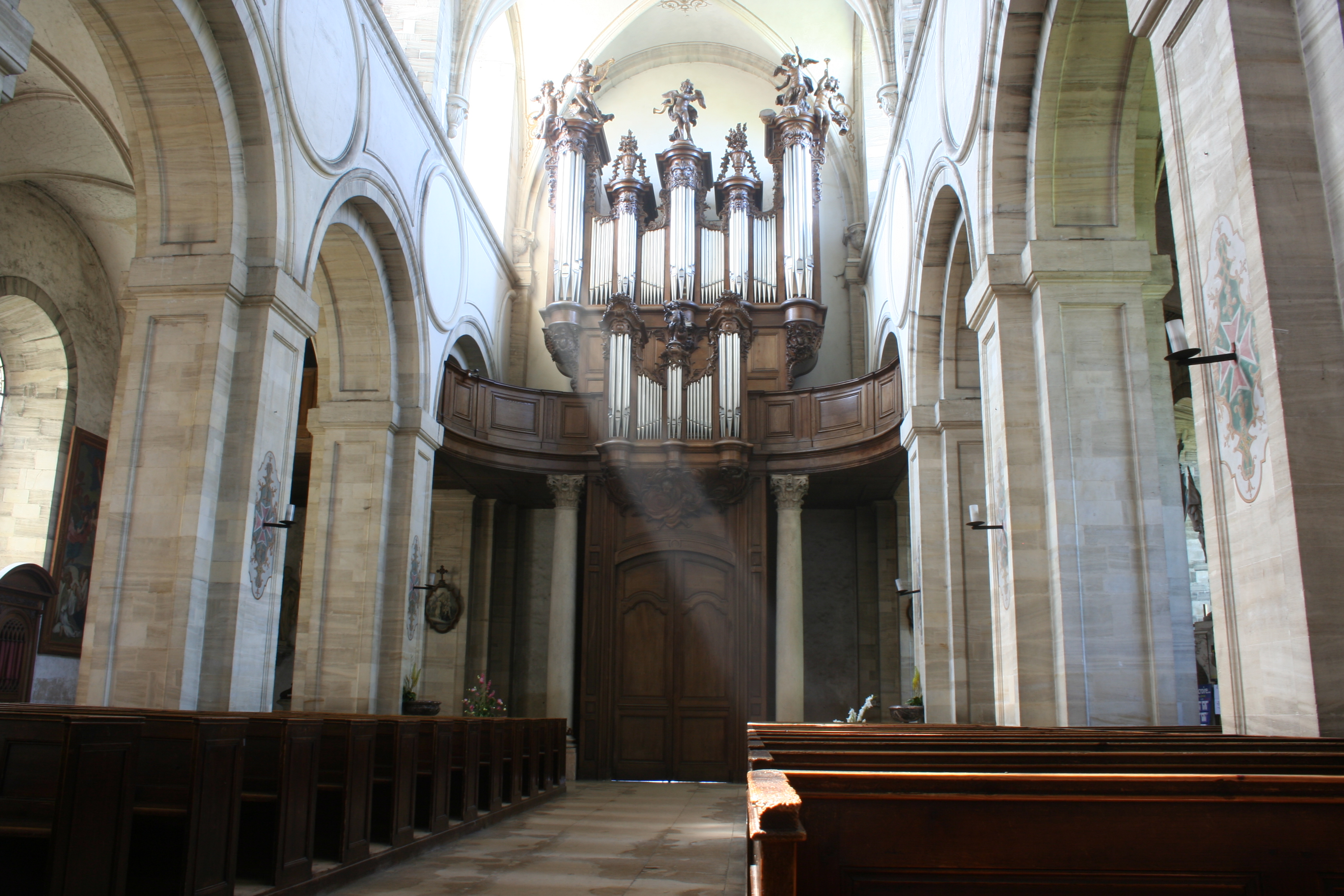
The organ

=== Monastic buildings ===
The cloister was begun in the 18th century with the east wing and part of the south wing, then continued, glazed but unfinished in the 19th century. It thus does not form the closed garden usual for cloisters. The staircase leading to the library and to the cells has wrought iron railings. The salle des pas-perdus has a self-portrait of Eustache Restout.

=== Library ===
It contains 40,000 volumes, of which some are 16th century.

== Abbots of Mondaye ==
13th century

- Roger I de Juaye (+ 1208)
- Richard (1210-1225)
- Roger II (1225-1242)
- Gabriel du Fay (1266-1276)
- Geoffroy I (+1280)

14th century

- Geoffroy II Blason (+1312)
- Geoffroy III de Champrepus (+1318)
- Raoul d'Orival (1327)
- Richard II Simon (1347-1349)
- Robert I Garay (1360-1372)
- Geoffroy IV Randouin (1389-1390)

15th century

- Robert II de Bacilly (1417-1418)
- Thomas I Arnould (1421)
- Jean I Louys (1421)
- Guillaume I (1452)
- Pierre (1452-1457)
- Guillaume II (1462)
- Thomas II (1465)
- Guillaume III le Bigot (1470)
- Jean II le Barberel (1482)
- Samson (1487)
- Laurent de Cussy (1487-1489)
- Jean III Pellecoq (1494)
- Nicolas de la Boysaine (1494-1497)

16th century

- Gilles I l'Ours (1497-1512)
- Jean IV féray (1512-1557)
- Gilles II de Valognes (1557-1562)
- Julien Guichard (after 1562)
- Guy Habel (1570)
- Jean V Bourdon (1572-1587)

17th century

- François du Bouilloney (1571-1631)
- Claude Leclerc du Tremblay, commend. (1631-1704)

18th century

- Philippe Lhermitte (1704-1725)
- Olivier Jahouel, coadj. (1719), abbot (1725-1738)
- Louis-Joseph Reusse (1738-1763)
- Charles Raffin, commend. (1763-1782)
- Charles II de la Rochefoucaul-Dubreuil, commend. (1782-1784)
- Jean VI de Champigny, commend. (1784-1790)

19th century

- Joseph I Willekens (1873-1908)

20th century

- Joseph II de Panthou (1908-1915)
- Exupère Auvray (1915-1942)
- Norbert Huchet (1942-1943)
- Yves Bossière (1947-1956)
- Paul Dupont (1956-1971)
- Gildas Sévère (1973-1989)
- Pascal Gaye (1989-1999)
- Joël Houque (2006-2013)
- François-Marie Humann (2013- )

== Priories dependent on Mondaye ==
- Priory of Sainte-Anne de Bonlieu, Bonlieu-sur-Roubion - Diocese of Valence
- Priory of Sainte-Foy de Conques - Diocese of Rodez
- Priory of Notre-Dame des Neiges, Laloubère - Diocese of Tarbes and Lourdes
- Priory of San-Norberto, Miasino - Diocese of Novara (Piedmont, Italy)

== Bibliography ==
- Godefroid Madelaine, Essai historique sur l'abbaye de Mondaye, Caen 1874.
- Jean Pelcoq L'abbaye de Mondaye, Juaye-Mondaye 1938
- M. Degroult, Mondaye en Normandie, Juaye-Mondaye 1959
- Tristan Jeanne-Valès, Mondaye, Photographies Noir et Blanc, ISBN 2-904141-00-6, Juaye-Mondaye 1982.
