= Restout =

The Restout family was a French dynasty of painters from Normandy, including the painters:

  - Marc Restout (1616–1684) and his sons:
    - Jacques Restout (1650–1701)
    - Eustache Restout (1655–1743), architect and engraver
    - Thomas Restout (1671–1754)
  - Jean Restout the Elder (1666–1702), and his sons:
    - Jean Restout the Younger (1692–1768)
      - Jean-Bernard Restout (1732–1797)
