= Thomas Restout =

French painter (1671–1754)

Thomas Restout (15 March 1671 – 2 May 1754, in Caen, Normandy) was a French painter. The son of Marc Restout, he belonged to the Restout dynasty of painters and was mainly a portraitist.
