= Claude Parisot =

French organ builder (c. 1704 – 1784)

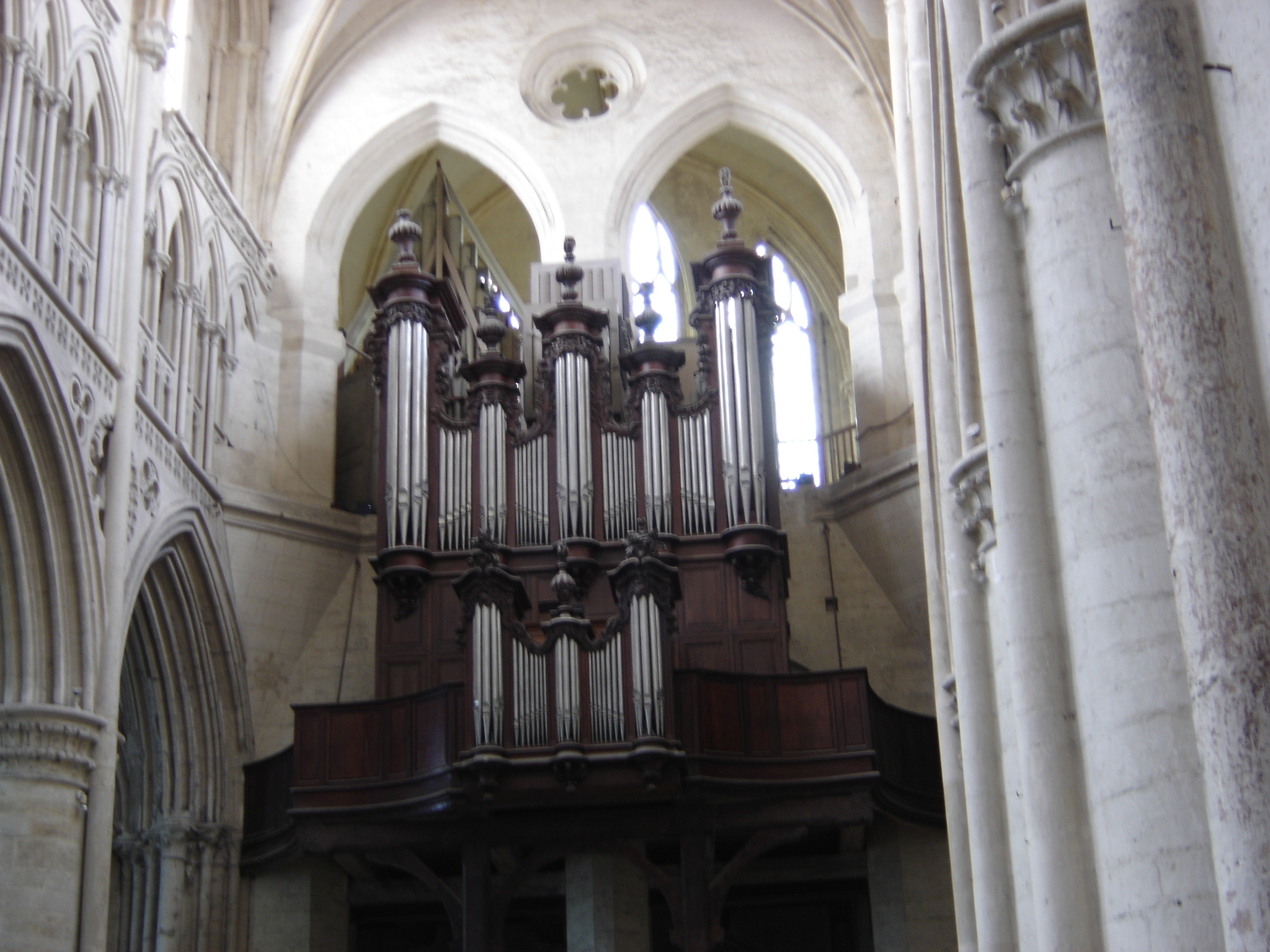
The Parisot organ at Sées Cathedral

Claude Parisot (c. 1704 in Étain – 3 March 1784 in Étain) was a French organ builder. He came from a family of organ builders: his nephew Henri in turn built and repaired many instruments in Lower Normandy and Maine. He learned his art with Moucherel of Lorraine, then in 1727 with Louis-Alexandre and Jean-Baptiste Clicquot in Paris.

Beginning in 1735, Parisot built numerous organs in northern and western France:

- 1736 Church of St Rémy, Dieppe, restored and currently used by the École Nationale de Musique. Numerous recordings available.
- 1741 Premonstratensian abbey of Mondaye (near Bayeux)
- 1747 Notre-Dame de Guibray, Falaise
- Premonstratensian abbey of Séry-aux-Prés (Seine-Maritime)
- Church of St George and Church of the Holy Sepulchre at Abbeville
- Sées Cathedral
- Ardenne Abbey (near Caen)
- Jacobin convent, Caen
- Abbey of St André en Gouffern (near Falaise)
