= Eustache Restout =

French painter (1655–1743)

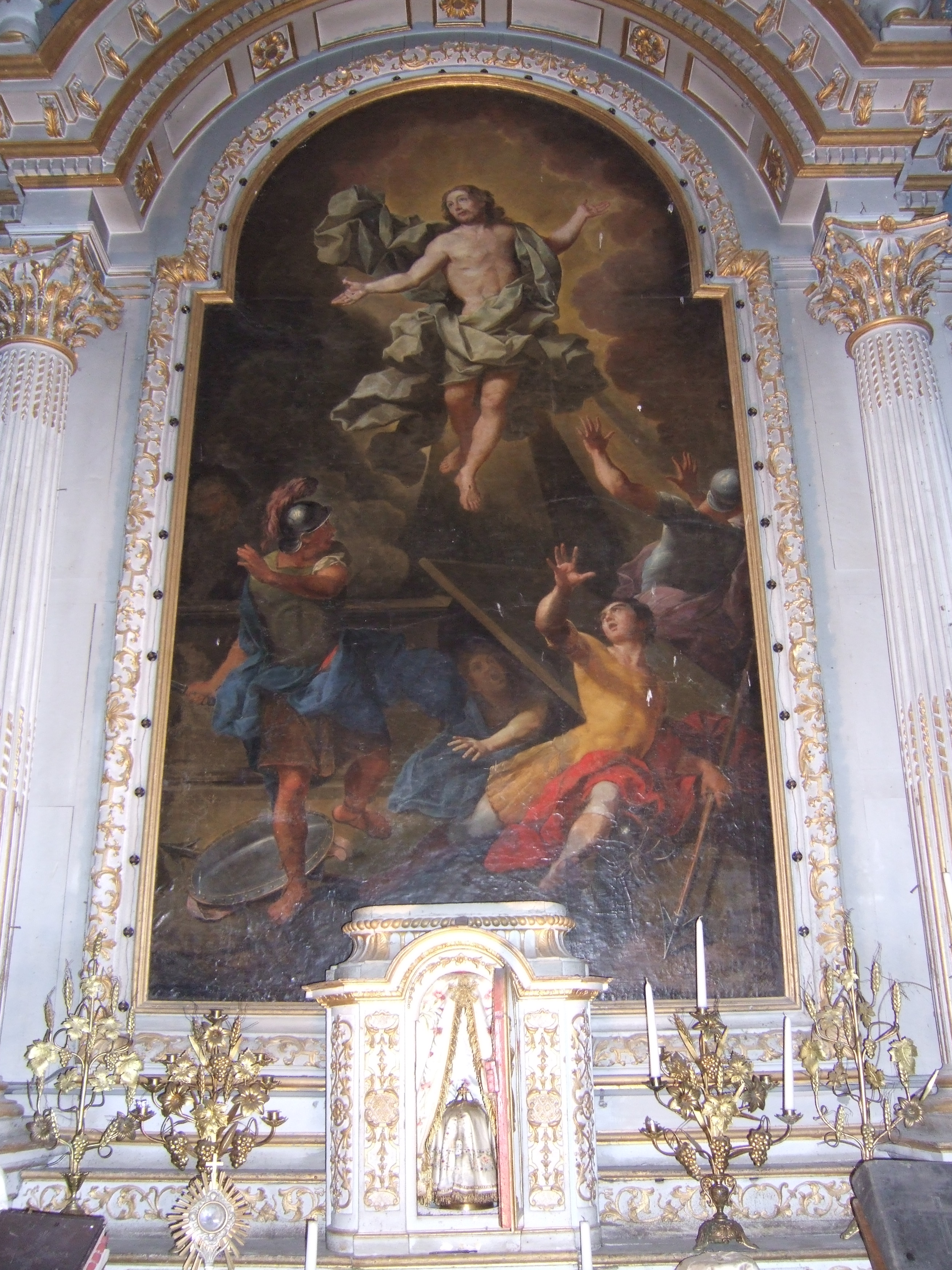
Résurrection by Eustache Restout

Eustache Restout (12 November 1655, in Caen – 1 November 1743, in Mondaye) was a French architect, engraver, painter and Premonstratensian canon regular, belonging to the artistic Restout dynasty. At his death he was sub-prior of abbaye Saint-Martin de Mondaye - he had produced the plans on which that monastery was rebuilt and painted several paintings for it (now in Bayeux Cathedral). His students included his nephew Jean Restout the Younger.
