= Jacques Restout =

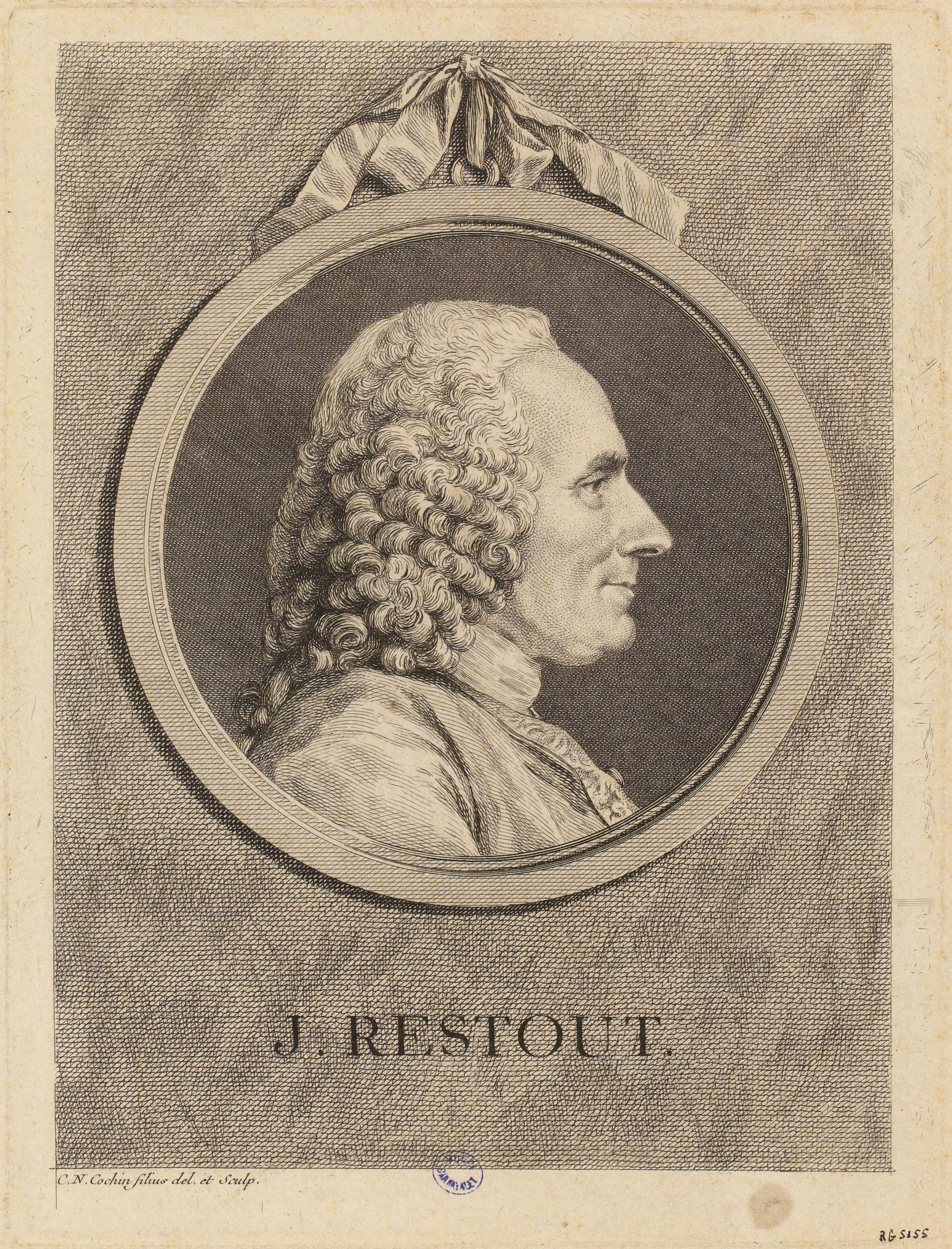

Jacques Restout (c. 1650 – c. 1701) was a French painter of the Restout dynasty (the son of Marc Restout) and a Premonstratensian canon regular. Born in Caen, he was a student of Le Tellier and became prior of the abbaye de Moncets near Reims.

== Works ==
- La Réforme de la Peinture, Caen, J. Briard, 1681
- Traité de l’harmonie des sons
- Translation of Pausanias, surviving in manuscript form
- Translation of a Treatise on the Painting on the Ancients by Franciscus Junius le Jeune, surviving in manuscript form
