= Jean Restout the Younger =

French artist (1692–1768)

- Jean Restout le Jeune
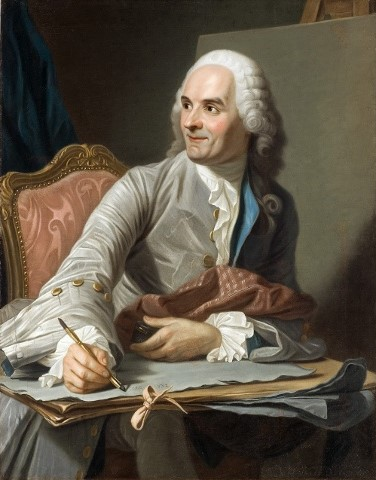
- Portrait by Tadeusz Kuntze after Maurice Quentin de La Tour, 1756
- Born: 26 March 1692; Rouen, Kingdom of France
- Died: 1 January 1768 (aged 75); Paris, Kingdom of France
- Education: Jean Restout the Elder, Jean Jouvenet
- Spouse: Marie-Anne Halli
- Children: Jean-Bernard Restout
- Parents: Jean Restout the Elder (father); Marie Madeleine Jouvenet (mother)
- Family: Restout

Director of the Académie Royale de Peinture et de Sculpture
- In office 1760–1763
- Monarch: Louis XV
- Preceded by: Louis de Silvestre
- Succeeded by: Jacques Dumont le Romain

Jean Restout the Younger (Note: Also known as Jean II Restout or Jean Restout II) (26 March 1692 – 1 January 1768) was a French artist, who worked in painting and drawing. Although little remembered today, Restout was well-respected by his contemporaries for his religious compositions.

== Biography ==
Restout was born in the city of Rouen in Normandy on 26 March 1692. He was a son and pupil of Jean Restout the Elder, a church painter from Caen. His mother, Marie Madeleine Jouvenet (c. 1655 – before 1729), was also an artist and a sister of the famed painter Jean Jouvenet.

Jean Restout the Elder died suddenly in 1702 and thereafter two of his brothers, the artists Jacques and Eustache, cared for the ten-year-old Restout. In 1707, following their introduction to one another by Eustache, Restout entered Jouvenet's studio in Paris. He rose to a position of some importance while there, even assisting his uncle in the completion of his last commissions. Furthermore, Jouvenet gave Restout the majority of his many drawings, a number of which were figure studies.

On 29 May 1717, Restout was admitted to the Académie Royale de Peinture et de Sculpture as an agréé or associate following his submission of the painting Venus Ordering Arms from Vulcan for Aeneas. He evidently prepared an additional, complementary work for the Academy entitled Venus Presenting Arms to Aeneas. Both paintings may have been composed in anticipation of that year's Prix de Rome competition, but apparently Restout only thought about entering the contest as he was not among the April finalists.

Restout's career as a religious painter began in earnest in 1730, when he received a dual commission from the Benedictine abbey at Bourgueil near Chinon. Both paintings, the Ecstasy of St Benedict and the Death of St. Scholastica, center around monastic figures.

In 1729, Restout married Marie-Anne Hallé (1704–1784), daughter of Academy painter Claude-Guy Hallé. In 1732, she gave birth to their only child, Jean-Bernard Restout. He, like his father, had a successful, though rather conventional, painting career: he won the Prix de Rome in 1758, was admitted to the Academy in 1769, and exhibited regularly at the Paris Salon.

Restout died in the Louvre Palace on 1 January 1768. His late baroque classicism rendered his altarpieces, such as the Death of St. Scholastica an isolated achievement that ran counter to his rococo contemporaries.

== Selected works ==
- Saint Bruno in Prayer (1711) – Musée des Beaux-Arts de Dole.
- Portrait of Dom Louis Daudouin du Basset, a Carthusian monk of Gaillon (1716) – Musée des Beaux-Arts de Rouen.
- Venus Ordering Arms from Vulcan for Aeneas (1717) – Los Angeles County Museum of Art.
- Venus Presenting Arms to Aeneas (1717) – Ottawa, National Gallery of Canada.
- Alpheus and Arethusa (1720) – Musée des Beaux-Arts de Rouen.
- Ecstasy of St Benedict (1730) – Musée des Beaux-Arts de Tours.
- Death of St Scholastica (1730) – Musée des Beaux-Arts de Tours.
- Alexander and his Doctor (1747) – Musée de Picardie, Amiens.
- Martyrdom of St. Andrew (1749) – Musée de Grenoble.
- Triumph of Bacchus and Ariadne (1757) – Sanssouci, Potsdam.
- Orpheus and Eurydice (1763) – Musée des Beaux-Arts de Rennes.

== Gallery ==
=== Paintings ===
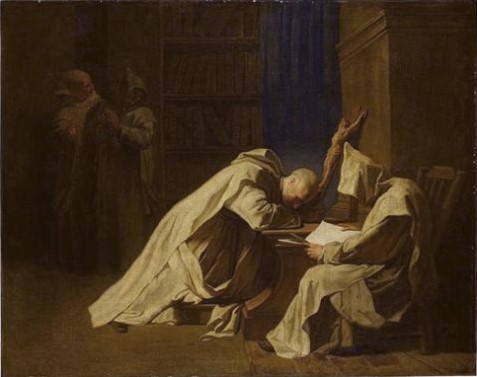
Saint Bruno in Prayer (1711)

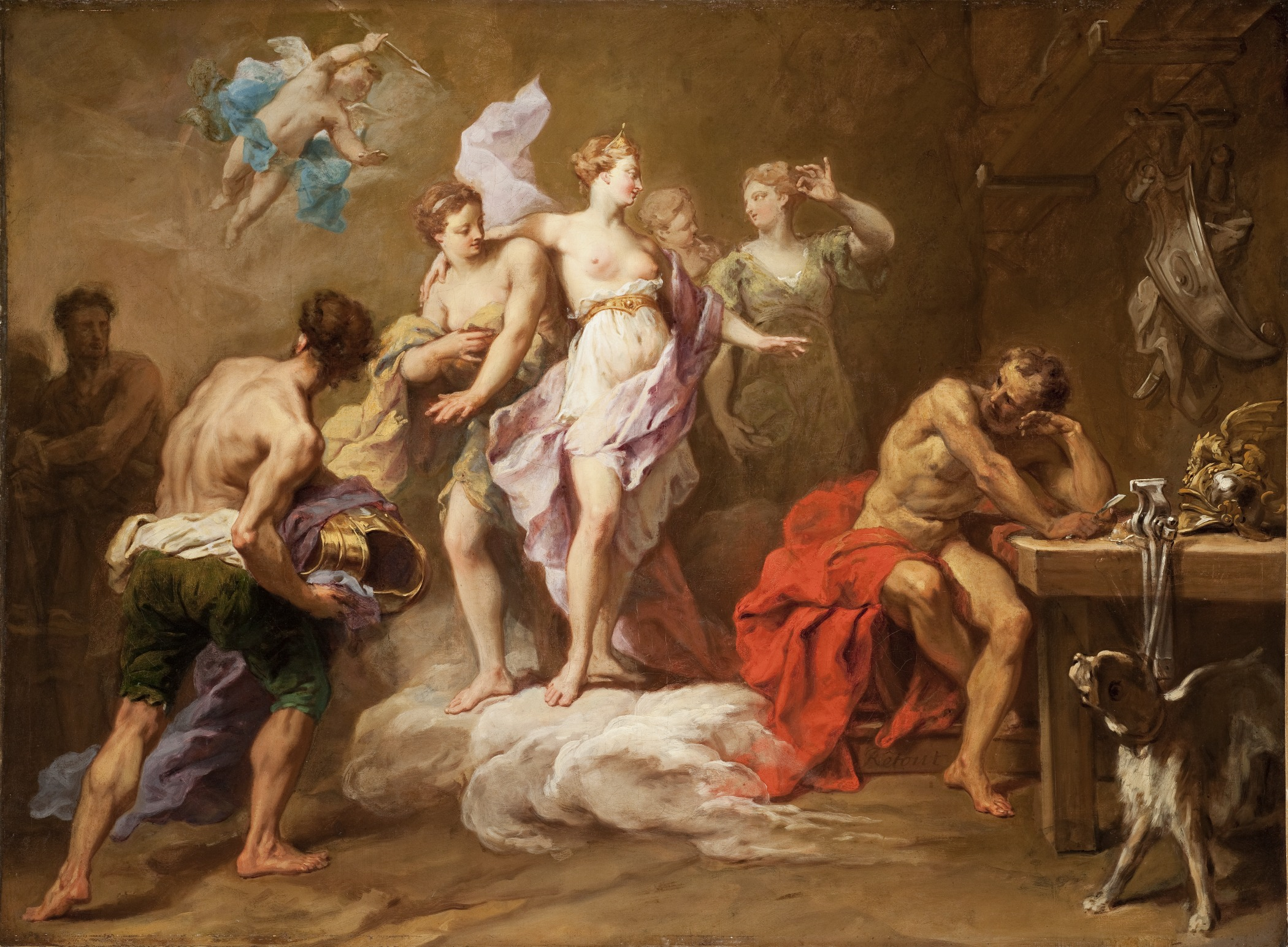
Venus Ordering Arms from Vulcan for Aeneas (1717)

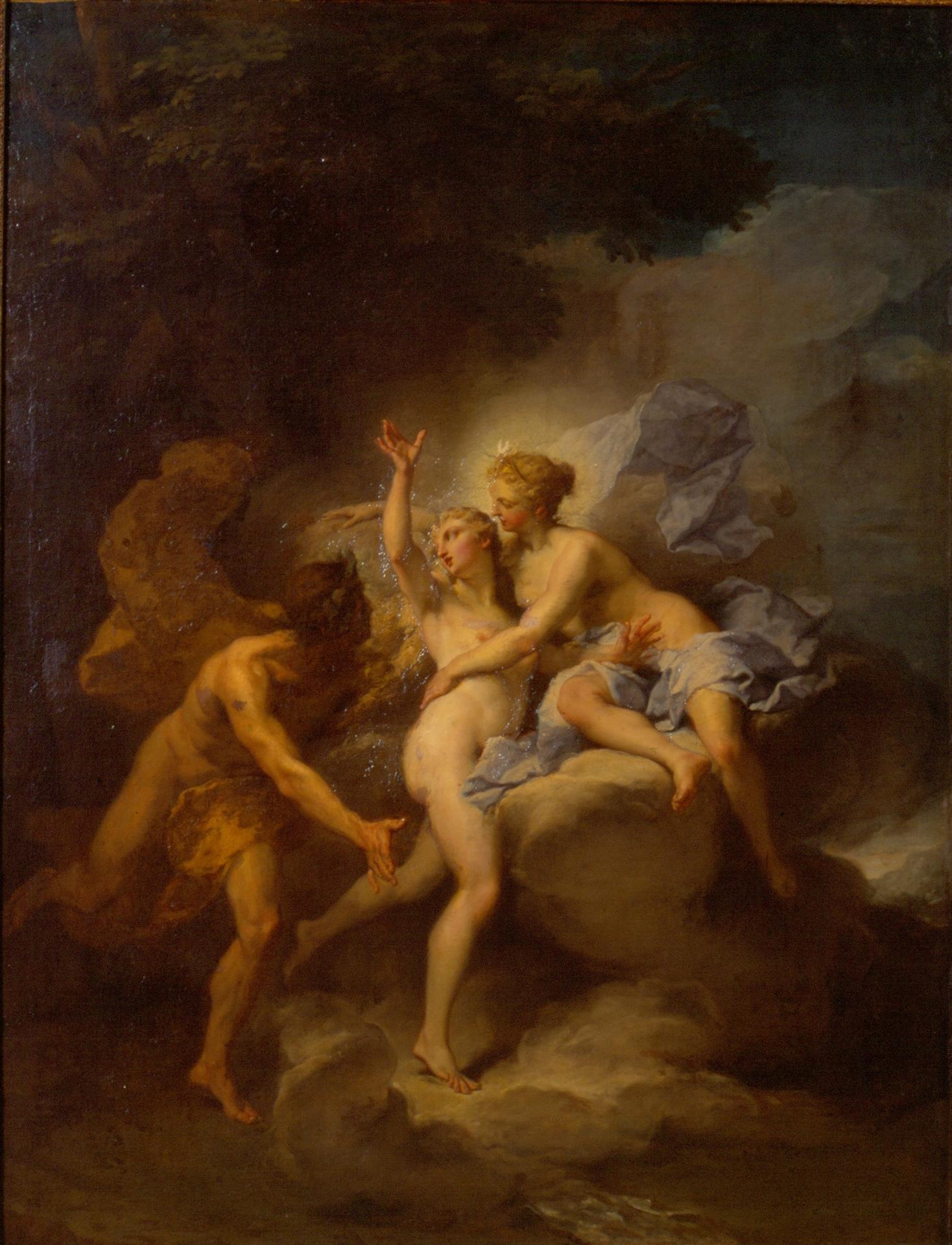
Alpheus and Arethusa (1720)

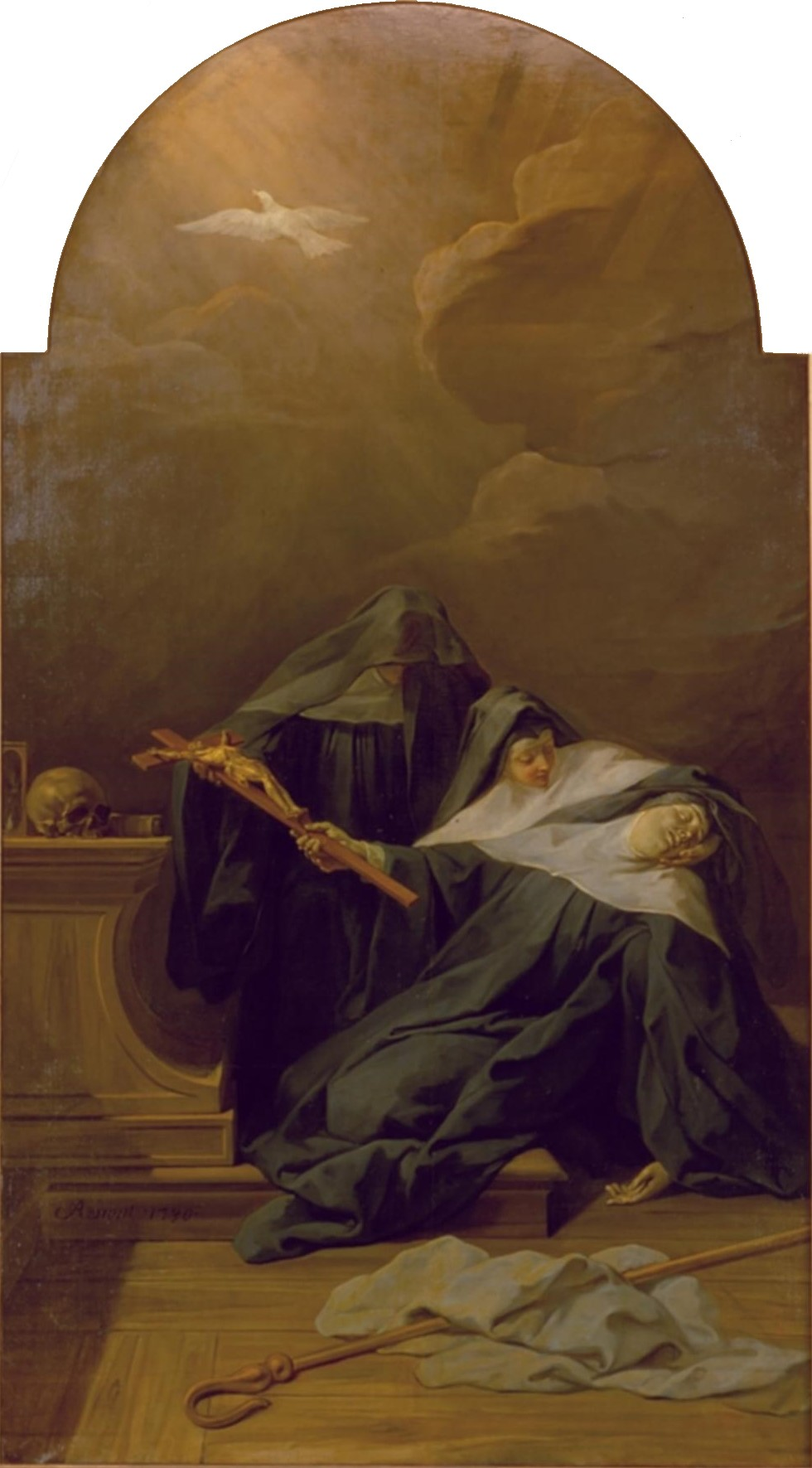
Death of St Scholastica (1730)

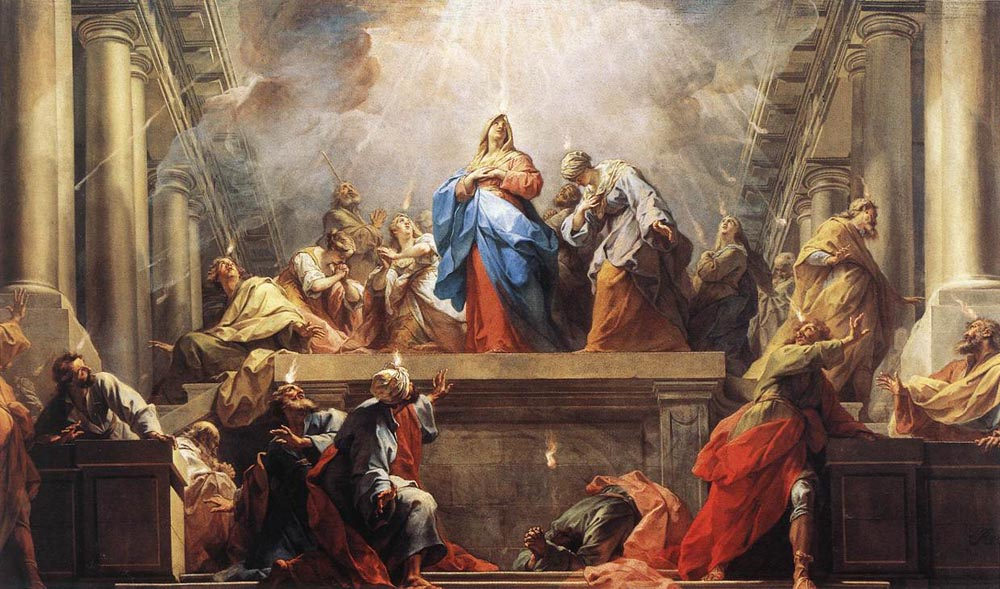
Pentecost (1732)

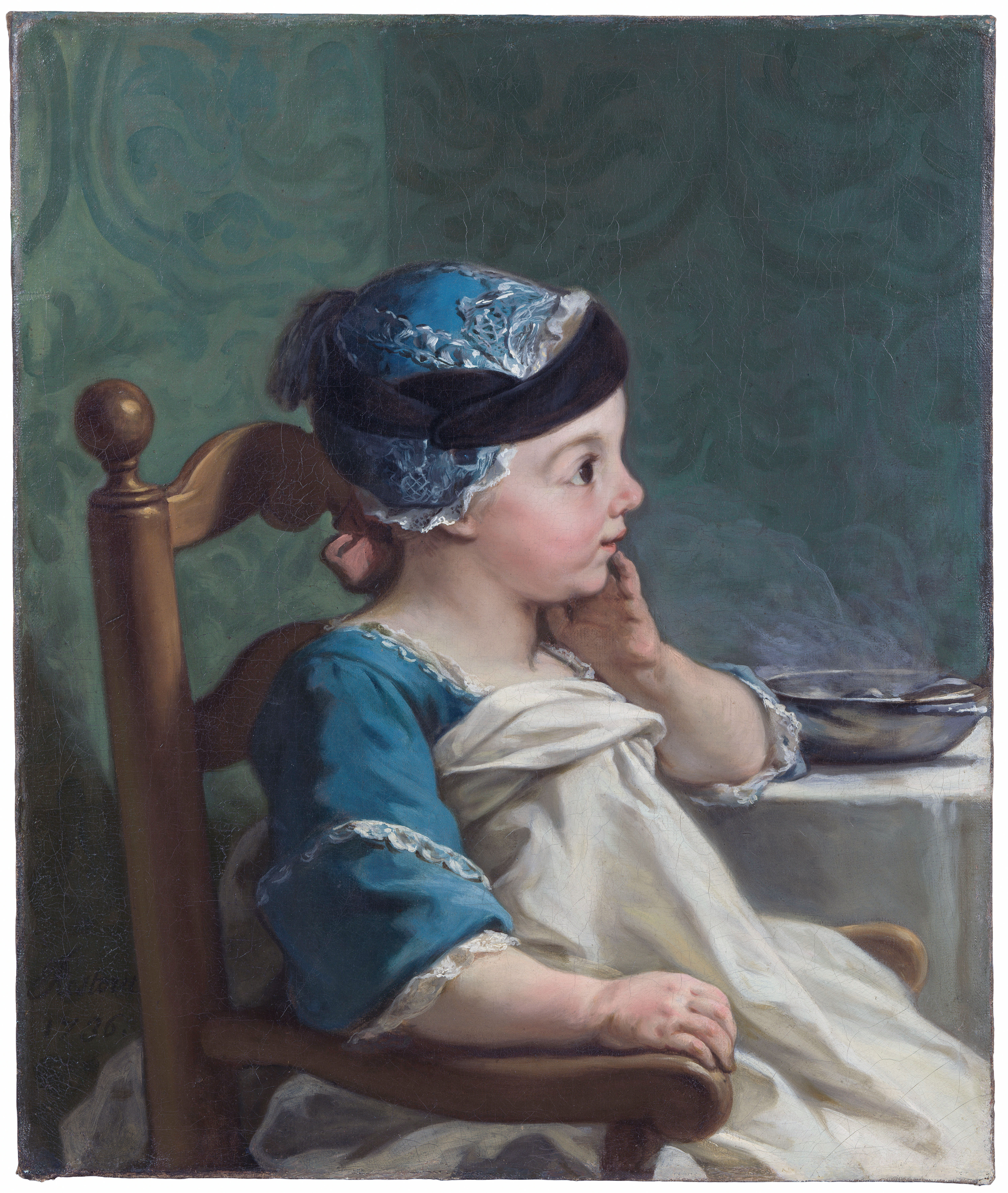
Boy in a Child's Chair or Portrait de Jean-Bernard Restout (1736)

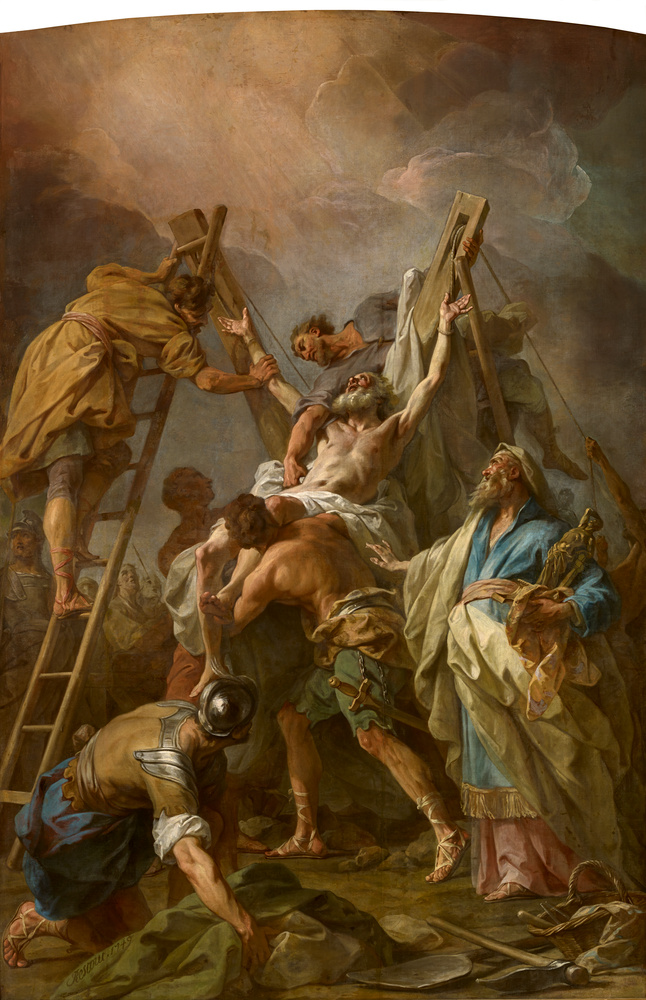
Martyrdom of St. Andrew (1749)

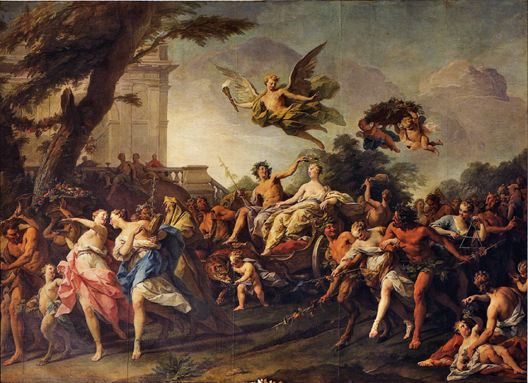
Triumph of Bacchus and Ariadne (1757)

=== Drawings ===
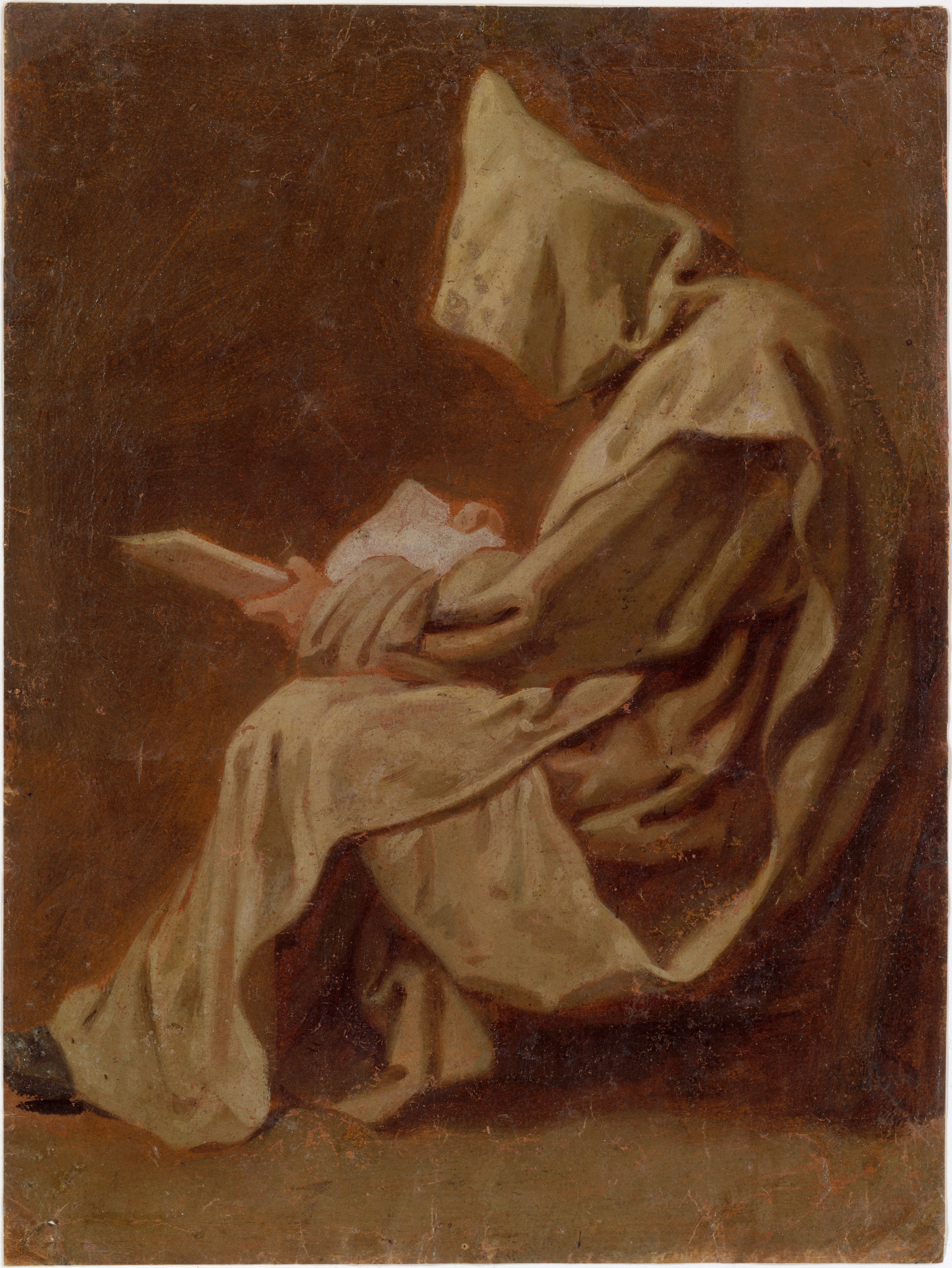
Seated Carthusian Holding an Open Book (1711)

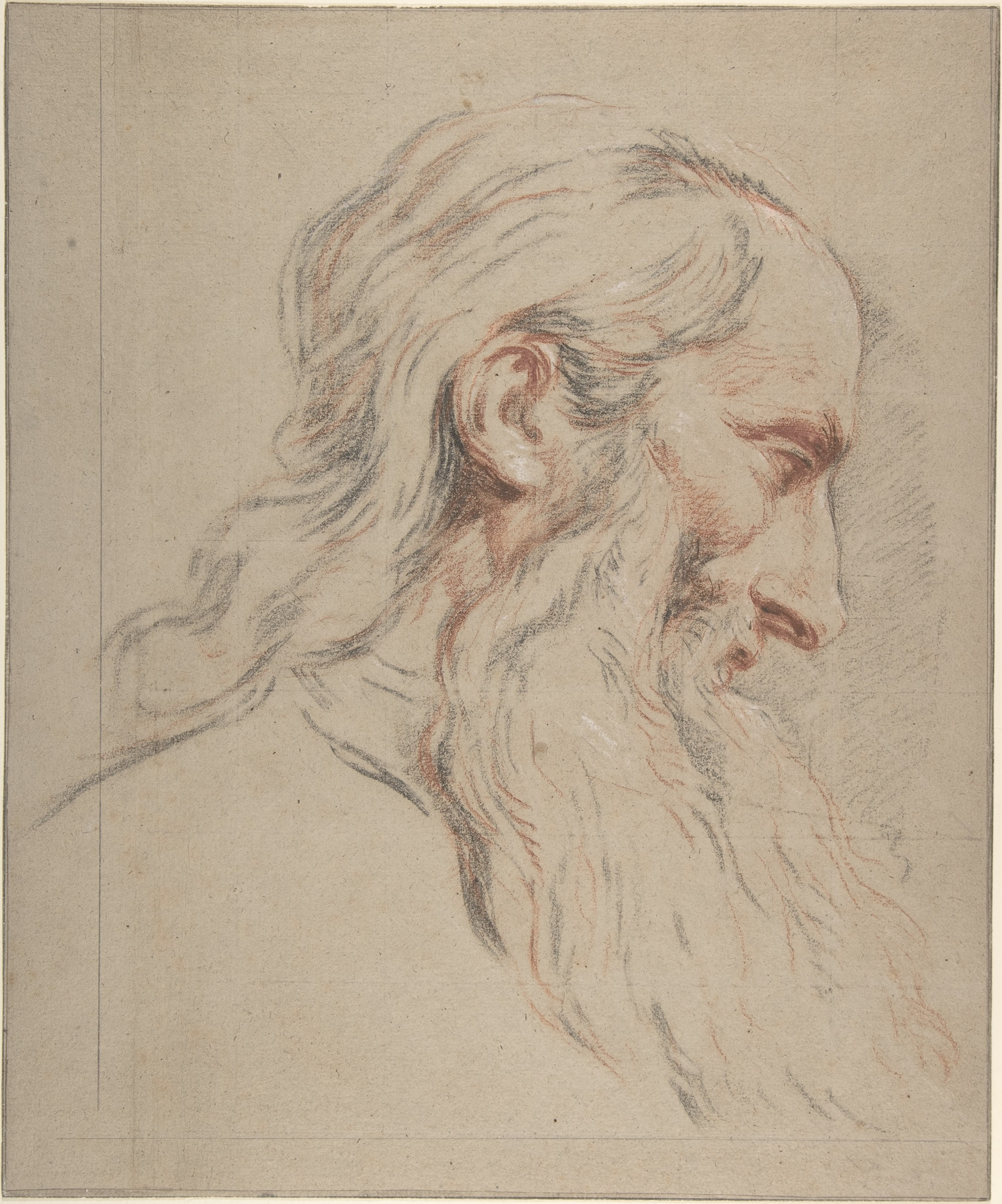
Head of a Bearded Man (c. 1750)

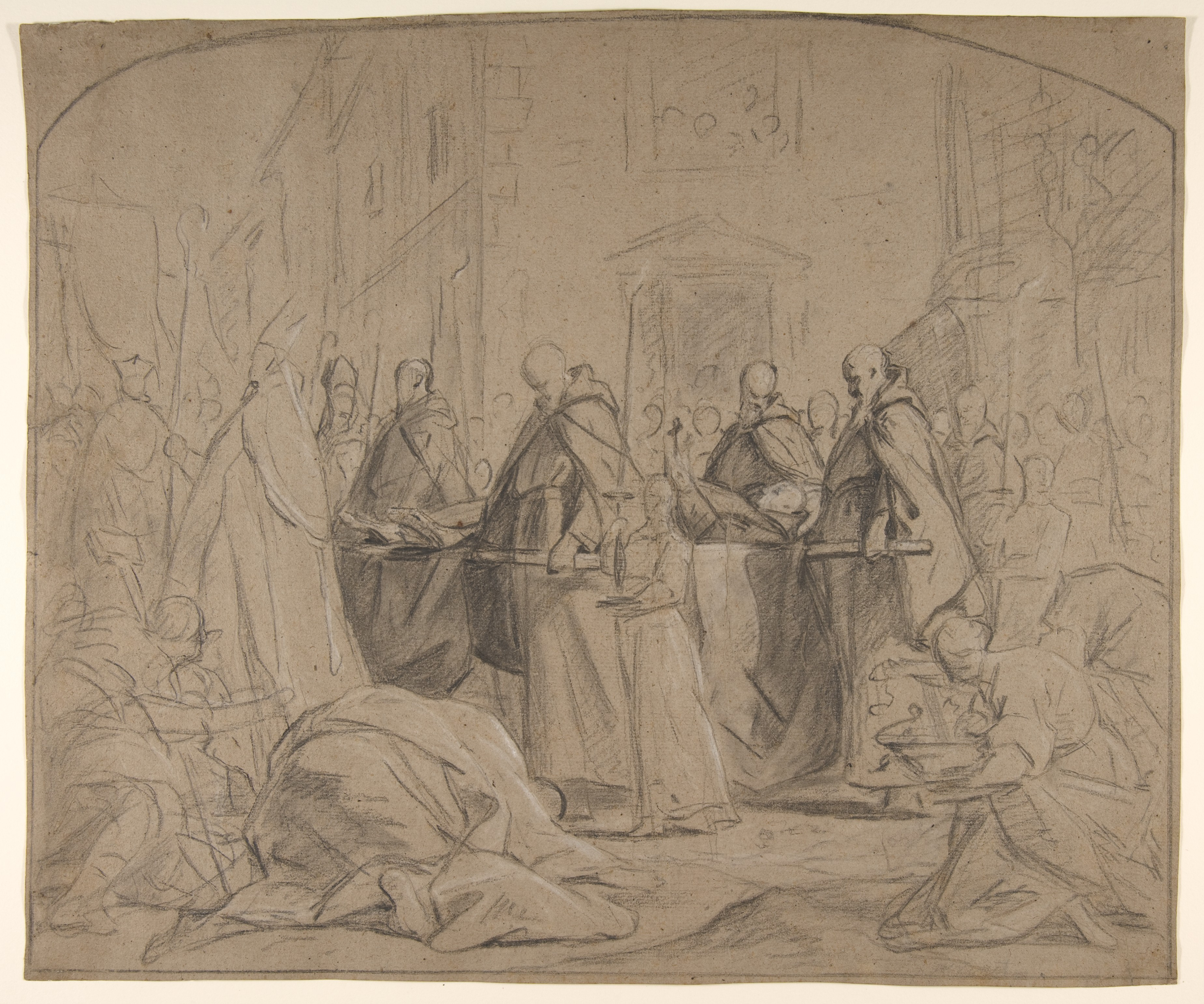
Funeral of François Duplessis de Mornay
