= Juaye-Mondaye =

- Commune
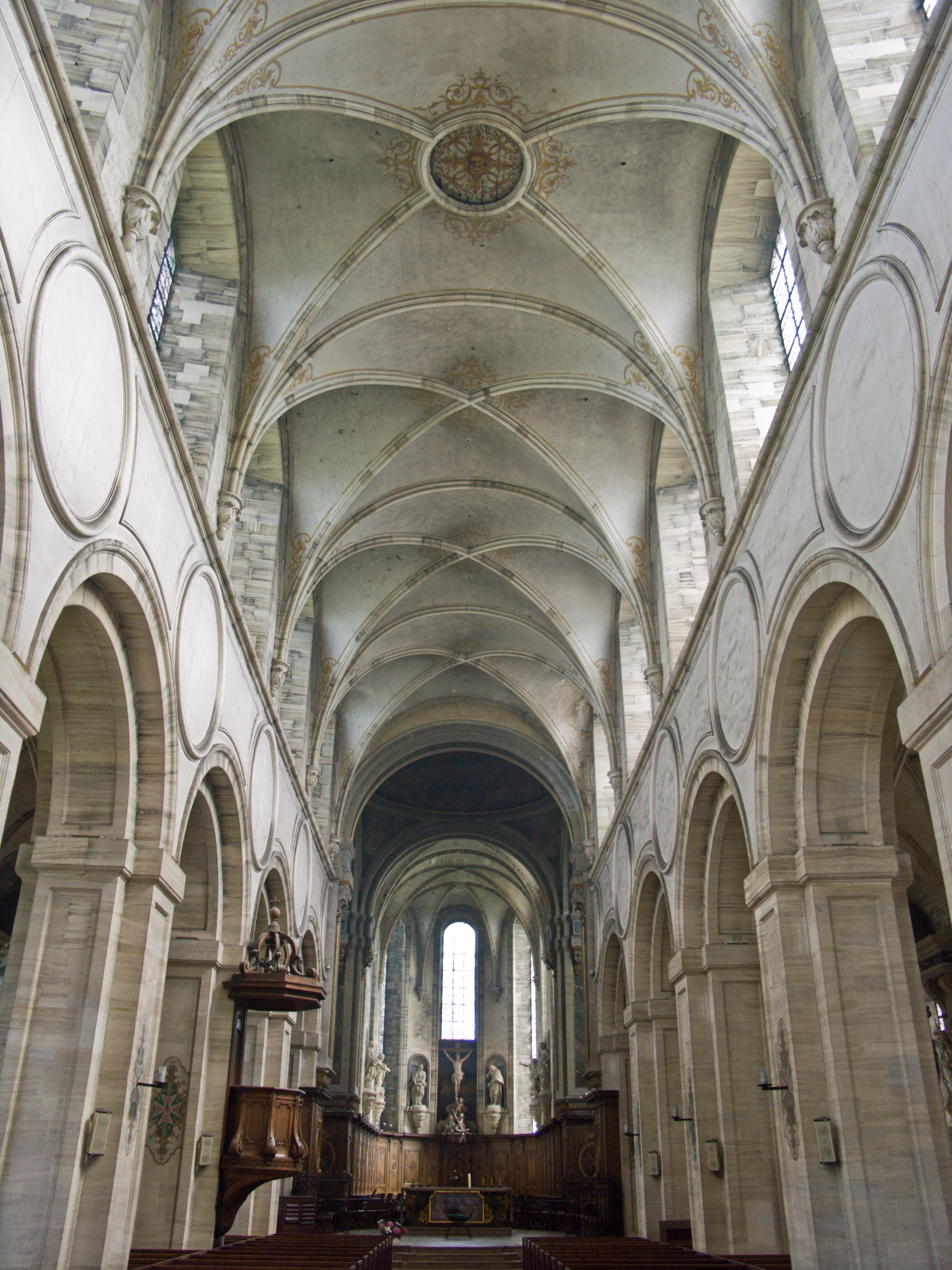
- Abbey church
- Location of Juaye-Mondaye
- Location within France Location within Normandy
- Coordinates: 49°12′26″N 0°41′12″W
- Country: France
- Region: Normandy
- Department: Calvados
- Arrondissement: Bayeux
- Canton: Bayeux
- Intercommunality: CC Bayeux Intercom

Government
  - Mayor (2020–2026): Jérôme Berger
- Area^{1}: 16.12 km^{2} (6.22 sq mi)
- Elevation: 70 m (230 ft)
- Highest elevation: 118 m (387 ft)
- Lowest elevation: 44 m (144 ft)
- Population (2023): 703
  - Density: 43.6/km^{2} (113/sq mi)
- Time zone: UTC+01:00 (CET)
  - Summer (DST): UTC+02:00 (CEST)
- INSEE/Postal code: 14346 /14250
- ^{1} French Land Register data, which excludes lakes, ponds, glaciers > 1 km^{2} (0.386 sq mi or 247 acres) and river estuaries.

Juaye-Mondaye (French pronunciation: [ʒɥɛ mɔ̃dɛ]) is a commune in the Calvados department in the Normandy region in northwestern France. It is most notable for its abbey.

== Population ==
Historical population
Year	Pop.	±% p.a.
1968	573	—
1975	520	−1.38%
1982	533	+0.35%
1990	616	+1.83%
1999	623	+0.13%
2007	687	+1.23%
2012	673	−0.41%
2017	670	−0.09%
2023	703	+0.80%
Source: INSEE

== See also ==
- Communes of the Calvados department
