= Jean-Bernard Restout =

French painter (1732–1797)

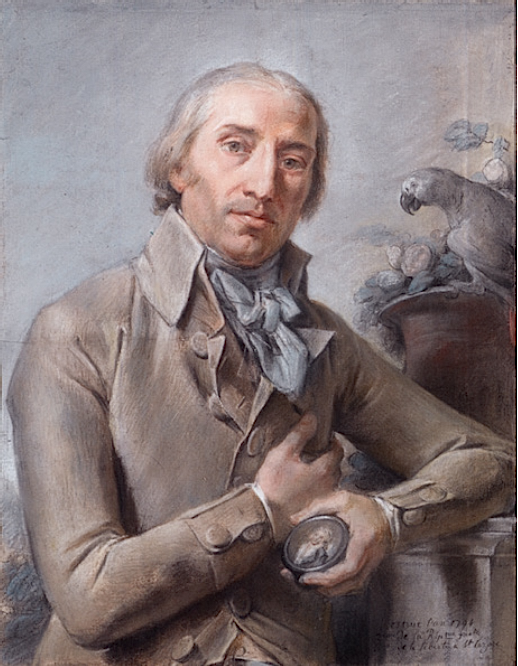
Autoportrait tenant une miniature, 1794

Jean-Bernard Restout (22 February 1732 – 18 July 1797) was a French painter.

== Life ==
Sleep, 1771

Restout was born and died in Paris. A son of Jean Restout the Younger and like him a member of the Académie de Rouen, he won the Prix de Rome in 1758 and was aggregated to the Académie royale on his return from Italy in 1765, then received into it in 1769. However, his refusal to conform to its rules led to a quarrel.

He frequently exhibited at the Salon de Paris from 1767 to 1791. On the French Revolution, he was president of the Commune des Arts which campaigned, with its founder David, for the suppression of the Académie.

Made guardian of the Garde-Meuble royal by Roland during the Revolution, this favour nearly cost him his life during the Reign of Terror when Roland and his friends were implicated in the theft from the Garde-Meuble. Suspected, he was imprisoned and only released after the 9 Thermidor coup d'etat (27 July 1794) that deposed Robespierre.

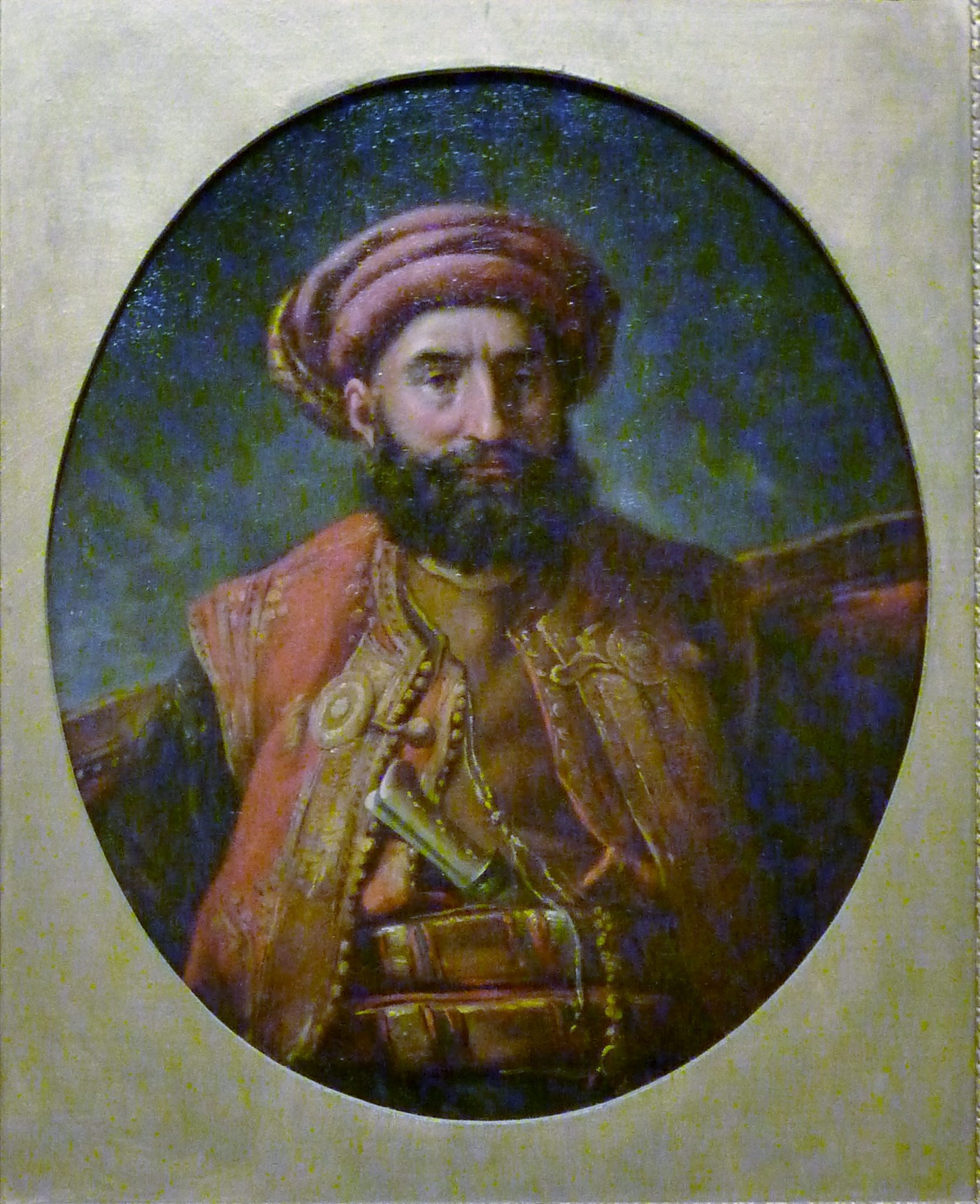
Portrait of Suleiman Aga, 1777

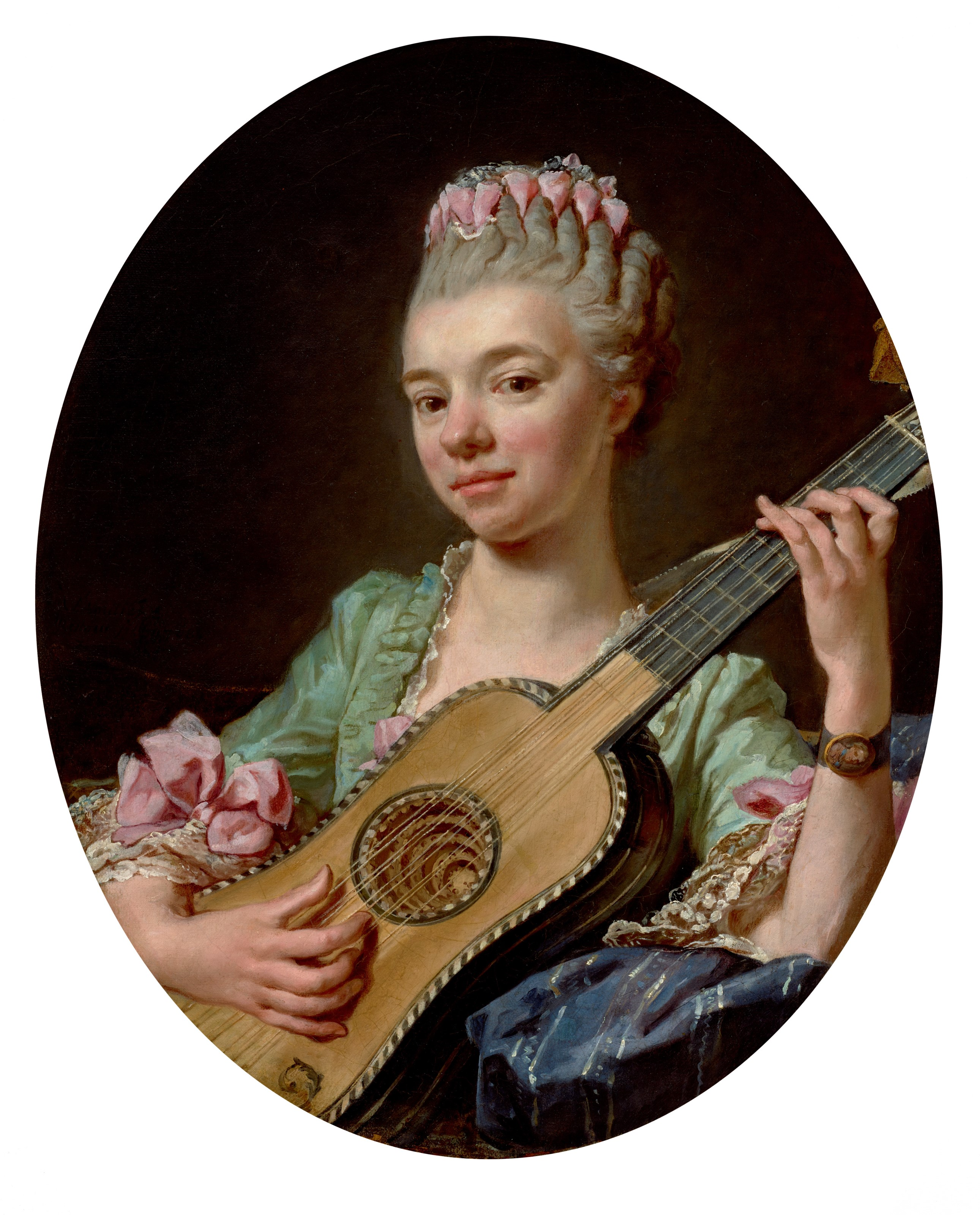
Young Woman with a Guitar, 1768

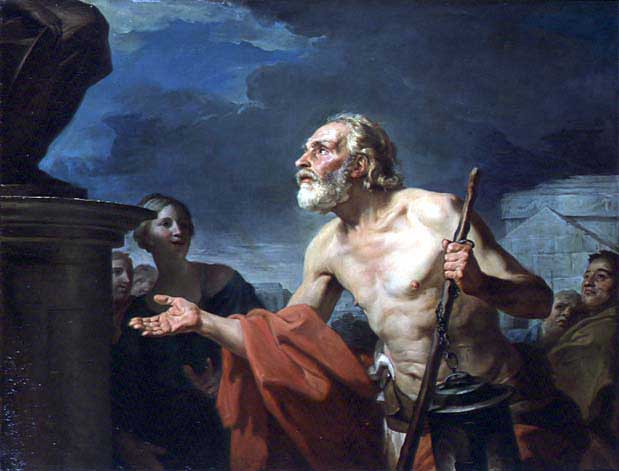
Diogenes Asking for Alms, 1767. Musee des Augustins, Toulouse, France

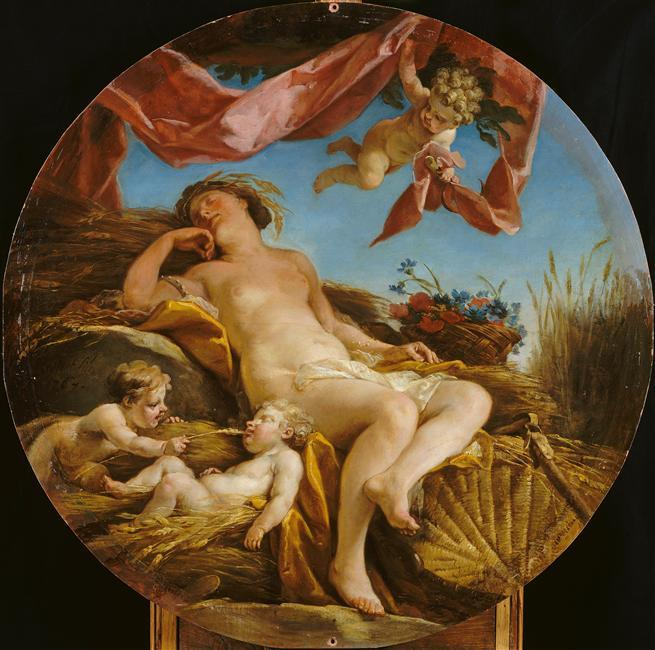
Summer

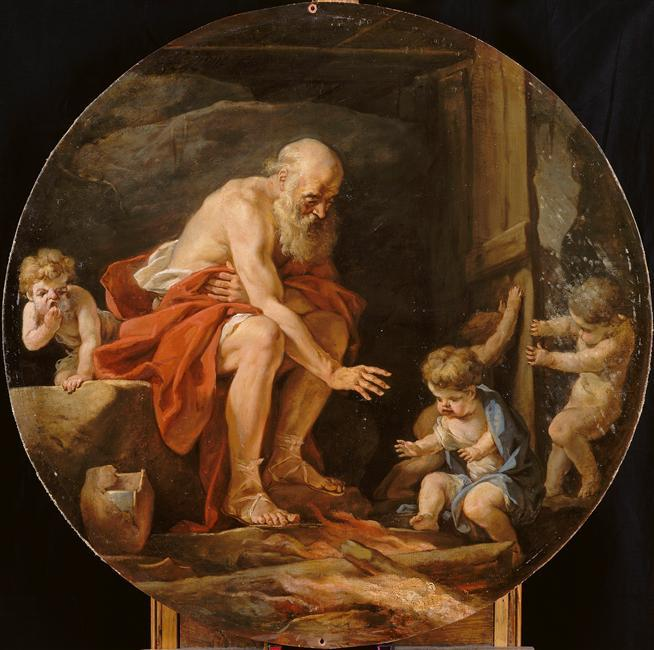
Winter

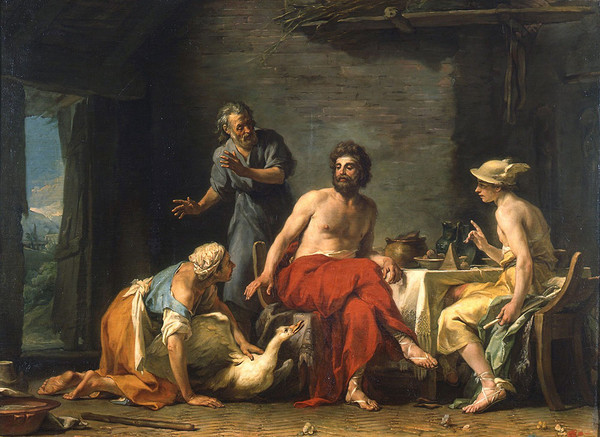
Philemon and Baucis giving hospitality to Jupiter and Mercury, 1769

== Bibliography ==
- Galerie française ou Portraits des hommes et des femmes célébres qui ont paru en France, Paris, Herrissant le Fils, 1771
- Anatole Granges de Surgères, Artistes français des XVIIe et XVIIIe siècles (1681-1787), Paris, Charavay, 1893
