= Jean Restout the Elder =

French painter (1666–1702)

Jean Restout the Elder (15 November 1666, in Caen – 20 October 1702, in Rouen) was a French painter. He was part of the Restout dynasty of painters, studying under his father Marguerin Restout. He is called "the Elder" to distinguish him from his son Jean Restout the Younger, an accomplished painter of religious images.

He married Marie Madeleine Jouvenet (c. 1655 – before 1729), sister of the painter Jean Jouvenet, and his style resembles that of his brother-in-law so closely that many of Restout's paintings are misattributed to Jouvenet.
