= Ray Richardson =

Ray Richardson is the name of:

- Ray Richardson (artist) (born 1964), British painter
- Ray Richardson (footballer) (born 1959), English footballer
