= Ceccotti =

Ceccotti is an Italian surname. Notable people with the surname include:

- Rodolfo Ceccotti (born 1945), Italian painter
- Sergio Ceccotti (born 1935), Italian painter
