= Alain Blondel (art dealer) =

French art dealer (1939–2026)

Alain Blondel (1939 – 12 June 2026) was a French art dealer specialising in Art Deco and contemporary art.

== Life and career ==
Alain Blondel was born in 1939. In 1959 Blondel began studying architecture at the École des Beaux-Arts in Paris, which led him to discover the forgotten work of the Parisian Art Nouveau architect Hector Guimard. In 1964, he co-directed a short film about this architect, Hectorologie, which won the Golden Lion at the 1965 Venice Film Festival in the category of art documentaries.

=== Luxembourg Gallery ===
In 1967, with his sister Françoise, her friend and future hused in paintings, artists' rugs and furniture from the period 1900–1925. In 1968, the gallery moved to Rue de Tournon in a shared room with Alain Lesieutre, taking the name galerie du Luxembourg [Luxembourg Gallery] because of its proximity to the Senate, then moved in 1970 or 1971 to 98, Rue Saint-Denis, in a former banana ripening shed. Continuing to explore the then-disdained artistic movements of Art Nouveau and Art Deco, he made contact with the best surviving representatives of these movements. The gallery produced numerous retrospectives of painters and decorators from the 1920s and 1930s, which would constitute numerous discoveries: Tamara de Lempicka in 1972, Burne-Jones and the influence of the Pre-Raphaelites in 1972, Bernard Boutet de Monvel, the sculptor Rupert Carabin in 1974, the lacquerer Jean Dunand in 1975, neoclassical painters of the 1930s, in 1976. Some of these works have enriched prestigious collections, such as those of the Musée d’Orsay and the Metropolitan Museum of Art. In 1970, he participated in the development of the first Guimard retrospective at the Museum of Modern Art, which then exhibited at the Museum of Decorative Arts in Paris.

=== Alain Blondel Gallery ===
After the disappearance of the Luxembourg gallery in 1978, Blondel opened a gallery under his name with his wife Michèle at 4, rue Aubry le Boucher, near the Centre Pompidou. The Alain Blondel gallery continues to organise important retrospectives (Jean Dupas in 1980, Pierre Marcel-Béronneau in 1981, Mayo in 1985, Hector Guimard in 1992 and Federico Beltrán Masses in 2012) but specialised in promoting contemporary figurative art. From the 1980s onwards, the gallery began a lasting collaboration with its artists, whom it supported by participating in numerous contemporary art fairs and publishing exhibition catalogues.

In 1999, Alain Blondel published the book Tamara de Lempicka: a Catalogue Raisonné 1921–1980 on the work of Tamara de Lempicka. Since then, he has helped to organise several retrospectives of this artist at London's Royal Academy of Arts in 2004, Milan's Palazzo Reale in 2006, Mexico City's Palacio de Bellas Artes in 2009, and Tokyo's Bunkamura in 2010.

In 2004, the Alain Blondel gallery left its premises near the Centre Pompidou to move to the Marais district. At the end of 2014 before retiring, Alain and Michèle Blondel organised their last exposition, Jürg Kreienbühl – Le Muséum d'histoire naturelle [The Natural History Museum], one of the first contemporary painters they supported from the 1970s.

Jean-Marie Oger – his former collaborator for around ten years – has continued to represent certain artists from the gallery since 2015.

=== Death ===
Blondel died on 12 June 2026, at the age of 86.

== Artists represented by the Alain Blondel gallery ==
- Angélique
- Michael Bastow
- Sergio Ceccotti
- Marie-Antoinette Chalus
- Monique de Roux
- Raymond Daussy
- Paul Day
- Richard Harper
- Léo Heinquet
- Jürg Kreienbühl
- Jean-Marc Lange
- Pierre Lamalattie
- Ivan Lubennikov
- Mayo
- Alessandro Papetti
- Pénélope
- Jean-Marie Poumeyrol
- Christian Renonciat
- Ray Richardson
- José Seguiri
- Francine Van Hove
- Norbert Wagenbrett
- Zoltán Zsakó
- Gérard Puvis

== Awards ==
- Chevalier des Arts et Lettres (1996)
