= Ivan Lubennikov =

Russian painter (1951–2021)

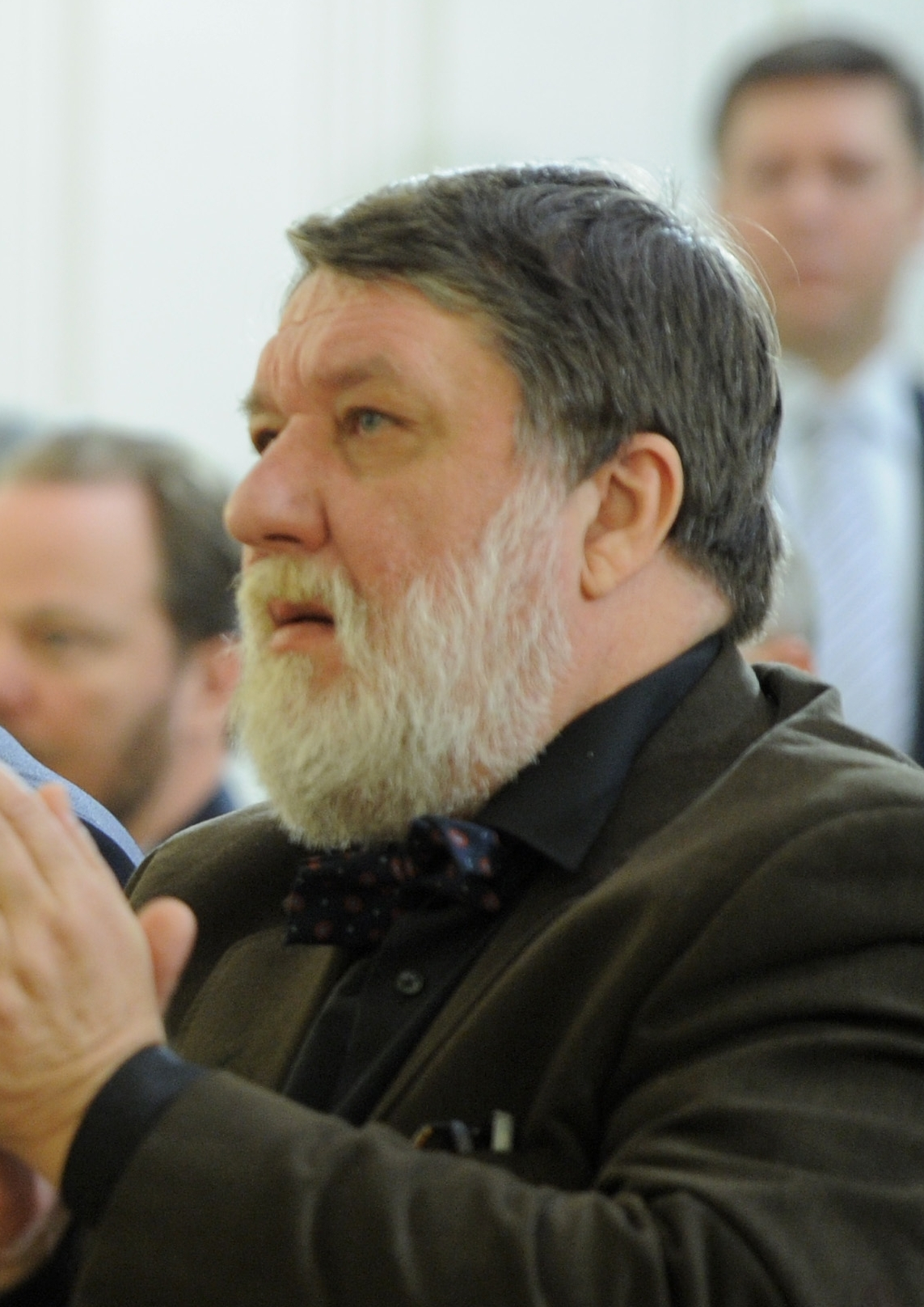
2012

Ivan Leonidovich Lubennikov (Russian: Иван Леонидович Лубенников, 14 May 1951 – 3 October 2021) was a Minsk, Belarus-born painter, who lived and worked in Moscow.

== Early life and education ==
Lubennikov spent his childhood in Siberia whose memory, especially hunting and fishing, spreads through his pictorial and literary artworks. He moved to Moscow at 14 years old and entered the Surikov Art Institute in Moscow a few years later in the monumental art department.

== Career ==
Having graduated in 1976, Lubennikov mainly dedicated himself to the realization of large fresco murals until the beginning of the 1990s. In 1982 his mural painting for the public room of the Tryokhgorka manufacture was awarded the prize of the Union of the Artists of Moscow. It was the first of his numerous monumental artworks, which included the decoration of the façade and interior of the new train station of Zvenigorod (first prize of the Foundation of the Artists of Moscow), memorial monument for the Russian section of the Auschwitz-Birkenau State Museum with the architect Alexandr Skolan in 1985, and intervention with laminated iron on the old façades of the Taganka Theatre in Moscow in 1987. Most of his realizations were destroyed during the last years of the Soviet regime; an exception is one of his emblematic artworks, the design of the State Museum Vladimir Mayakovsky in 1991.

Lubennikov began to show his paintings in the first years of the 1980s but it was his first important solo exhibition in a Muscovite gallery in 1987 which brought him recognition. The majority of these exhibited paintings are now part of Russian regional museums’ collections. The end of the 1980s and the beginning of the 1990s correspond to the peak of interest from foreign collectors in Russian art; during this period his paintings were acquired by great German collectors, such as Henri Nannen or Peter Ludwig who now owns around twenty of his works.

The economic problems of the New Russia put a stop to his architectural works. The early 1990s marked the beginning of a 15-year period entirely devoted to painting and characterized by the use of black background. Profoundly Russian, his painting switched between ironic detachment and hedonism, popular culture and artistic references. Lubennikov recognized the influence of Paul Delvaux and has many times declared his admiration for Matisse, Caravaggio, Zurbarán and the art of icons in their way of constructing space. With a high sense of composition and an approach intentionally aestheticized, Lubennikov continually reinvents his main subjects: nudes, still lifes, Siberian landscapes.

Professor at the Monumental art department of the Surikov Art Institute in Moscow since 1994, he was chosen to realize with his students in 2005 the decoration of three Muscovite metro stations: Mayakovskaya in 2005 (awarded the international prize Vladimir Mayakovsky in 2009 and the gold medal of the Russian Academy of Arts), Sretensky Bulvar in 2007 and Slavyansky Bulvar in 2008. Each station was designed in different materials: stained glass, mosaics, cast iron, etched steel. In 2009, he created a 40m² artwork made with 20 glass-stained panels for the Madeleine. Named Chicken Ryaba, this monumental work tells the story of Russia through its symbols. This public commission was offered by the city of Moscow to the RATP Group in thanks for the donation of an ensemble by Hector Guimard to the Muscovite metro station Kiyevskaya.

In October 2011, a monograph in two volumes was published for his retrospective exhibition at the Central House of Artists in Moscow to celebrate his sixtieth birthday. The first volume reproduces more than two hundred paintings and a dozen images of architectural works. The second volume is a collection of literary text by the painter. A second book of his texts has been published in 2013 by Free Artists Editions in St-Petersburg.

Academician of the Russian Academy of Arts, and named People's Artist, he was honoured with the Order of Friendship in October 2011.

== Solo exhibitions (selection) ==
- 1987: Street Kachirka gallery, Moscow
- 1991: Modern Art gallery, Moscow
- 1993: Russian Collection gallery, Moscow
- 1993: Maya Polsky gallery, Chicago
- 1994: Galerie Alain Blondel, Paris
- 1996: Maya Polsky gallery, Chicago
- 1997: Galerie Alain Blondel, Paris
- 1998: Galerie De twee Pauwen, The Hague
- 1999: Lubennikov and his women, Ensemble gallery, Moscow
- 2000: Galerie Alain Blondel, Paris
- 2001: 50 years Le Manège, Moscow
- 2003: Galerie Sanat Teşvikiye, Istanbul
- 2004: Galerie De twee Pauwen, The Hague
- 2005: Galerie Alain Blondel, Paris
- 2005: Galerie De twee Pauwen, The Hague
- 2010: Galerie Alain Blondel, Paris
- 2011: The price of Freedom, retrospective exhibition at the Central House of Artists, Moscow
- 2013: Luncheon on the Grass, Tchistie proudi gallery, Moscow
- 2014: Forms of living, Must Art gallery, Moscow

== Collective exhibitions (selection) ==
- 1985: Traditions and current events, Düsseldorf, Hanover, Stuttgart
- 1986: Galerie Petagnen, Berlin
- 1988: USSR - New trends, Bologna
- 1989: Muscovite Artists, galleria Marconi, Milan
- 1992: The Tale of bread and tears, Križanke Outdoor Theatre, Ljubljana
- 1993: Life, Love, Death, Bordhigera
- 1994: Central House of Artists, Moscow
- 1995: The Artist and the Muse, Spaziotempo Centro d'Arte, Florence
- 1995: The Russian House, Central House of Artists, Moscow
- 1996: In memory of G. Kroutynskiy, Central House of Artists, Moscow
- 1997: Illusions and reality, Central House of Artists, Moscow
- 1999: Ivan + Natalia, Central House of Artists, Moscow,
- 2002: Collective exhibition of the candidates to the State prize, State Tretyakov Gallery
- 2006: Inhabited islands, State Tretyakov Gallery, Moscow
- 2006: Spirit expression, Nachekin’s House gallery, Moscow
- 2007: Greenhouse, Central House of Artists, Moscow. Russian Arts exhibition at the turn of 20-21 centuries, Peace & Colour Gallery, London
- 2021: The Cool and the Cold: Painting in the USA and the USSR 1960–1990. Ludwig Collection, Gropius Bau, Berlin

== Public and private collections (selection) ==
- State Tretyakov Gallery, Moscow
- Russian Museum St-Petersburg
- Russian Academy of Arts, St-Petersburg
- Museums of Novosibirsk, Novokouznetsk, Almaty, Orenburg, Rostov-on-Don, Kemerovo, Semey, Ivanovo, Kirov
- Ludwig Museum

== Bibliography (selection) ==
- Ivan Loubennikov, exhibition catalogue, Galerie Alain Blondel, Paris, 1999.
- 1980s Russian Art: The Best of The “Inhabited Islands” collection, catalogue d’exposition, Galerie Nationale de Tretyakov, Moscow, 2007
- Ivan Lubennikov. Works in Architecture. Painting. Book for Reading (2 volumes) with the support of the Ministry of Culture of the Russian Federation and of the Federal Press Agency, Agey Tomesh/WAM Publishing Group, 2011.
