= Jürg Kreienbühl =

Swiss-born French painter (1932-2007)

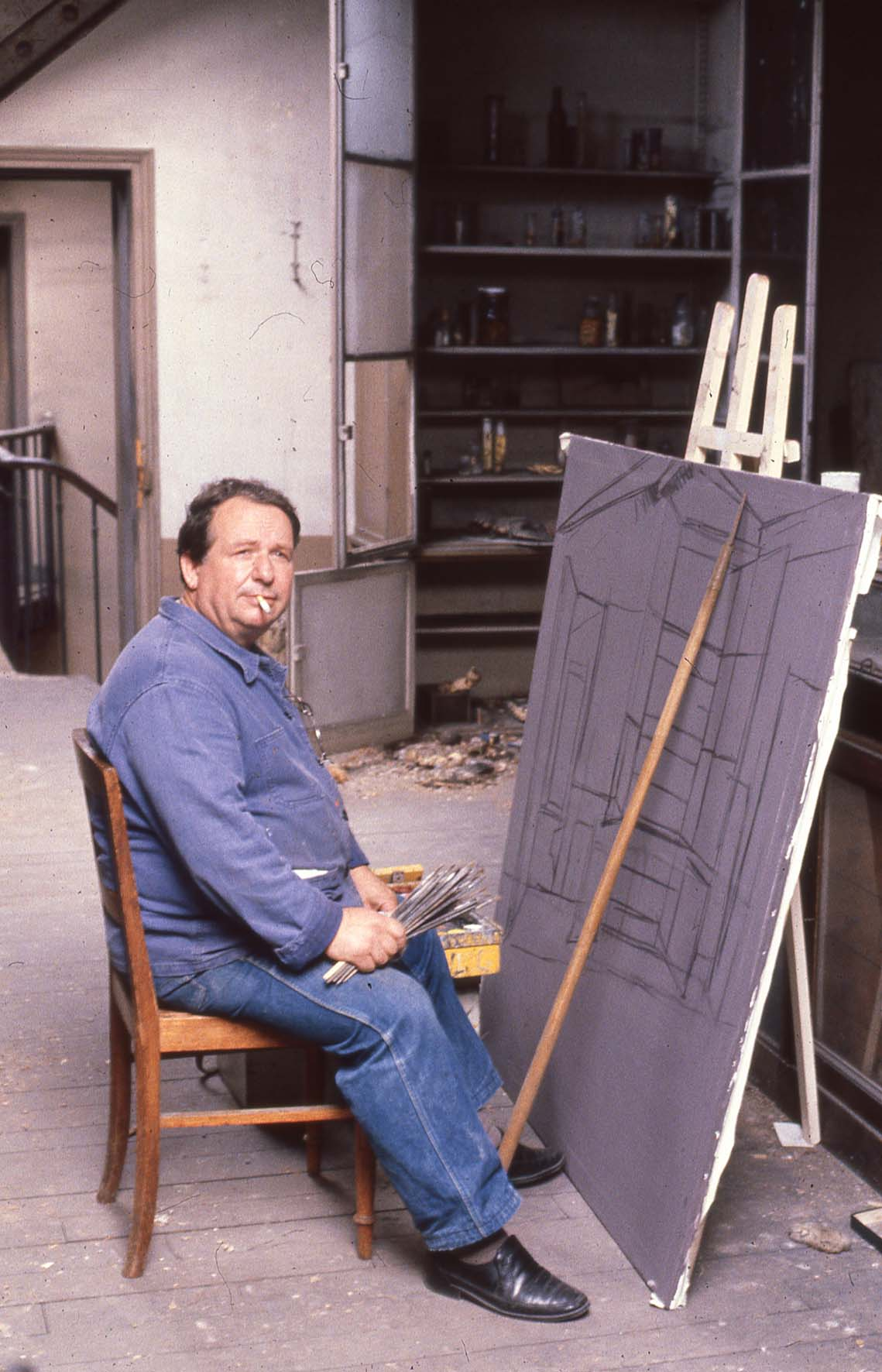
- Jürg Kreienbühl at the Muséum national d'Histoire naturelle in Paris
- Born: 12 August 1932; Basel, Switzerland
- Died: 30 October 2007 (aged 75); Cormeilles-en-Parisis, France
- Known for: Painting, printmaking
- Spouse: Suzanne Lopata
- Children: Stéphane Belzère

Jürg Kreienbühl (August 12, 1932 – October 30, 2007) was a Swiss and French painter.

== Life ==
Kreienbühl was born in Basel. After his high school graduation, he hesitated between pursuing scientific or artistic studies and finally completed an apprenticeship as a house painter in Basel. Earning a scholarship from his city, he traveled to Paris in 1956 to work and to make a living from his painting.

He first settled in Colombes where he painted rubbish tips, cemeteries and decomposing bodies of animals. Two years later, he ended up to move to the slum area of Bezons near Paris in an old wheelless bus. There he lived in difficult conditions among homeless, gypsies and North Africans who became his friends and models. Four years later, he left the slum to settle in an apartment near Argenteuil. The sales of some paintings enabled him to buy a "caravan-studio" and to keep on describing from nature, during more than a decade, the life in the slums and its population : social outcasts, prostitutes, vagrants and disabled people. In 1973, a retrospective exhibition of his work was held at Kunsthaus Museum in Aarau.

In the 1970s, Kreienbühl started to work on new subjects and to practice again etching and lithography that he could work in his home in Cormeilles-en-Parisis. In 1974, he made his first painting in the Jardin des plantes, “Hommage à Cuvier”. One year later, he found by accident a former factory of unsold terra cotta saints for churches in Vendeuvre-sur-Barse: he painted there a series a terra cotta figures lying on dusty grounds. He also spent a lot of time in Le Havre where he painted industrial pollution and the France liner which had to be demolished.

In 1982, Kreienbühl was invited to visit the Gallery of Zoology (now Gallery of Evolution) of the French National Museum of Natural History, in Paris. Because of disrepair reasons, the gallery was closed since 1965 and was no longer accessible to public. Fascinated by the damaged replica of animals and the scientific heritage of this place, he worked in the museum during three years where he realized about 60 paintings. Over the years, his subjects included the building site of La Défense, the park sculpture of Bernhard Luginbühl in Mötschwil, the nuclear power station in Gravelines and the port of Dunkirk, and the Warteck brewery in Basel. Over the last ten years of his life, Kreienbühl worked on the catalogue raisonné of his prints and on the monography Malerei der Leidenschaft, both published in 1998. Some important exhibitions were held at Musée de Gravelines (2011), Centre culturel Suisse in Paris (2001) and Centre d’art Jacques-Henri Lartigue in L’Isle-Adam (2006). After his death in 2007 in Cormeilles-en-Parisis, his work is being progressively rediscovered and joined the collection of the Centre Georges Pompidou and the Museum of Fine Arts of Rennes in 2017.

== Work ==
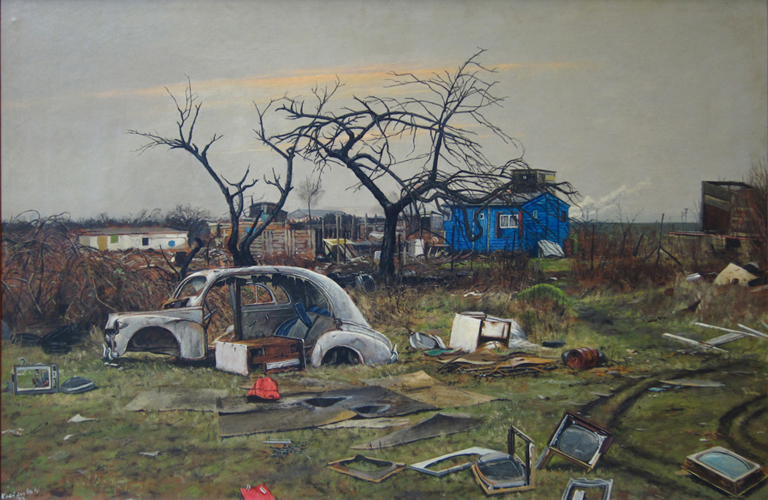
Jürg Kreienbühl, La zone, 1972, vinyl on masonite, 90 × 122 cm (private collection)

Although influenced at his beginnings by an expressionist manner like Lovis Corinth or Chaïm Soutine, his work turned quite quickly to an uncompromising realism. Willing to show the reality in the raw, he made himself the witness or the chronicler of the end times, by documenting the condemned worlds by the evolution of society : the old beliefs, the social outcasts and the life in the fringe and the ravages from urbanization and industrialization. According to Le Monde art critic Philippe Dagen, Jürg Kreienbühl "could be seen as the first photorealist of the Parisian painting in the 1960s. He can also be seen as the predecessor of those who make their art a disillusioned social and architectural chronicle".

His realist approach does not aim to reproduce strictly his natural environment but "to go beyond reality through the reality"as written by Leonard Ginsburg. His conception of realism has to be linked to his use of LSD in his youth, under the supervision of his friend Albert Hofmann who evoke it in his book "LSD - My Problem Child". Since this experiment, the visible world is for the painter the vehicle of another reality, hidden, omnipresent but invisible. That's why Albert Hoffman wrote about him that he was "both a painter and mystic".

== Exhibitions (selection) ==
- 1973: Jürg Kreienbühl, Aargauer Kunsthaus, Aarau
- 1985: Hommage à la galerie de Zoologie, Muséum national d'histoire naturelle, Paris
- 1992: Jürg Kreienbühl, Bilder, Zeichnungen, Druckgraphik, Kunstmuseum Basel
- 1998: Jürg Kreienbühl. L’œuvre gravé et lithographié 1952–1997, Musée du Dessin et de l’Estampe Originale, Gravelines
- 2001: Jürg Kreienbühl. Peintures, Centre Culturel Suisse, Paris
- 2006: Jürg Kreienbühl ou la réalité du monde, Centre d’art Jacques-Henri Lartigue, L’Isle-Adam
- 2014: Le Muséum d’Histoire Naturelle, Galerie Alain Blondel, Paris; Maurice et Boulon, Galerie Dix291, Paris
- 2015: Quelques êtres vivants dans leur environnement quotidien (with Gilles Aillaud), Galerie Gabrielle Maubrie, Paris
- 2018: Jürg Kreienbühl | Suzanne Lopata | Stéphane Belzère, Kunsthaus Interlaken

== Collections ==
Aargauer Kunsthaus, Aarau; Kunstmuseum, Basel, Kupferstichkabinett, Basel; Christoph Merian Stiftung, Basel; Musée des Beaux-Arts, Beauvais; Musée du Dessin et de l’Estampe Originale de Gravelines; Musée Louis Senlecq, L’Isle-Adam; Bibliothèque nationale, Paris; Centre Pompidou, Paris; Collection de la ville de Paris; FRAC Ile-de-France, Paris; Musée des Beaux-Arts, Rennes; Musée de l’Isle de France, Sceaux

== Publications ==
- Jürg Kreienbühl, text by Heiny Widmer, Aargauer Kunsthaus Aarau, 1973.
- Jürg Kreienbühl, text by Heiny Widmer, Galerie zem Specht Basel, 1982. ISBN 3-85696-005-8.
- Jürg Kreienbühl - Zeichnungen, Pastelle, Grafik, text by Beat Wismer, Aargauer Kunsthaus Aarau, 1985. ISBN 3-905004-01-1.
- Jürg Kreienbühl. Die wunderbare Welt der Zoologischen Galerie Paris, texts by Léonard Ginsburg, Aurel Schmidt, Jürg Kreienbühl and Carl Gans, Galerie zem Specht Basel, 1988. ISBN 3-85696-010-4.
- Jürg Kreienbühl, Bilder, Zeichnungen, Druckgraphik, introduction by Dieter Koepplin, text "Die Vision" by Jürg Kreienbühl, Kunstmuseum Basel, 1992 ISBN 3-7204-0077-8.
- Jürg Kreienbühl. Catalogue raisonné de l’oeuvre gravé et lithographié 1952–1997, texts by Jürg Kreienbühl, Dominique Tonneau-Ryckelynck, Peter Killer and Roland Plumart, Gravelines, 1997. ISBN 2-908566-08-7.
- Jürg Kreienbühl: Malerei der Leidenschaft / Peinture de la passion, texts by Christoph Stutz, Heiny Widmer, Georg K. Glaser, Carl Gans, Léonard Ginsburg, Rolf Hochhuth, Aurel Schmidt and Albert Hofmann, Basel, 1998. ISBN 3-7245-1013-6.
- Jürg Kreienbühl: Dessins-Pastels-Gouaches 1952–2003, preface by Jean-Michel Leniaud, Centre Culturel de l’Arsenal, Maubeuge, 2008. I ISBN 978-2-912473-26-4.

== Film ==
- Die sinkende Arche, directed and written by Bernhard Lehner and Konrad Wittwer, Filmagentur Look Now, Zürich, 1986.
