= Pierre Lamalattie =

French painter, novelist and art critic (born 1956)

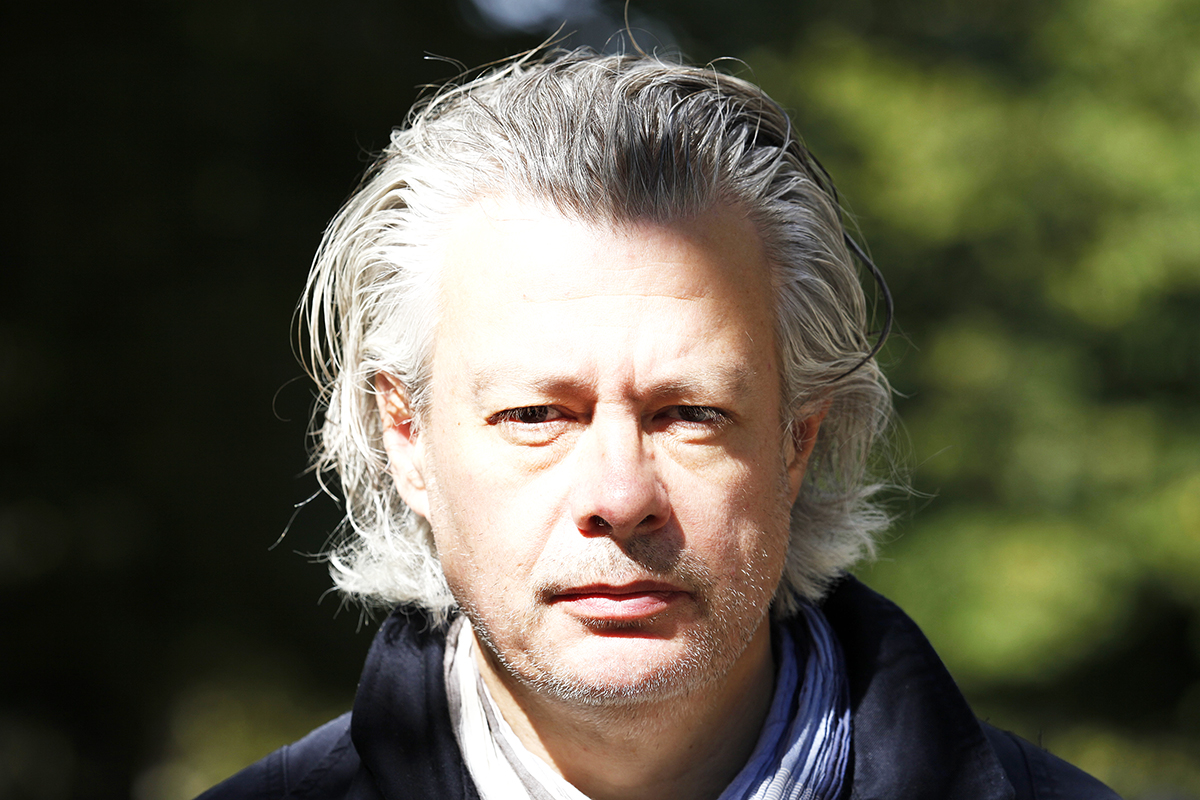
- Born: 1956 (age 69–70); Paris
- Known for: Painting
- Website: https://lamalattie.com

Pierre Lamalattie (born 1956 in Paris) is a French painter, novelist and art critic. He lives and works in Paris.

== Early life ==
Although he learnt painting from his grandmother Marguerite Juille and the artist Léo Lotz, he studied science. In 1975, he entered the Institut national agronomique Paris Grignon. He painted there regularly and created with some friends the review Karamazov in 1977. He graduated in 1980 with two specialities: political economy and ecology.

== Career ==
After one year in Algeria as a teacher, he began an engineering career at the Ministry of Agriculture, where he was in charge of an economic review. He became a mediator in industrial restructuring before teaching human resources and social issues at the Institut National Agronomique Paris-Grignon and at the Mines ParisTech.

In 1995, he began moving from engineering to painting and began to exhibit one year later. He focused on daily life of contemporaneous men and women (vicissitudes of sexuality, couples in crisis) and particularly, life at work. He is interested in the world of executives and in the weight of managerial speeches. In 2008, he began a series of imaginary portraits, dubbed “curriculum vitae”, mixing painting and inscriptions gthat point out a singularity or sum up a life in a few words.

He wrote his first novel in 2011, 121 curriculum vitae pour un tombeau, winning a prize at the Festival of The First Novel in Laval, and two years later, Précipitation en milieu acide. His literary texts are a continuation of his reflections about alienation at work.

Lamalattie contributes to magazines (Artension, Causeur, Écritique, etc.). His articles deal with periods of art history such as Caravaggisti and Academic art and art criticism.

== Solo exhibitions (selection) ==
- 1996: Galerie Sylvie Guimiot, Paris
- 1997: Galerie Elian Lizart, Brussxels
- 1999: Galerie de Passy, Paris
- 2003: Centre culturel St-Honoré, Paris
- 2004: Siège de la Société Générale, Paris
- 2006: Galerie Serpentine, Paris
- 2007: Galerie Jamault, Paris. Galerie Art actuel, Paris
- 2008: Socles et cimaises, Nancy
- 2009: Chapelle Saint-Libéral, Brive
- 2011: Peindre des vies toutes entières, galerie Alain Blondel, Paris
- 2014: Galerie Alain Blondel, Paris

== Collective exhibitions ==
- 1997, 1998: May Salon, Paris
- 2005, 2008 and 2009: Nude Art, Paris
- 2007, 2008 and 2009: MAC 2000, Paris
- 2009 : Artscènes / Galerie FHM, Boulogne
- 2010: Copart, Révigny-sur-Ornain
- 2016 : « Still life – Style of life », Jean-Marie Oger, Paris

== See also ==
=== Bibliography ===
- 121 curriculum vitae peints par Pierre Lamalattie, preface by Françoise Monnin, Martin Media, 2010.
- Portraits, L'Éditeur, 2011

=== Novels ===
- 121 curriculum vitae pour un tombeau, L’éditeur, Paris, 2011.
- Précipitation en milieu acide, L’éditeur, Paris, 2013.

=== External links ===
- Official website
