= Francine Van Hove =

French painter (1942–2025)

- Born: Francine Van Nieuwenhove; 5 May 1942; Saint-Mandé, France
- Died: 5 August 2025 (aged 83)

Francine Van Hove (5 May 1942 – 5 August 2025) was a French contemporary painter.

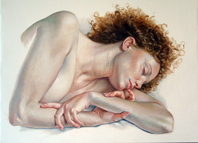
La Dormeuse

== Life and career ==
Born in Saint-Mandé (Seine, France), Van Hove studied in Paris and received a Fine Arts degree with qualifications to teach in secondary schools. After teaching one year at Lycee de Jeunes Filles in Strasbourg, she resigned from her position and decided to come back to Paris in 1964 where she lived and continued to paint.

She was known for her paintings of young women with dreaming attitudes. Her graphic and pictorial techniques are reminiscent of Italian Renaissance painters and Flemish painters of the 16th and 17th centuries. Her work counts more than 400 paintings, all privately owned, as well as numerous drawings and pastels.

In 2014, Alain Blondel, her historic art dealer, retired after having promoted her work for 32 years. From then on, Van Hove was represented by Jean-Marie Oger, former assistant at galerie Alain Blondel.

Van Hove died on 5 August 2025, at the age of 83.

== Main exhibitions ==
- 2000: Villa Beatrix Enea, Anglet
- 2000: Pavilion of Antiques and Fine Arts
- 2001: Alain Blondel Gallery, Paris
- 2003: Alain Blondel Gallery, Paris
- 2005: Alain Blondel Gallery, Paris
- 2007: Alain Blondel Gallery, Paris
- 2009: Alain Blondel Gallery, Paris
- 2010: Bellefeuille Gallery, Montreal
- 2011: Alain Blondel Gallery, Paris
- 2012: Alain Blondel Gallery, Paris
- 2012: Arts Elysees, Paris
- 2014: Alain Blondel Gallery, Paris
- 2016: The Prince's Eye Gallery, Paris
- 2016: Still Life - Style of Life, Jean-Marie Oger Gallery, Paris
- 2016: Bellefeuille Gallery, Montreal
- 2019: Florilège, Galerie JR in collaboration with Jean-Marie Oger, Arles
- 2021: On the side of home, Galerie Jean-Marie Oger, Paris
- 2023: Drawings & Paintings, Galerie Jean-Marie Oger, Paris

== Family ==
- Bernar, born Bernard Boulitreau,(1957–2006) cartoonist at Charlie Hebdo, her brother
- Paul Boulitreau French painter born in 1967, her nephew
