= Stéphane Belzère =

Franco-Swiss painter

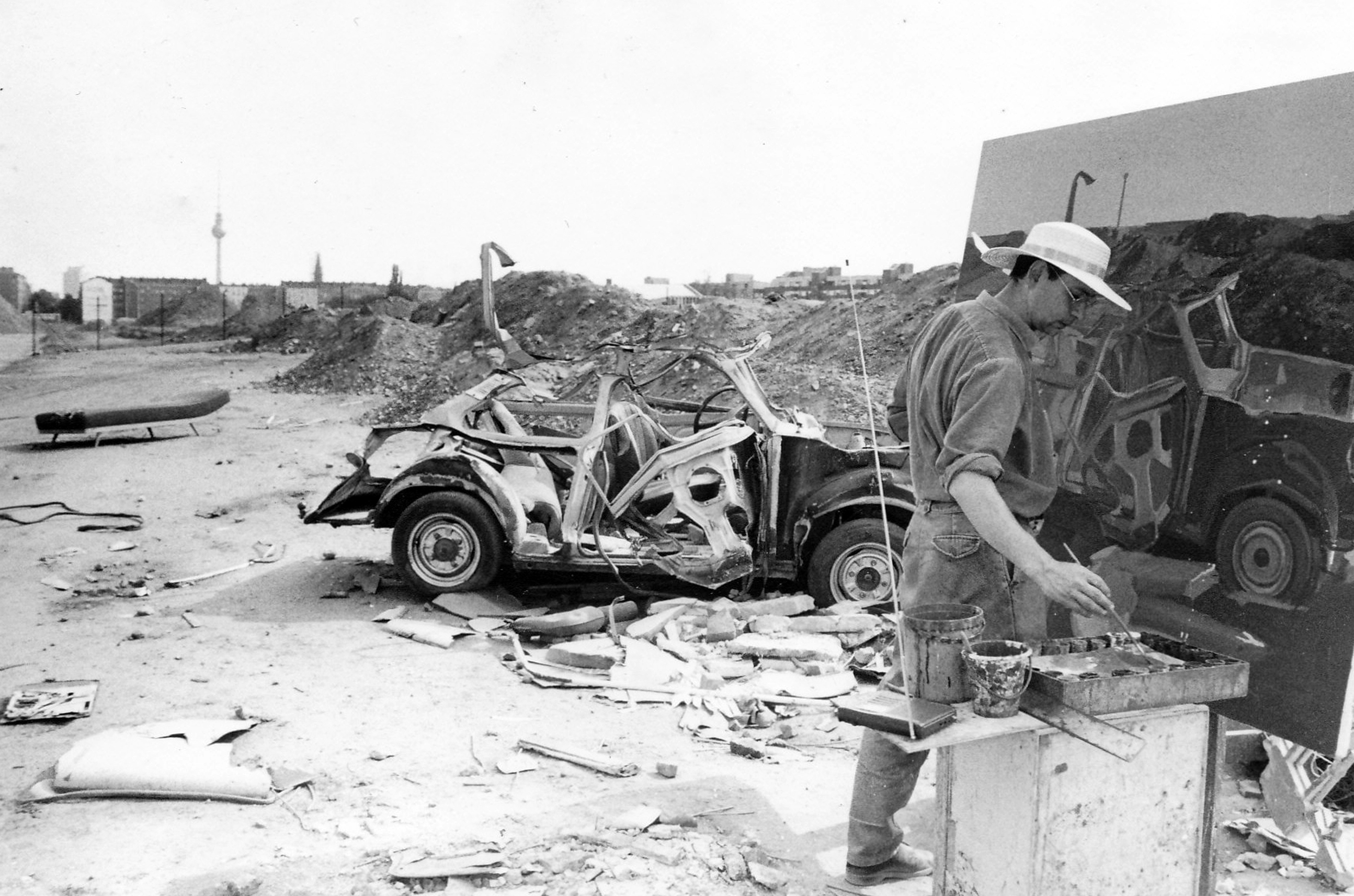
- Stéphane Belzère painting in Berlin
- Born: Stéphane Kreienbühl; 6 November 1963 (age 62); Argenteuil
- Education: Beaux-Arts de Paris
- Known for: Artist
- Parent(s): Jürg Kreienbühl, Suzanne Lopata

Stéphane Kreienbühl, known as Stéphane Belzère (born 6 November 1963) is a Franco-Swiss painter. He lives and works between Paris and Basel.

== Biography ==
=== Early life ===
Kreienbühl was born in 1963 in Argenteuil (France). Son of the painters Jürg Kreienbühl and Suzanne Lopata, he spent the first five years of his life in Switzerland where he was raised by his paternal grandparents before returning to Cormeilles-en-Parisis to live with his parents.

=== Education ===
During his studies at the Beaux-Arts de Paris, from which he graduated in 1990, he assisted his parents in various tasks, such as preparing their painting supports or organizing their exhibitions. Influenced by the realism of his father, he first painted there from nature the collection of antique plasters from the art school that were broken by students in 1968 and put away since then in the cellars.

=== Works ===
From 1991 to 1994, he stayed regularly in Berlin where he depicted the urban landscape and the marks of recent history in the city after the fall of the wall: tunnels between East and West Berlin, dilapidated buildings, backyards...

In 1995, he returned to the National Museum of Natural History in Paris where he had accompanied his father a few years earlier. He paints directly in the "Soft Pieces" room of the Museum the brains and genital organs of animals preserved in formalin jars. He developed this theme of flesh in another series, the "Tableaux-saucisses" : "by painting from jars of food and organs that served as models, I sort of gave myself up to exploring the feeling of attraction/repulsion, the limits of the notions of beauty and ugliness. I thus amassed a collection of jars containing food, by making countless visits to food stores and supermarkets, while at the same time, I painted the jars of the so-called "soft pieces" collection gathered in the comparative anatomy section of the National Museum of Natural History. The visibility of flesh, whether for consumption or for scientific use, fascinated me".

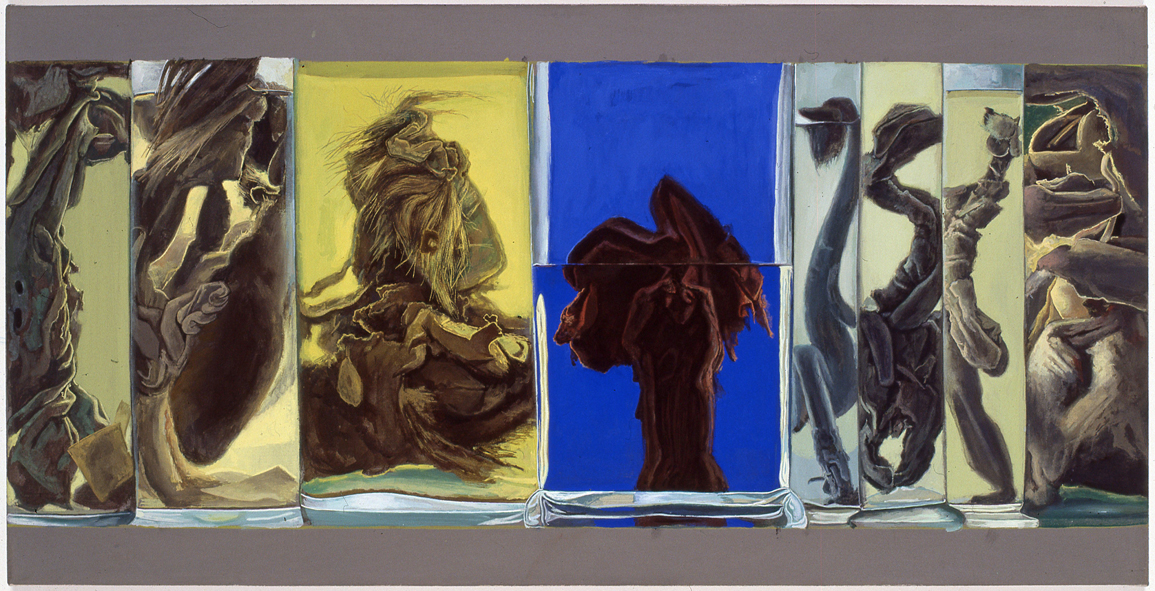
Bocaux Anatomiques n°32, vinyl on canvas, 50 x 100 cm.

His interest in transparency led him to the "Long paintings" series by observing the sediments in the bottom of anatomical preparation jars. Enhanced by the magnifying effect of glasses, these strata of disintegrated materials evoke glacial and interior landscapes, between figuration and abstraction.

From 1995 to 2013, in his studio in Berlin, he produced a series of small-format paintings, called "Nocturnal Reflections", that ended with the number 700 the day of his fiftieth birthday. Like a sort of diary, he painted his nocturnal full-length portrait, often naked, in the reflection of his studio window.

In 2003, he was chosen the winner of the competition launched by the Ministry of Culture (France) for designing the stained glass windows of the Rodez Cathedral. Completed in 2007 in collaboration with Ateliers Duchemin, his work is based on the idea of the flow of light and life that penetrates all the chapels, introduces a dynamic and a fluidity that symbolize life and its perpetual renewal. He tried to renew the image of God and Saints in a more contemporary and understandable language, by adding more abstract elements in religious iconography, such as the reproduction of an Magnetic Resonance Imaging, the diagram of the nervous system or of the blood network to symbolize the divine thought and represent the immaterial.

At the same time, he also created installations, called "Chemical stained glass", by arranging on shelves some bottles of cleaning products whose transparencies and colors are highlighted by the play of lights.

Between the end of 2007 and the beginning of 2008, he had three simultaneous shows in public institutions at the Cantonal Museum of Zoology in Lausanne, the Musée Denys-Puech in Rodez and at the Chapelle Saint-Jacques in Saint-Gaudens. In 2013, the Art museum of Pully showed his "Long paintings" after he was awarded the FMES prize of the Sandoz Family Foundation in 2011. In 2021, the Strasbourg Museum of Modern and Contemporary Art (MAMCS) invited him to occupy a room in the museum for a year and a half; this exhibition entitled "Floating Worlds" is thought as a dialogue between his paintings, including an installation specially designed for the occasion and the collection of the Musée zoologique de la ville de Strasbourg.

Between figuration and abstraction, his work offers a reflection on the preservation of flesh, the representation of the body, the brain and the memory. Stéphane Belzère deals with his topics by focusing on the relationship between form and shape, on reflections, variations of light, transparency and color.

== Exhibitions ==
=== Solo exhibitions (selection) ===
- 2021–2023: Mondes flottants, Strasbourg Museum of Modern and Contemporary Art
- 2018: Szenographie einer Familie – Werke von Stéphane Belzère, Psychiatrie Museum, Bern
- 2015: Pensées colorées, Hommage au peintre Jürg Kreienbühl, Galerie Franz Mäder, Basel
- 2013: Nachtspiegelungen-Reflets nocturnes, Lage Egal Raum für aktuelle Kunst, Berlin
- 2013: Le projet des tableaux longs – Prix Fems, Musée de Pully, Lausanne
- 2013: Œuvres sur papier, Centre d’art, Cesson-Sévigné
- 2011: Vagues, tourbillon et autres turbulences, Galerie Nicolas Silin, Paris
- 2010: Überblick, Galerie Mäder, Basel
- 2010: Radboud University Medical Center, Nijmegen
- 2009: Portraits de famille, etc..., Galerie RX, Paris
- 2008: Reflets nocturnes, Centre d'art contemporain Chapelle Saint-Jacques, Saint-Gaudens
- 2008: Peintures etc..., Musée Denys-Puech, Rodez
- 2007: Peintures en bocal/bocal de peinture, Cantonal Museum of Zoology, Lausanne
- 2006: Peintures d’après nature, Centre d’art, Épinal
- 2005: Vitrail chimique et peintures récentes, Galerie RX, Paris
- 2003: Conserves peintes – Eingemachtes, Café au lit, Paris
- 2003: Le Fruit de la rencontre – Histoires de bocal, Musée Raymond Lafage, Lisle-sur-Tarn
- 1998: Alles ist Wurst – Tout est saucisse, Association Fantom e.V., Berlin
- 1997: Tout est saucisse – Alles ist Wurst, Galerie Art & Patrimoine, Paris

=== Group exhibitions (selection) ===
- 2022: De l’Onirique à la lumière, Château de Taurines
- 2022: Stéphane Belzère, Diaquarelles – Elisa Haberer, photographies, La nouvelle galerie, Cologne
- 2022: Memento Espace départemental d’art contemporain, Auch
- 2020: Pop-Up Artistes, Fondation Fernet-Branca, Saint-Louis
- 2020: Vitraux d’artistes, de Notre-Dame de Paris à l’abbaye royale de Fontevraud, Fontevraud Abbey
- 2018: Vitrail contemporain, Couvent de la Tourette, Évreux
- 2018: Jürg Kreienbühl, Suzanne Lopata, Stéphane Belzère, Kunsthaus Interlaken
- 2015: L'art dans tous ses états, Oeuvres de la collection du FRAC Ile-de-France, Les Réservoirs, Limay
- 2015: Le vitrail contemporain, Cité de l'Architecture et du Patrimoine, Paris
- 2014: Frisch gemalt, Museum Bruder Klaus, Sachseln
- 2012: Memento mori, carte blanche à Karim Gahdab, L’H du Siège – Centre d'art contemporain, Valenciennes
- 2011: Veilleurs de nuit, centre d’art de Tanlay, Château de Tanlay
- 2011: La lune en parachute, 20 ans, Centre d’art, Épinal
- 2010: CARNE, Le 104, Paris
- 2010: Artistes dans la ville, Musée d'art et d'histoire de Saint-Lô
- 2009: Open studios, Christoph Merian Stiftung, Basel
- 2009: Animalia, Musée Barrois, Bar-le-Duc
- 2009: Stéphane Belzère invite...Marc Desgrandchamps, Sylvie Fajfrowska, Régine Kolle, François Mendras, Anne Neukamp, Françoise Pétrovitch, Renaud Regnery, Philippe Segond, Xiao Fan, Galerie RX, Paris
- 2009: Eaux d’ici, Eaux de là, Chamalot-Résidence d’artistes
- 2008: On line, Centre d'art contemporain, Saint-Restitut
- 2008: Nourritures, corps et âme, Abbaye Saint-Germain/Centre d’art de l’Yonne, Auxerre
- 2007: L’Invitation au bocal, Frédérique Lucien-Stéphane Belzère, Galerie municipale Jean-Collet, Vitry
- 2007: Artificialia 3, MABA – Maison d’Art Bernard Anthonioz, Nogent-sur-Marne
- 2006: À taille humaine, ArtSénat, Paris
- 2006: Quintessence, École supérieure des Beaux-Arts de Nîmes
- 2005: Artificialia 2, Musée Barrois, Bar-le-Duc
- 2005: L'inquiétante étrangeté des objets, Oeuvres du FRAC Ile-de-France, Musée Gatien-Bonnet, Lagny-sur-Marne
- 2005: Lumières contemporaines, Centre international du Vitrail, Chartres
- 2004: De leur Temps, MUba Eugène-Leroy, Tourcoing
- 2002: L’art d’être bête, l’animal dans l’art de Goya à nos jours, École d'Art Claude Monet, Aulnay-sous-Bois
- 2001: L'Autoportrait contemporain, Musée de Menton
- 1996: Die Kraft der Bilder, Martin-Gropius-Bau, Berlin

== Awards ==
- 2011: FEMS Prize, Sandoz Family Foundation, Pully
- 1997: Paul Louis Weiler Prize, Institut de France
- 1997: Coprim Foundation Contemporary Art Prize
- 1990: Aumale Prize, prix Alphonse Cellier Painting Prize, Institut de France
- 1986: Fondation Princesse Grace Prize, Monaco

== Commissions ==
- 2018: Realization of paintings for the maternity ward of Hôpital Mignot in Versailles
- 2017: Realization of a new diorama after Louis Daguerre, Museum of Cormeilles-en-Parisis
- 2016: Mural paintings for the technical high school Leon Blum in Villefranche-de-Lauragais
- 2003–2007: Design and realization of stained-glass windows for the Rodez Cathedral
- 1987: Realization of a diorama after Louis Daguerre for the bicentenary of his birth, Cormeilles-en-Parisis

== Collections ==
- Kunstmuseum Basel
- FRAC Île-de-France
- Strasbourg Museum of Modern and Contemporary Art
- Musée de Boulogne-Billancourt
- Fondation d'art contemporain Daniel et Florence Guerlain
- Fondation Colas
- Sandoz Family Foundation
- Christoph Merian Stiftung
- Collection Weber Bank
- Kunstcollectie Radboud University Medical Center

== Bibliography ==
- Vitraux d’artistes, de Notre-Dame de Paris à l’abbaye royale de Fontevraud, 2020
- Szenographie einer Familie-Werke von Stéphane Belzère Psychiatrie Museum Bern, 2018
- Architecture et art sacré de 1945 à nos jours, Archibooks, 2015 (ISBN 978-2-35733-343-7)
- Le vitrail contemporain, Editions Cité de l’architecture et du patrimoine/Lineart, 2015 (ISBN 978-2-35906-134-5)
- Tableaux longs – prix Fems, texts by François Landolt, Delphine Rivier, Nicolas Raboud, Jacques-Michel Pittier and Stéphane Belzère, Éditions Fondation Edouard et Maurice Sandoz, 2013
- Tandem 17, Guy Reid- Stéphane, Belzère, Éditions Croix Baragnon, 2015
- The French Connection : Kunstcollectie UMC St Radboud in Museum Het Valkhof, 2012 (ISBN 978-90-74241-00-7)
- Caring for art, UMC ST Radboud, Nijmegen, 2011 (ISBN 978-90-74241-15-1)
- Les artistes dans la ville, Musée des Beaux-Arts, Saint-Lô, 2010
- La Cathédrale de Rodez, les vitraux de Stéphane Belzère, texts by Dominique Paillarse, Michel Tassier, Bellino Ghirard, Philippe Piguet and Gilles Rousvoal, Éditions du patrimoine/Itinérances, 2008 (ISBN 978-2-7577-0028-0)
- Peintures etc..., texts by Jens Emil Sennewald, Roland Kaehr, Emmanuelle Ryser, Sophie Serra, Christine Blanchet-Vaque, Eric Darragon, Karim Ghaddab, Valérie Mazouin, Éditions du Rouergue, Rodez (ISBN 978-2-84156-896-3)
- A taille humaine, artsénat 2006 (ISBN 2-35276-022-4)
- Lumières contemporaines, vitraux du XXIème siècle et architecture sacrée, Centre international du vitrail, Éditions Gaud, Chartes (ISBN 2-84080-137-X)
- De leur Temps-Collections privées Françaises, Musée des Beaux-Arts de Tourcoing/ADIAF (ISBN 2-901440-22-3)
- Histoires de bocal, entretiens avec Eric Darragon, Le Rouergue/Actes, Rodez/Arles, 2003 (ISBN 2-84156-533-5)
