= Alessandro Papetti =

Italian painter (born 1958)

- Born: 1958 (age 67–68); Milan, Italy
- Education: self taught
- Known for: Painting

Alessandro Papetti (born 1958 in Milan) is an Italian painter.

== Career and works ==
Since being featured in the 2003 Venice Biennale, Papetti emerged as one of the most important Italian painters today. Since 1995 he has been dividing his time between Milan and Paris.

Papetti is a self-taught artist. His most noticeable influences include Francis Bacon and Alberto Giacometti, and his most recognizable body of work is focused on industrial archaeology, portraits and studies of nudes, frequently painted from a high-angle perspective.

He has been exhibiting since 1980. Recent museum exhibitions include the Galleria Comunale d’Arte in Cesena, Italy, and the Musei Civici di Villa Manzoni in Lecco, Italy. An exhibition of Papetti's work entitled “Moscow. Factories of Utopia” was held in Shchusev State Museum of Architecture in Moscow in 2012. The exhibition was inspired by images of the Soviet industrial era.

In 2014 Papetti participated in the exhibition Doppio sogno, curated by Luca Beatrice and Arnaldo Colasanti, held in Palazzo Chiablese in Turin. The same year he also opened a show at the Palazzo della Penna of Perugia, entitled La pelle attraveso and curated by Luca Beatrice.

== Commentary ==
In 1995 Papetti met the writer and biographer James Lord who wrote a significant critical essay on his work. James Lord wrote the following about Papetti: “The first, and perhaps the most illuminating thing to be said about the art of Alessandro Papetti is that it is profoundly Italian. No artist of course ever successfully conceals his national, traditional and psychological origins, though some are more prone to do so than others. One thinks of Van Gogh. But not Papetti. It is not his subject matter that evokes the homeland. In this he is truly international, and entirely his own era despite seeming reminiscences of styles of the past. These are resemblances only. What is Italian about Papetti is his masterly self-effacement in confrontation with the subject matter. As a person he never gets in the way of what the artist is doing. The art is there, and he is the innocent perpetrator of what his hand instructs him to do, he sees, to be sure, what he is doing, but when he is working none of what he sees is visible to the spectator. We see the art. He sees the creation. In this symbiosis dwells the joy – that is, the truth – of aesthetic gratification."
