= Pierre Marcel-Béronneau =

French Symbolist painter (1869–1937)

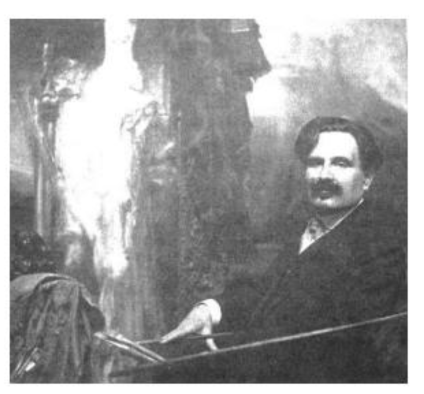
- Marcel-Béronneau in his studio
- Born: 1869; Bordeaux, France
- Died: 1937 (aged 67–68); La Seyne-sur-Mer, France
- Education: École des Beaux-Arts de Bordeaux; École nationale supérieure des Beaux-Arts
- Occupation: Painter
- Movement: Symbolism

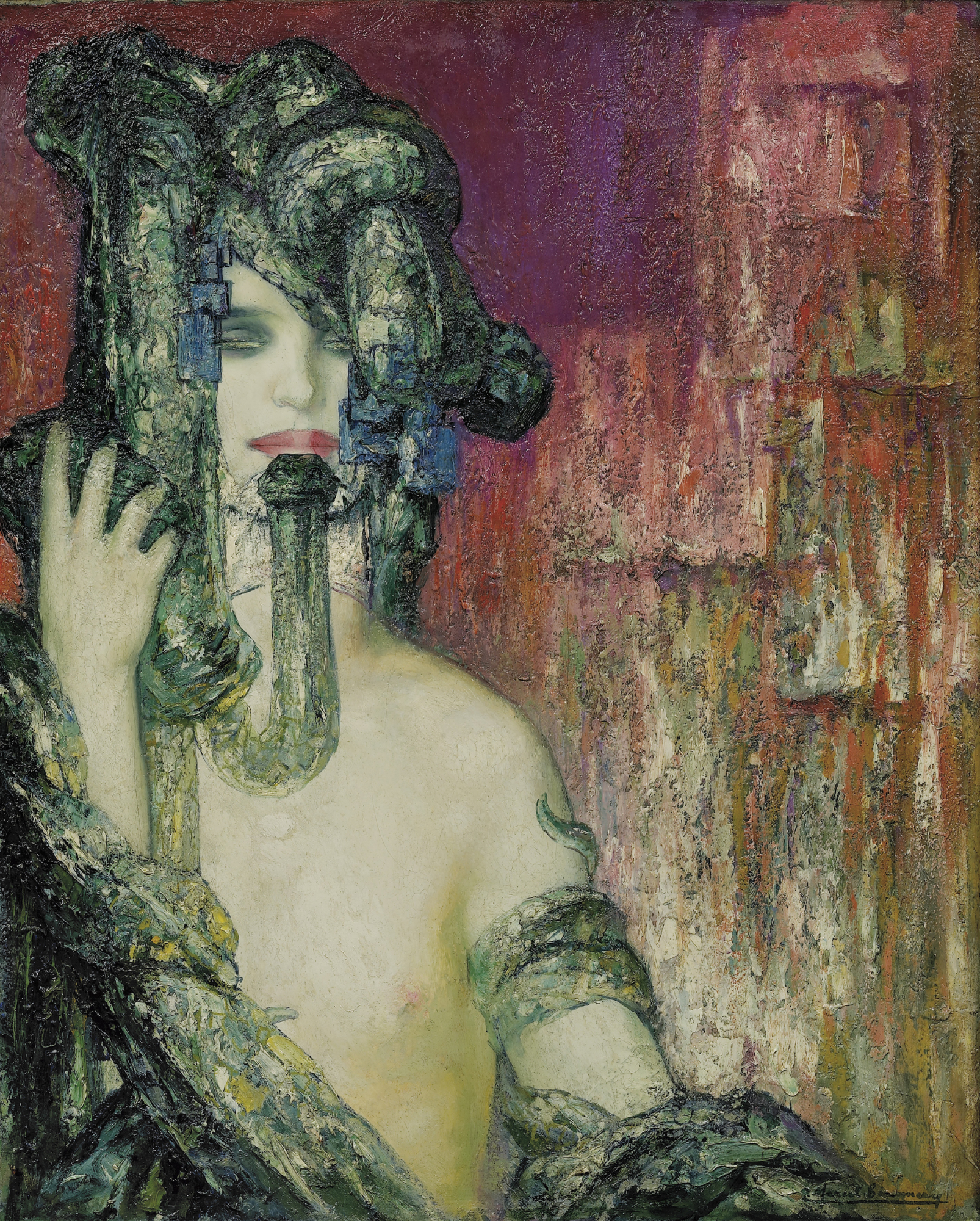
Gorgone

Pierre Amédée Marcel-Béronneau (1869–1937) was a French Symbolist painter. He first worked at the École des Beaux-Arts de Bordeaux at the same time as Fernand Sabatté then became "one of the most brilliant students" of Gustave Moreau at the École nationale supérieure des Beaux-Arts. He was a member of the Société des Artistes Français.

In early February 1909, Kahlil Gibran had been working for a few weeks in Béronneau's studio in Paris; he used "his sympathy towards Béronneau as an excuse to leave the Académie Julian altogether". According to Robin Waterfield, "Gibran was confirmed in his aspiration to be a Symbolist painter" after working in Marcel-Béronneau's studio.
