= Sergio Ceccotti =

Italian painter (born 1935)

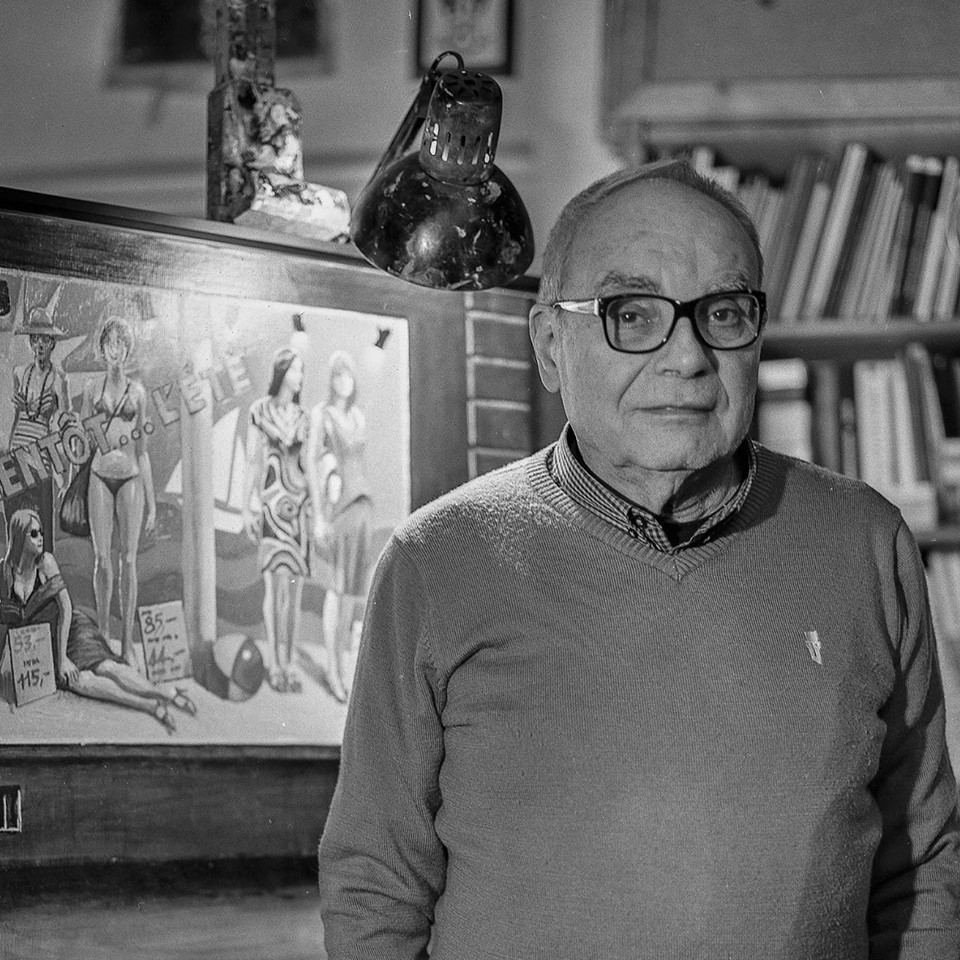
Sergio Ceccotti

Sergio Ceccotti (born 1935 in Rome) is an Italian painter. He lives and works in Rome.

== Biography ==
He first studied at the Internationale Sommerakademie für Bildende Kunst in Salzburg under the direction of Oskar Kokoschka and attended then the drawing courses of the French Academy in Rome from 1956 to 1961.

In the 1950s and early 1960s, Sergio Ceccotti's work shows influence of cubism, of Giorgio de Chirico to whom he was compared, and, above all, of the German Expressionism. He felt very close to the Masters of the New Objectivity and engaged an intellectual correspondence with some of them, like Otto Dix, Conrad Felixmüller and Ludwig Meidner.

At the beginning of the 1960s, the influence of film noir movies and comic strips turn his painting into a more narrative style. The use of the code of film noir makes the real uncertain and the reading of comic enables him to add numerous objects in the minimum space to get more intensity. From that date, his paintings were regularly shown in Italian and French galleries as well as museums in Europe.

His etchings were published in limited edition books of French and Italian poets like Jacques Baron, Georges-Emmanuel Clancier, Jean-Pierre Biondi and Giorgio Vigolo. He has also illustrated books and made front covers for the surrealist writer Philippe Soupault who wrote a text on his painting in 1980, "L'Insolite quotidien". The portrait that Sergio Ceccotti made of the writer was shown in the exhibition, "Philippe Soupault, le surréalisme et quelques amis" at the Musée du Montparnasse in 2007.

Sergio Ceccotti's painting reflects paradoxes and fears of contemporary metropolis with his global visions of based on heterogeneous elements: fotonovela, Alfred Hitchcock films, mass media, roman noir and contemporary novels, art history and breaking news. His art reveals a metaphysical, sociological and almost mysterious vision of daily life.

In 2014, the Villa Torlonia, Rome museum devoted a retrospective exhibition to him, showing more than eighty paintings from 1958 to 2014 in the pavilion of the Casino dei Principi. In 2018, the Palazzo delle Esposizioni celebrates the sixty years of activity of the painter by hosting the exhibition “Sergio Ceccotti. Il romanzo della pittura 1958-2018” curated by Cesare Biasini Selvaggi.

In 2025 at the occasion of his 90th birthday, LuoghInteriori published his "Catalogo generale dei dipinti" that includes all his paintings from 1958 to 2025.

== Solo exhibitions (selection) ==
- 1977: galerie Liliane François, Paris
- 1979: galerie Liliane François, Paris
- 1985: galerie Jan de Maere, Bruxelles
- 1987: Galleria Comunale d'Arte Contemporanea, Arezzo
- 1988: galerie Jan de Maere & Ozenne, Paris
- 1990: galerie Alain Blondel, Paris
- 1992: galerie Alain Blondel, Paris
- 1993: Upplands Konstmuseum, Uppsala
- 2000: La Musique du temps, galerie Alain Blondel, Paris
- 2003: Cloître des Cordeliers, Tarascon
- 2004: Galleria d'Arte Moderna e Contemporanea, Anticoli Corrado
- 2006: Roman parisien, galerie Alain Blondel, Paris
- 2009: Soupçon, galerie Alain Blondel, Paris. Galeria Tondinelli, Rome
- 2010: Las Colores de la vida, Centro Cultural Borges, Buenos Aires
- 2013: Histoires sans histoire, galerie Alain Blondel, Paris
- 2014: La vita enigmistica, Musei di Villa Torlonia – Casino dei Principe, Rome. Capolinea 19 La Stellina Arte Contemporanea, Rome. Lumières. Dolci malinconie, Galleria Elle Arte, Palerme
- 2018: Sergio Ceccotti. Il romanzo della pittura 1958-2018, Palazzo delle Esposizioni, Rome
- 2024: Sergio Ceccotti. Temps de mystères, Galerie Jean-Marie Oger, Paris

== Collective exhibitions (selection) ==
- 1971–1975: Salon de la jeune peinture, Paris
- 1974: Le Mythe de la Société Moderne vue à travers la machine, galerie la Passerelle Saint-Louis, Paris
- 1979: Ville Matrice, Ville Matricule, galerie Pierre Lescot, Paris
- 1983: Tel peintre, Quels maîtres ?, galerie ABCD, Paris
- 1985: L’Italie d’aujourd’hui – Italia oggi, CNAC Villa Arson, Nice
- 1988: Signes, schémas, images, Acropolis, Nice. Reality, Artemis gallery, Bruxelles
- 1989: Regards sur la Révolution française, galerie Liliane François, Paris
- 1990: Collection Liliane François, Centre d’arts plastiques, Royan
- 1997: Philippe Soupault, l’inconnu, l’amour, la poésie, Bibliothèque Nationale, Paris
- 2003: Futuro Italiano, Parlement Européen, Bruxelles. Geografie del mistero. Metafisica, dada, surrealismo, Il Narciso, galleria d´arte contemporanea, Rome. Cuore Selvaggio, galleria Annovi, Sassuolo
- 2005: Pittori figurativi italiani nella seconda metà del XX secolo, Fondo Mole Vanvitelliana, Ancona
- 2006: Sinfonia urbana – Echi dalla città, Il Narciso, galleria d´arte contemporanea, Rome
- 2007: Philippe Soupault, le surréalisme et quelques amis, Musée de Montparnasse, Paris
- 2008: Love, Palazzo Ducale, Genoa
- 2011: Ah, che rebus – Cinque secoli di enigma fra arte e gioco in Italia, Istituto Nazionale per la Grafica, Rome
- 2012: 54. Biennale di Venezia, Padiglione Italia, Regione Lazio, Museo Nazionale del Palazzo di Venezia, Rome
- 2016: Still life – Style of life, Jean-Marie Oger, Paris

== Public and private collections (selection) ==
Galleria Nazionale d'Arte Moderna, Rome; Vatican Museums, Modern Religious Art collection; Galleria d’Arte Moderna, Bologna; Galleria Comunale d’Arte Contemporanea, Arezzo; Pinacoteca “C. Barbella”, Chieti; Civica Pinacoteca, San Gimignano; Galleria Civica d’Arte Moderna, Santhià; Museo del Pattinaggio, Finale Emilia; Bibliothèque Nationale, Paris; Bibliothèque Littéraire Jacques Doucet, Paris; Staatliches Museum Lindenau, Altenburg; Museo Renato Guttuso, Bagheria; Banca d’Italia, Rome; Banca Nazionale del Lavoro, Rome; La Compagnie Financière Edmond de Rothschild, Paris; Bulgari, Rome; Provincia Regionale di Palermo; Università degli studi di Palermo, polo museale.

== See also ==
=== Bibliography ===
- Sergio Ceccotti – L’Insolite quotidien, preface by Philippe Soupault, Valori Plastici, Rome, 1980.
- Sergio Ceccotti: opere recenti, texts by Maurizio Fagiolo dell'Arco, Galleria il Narciso, Rome, 1983.
- Sergio Ceccotti, text by Patrick Roegiers, Éditions Galerie Jan de Maere, Brussels, 1987.
- Ceccotti, Editions Ramsay, Coll. Vision, Paris, 1992.
- Sergio Ceccotti, texts by Edward Lucie-Smith, Edition Lachenal-Ritter, Paris, 2001. ISBN 978-2-904388-52-1
- Sergio Ceccotti – Catalogo generale dell'opera grafica, texts by Cesare Biasini Selvaggi and Stefano Liberati, Unione Europea Esperti d'Arte, 2002.
- Sergio Ceccotti, texts by Cesare Biasini Selvaggi, Carlo Cambi editore, 2014. ISBN 978-88-6403-183-5
- Sergio Ceccotti - Il romanzo della pittura 1958 >2018, texts by Cesare Biasini Selvaggi, Carlo Cambi editore, 2018. ISBN 978-88-6403-296-2
- Sergio Ceccotti. Catalogo generale dei dipinti, texts by Stefano Liberati, Giovanni Argan and Julie Borgeaud, LuoghInteriori, 2025. ISBN 978-8868645922

=== External links ===
- Official site
- Jean-Marie Oger Gallery
