= Ray Richardson (artist) =

British painter (born 1964)

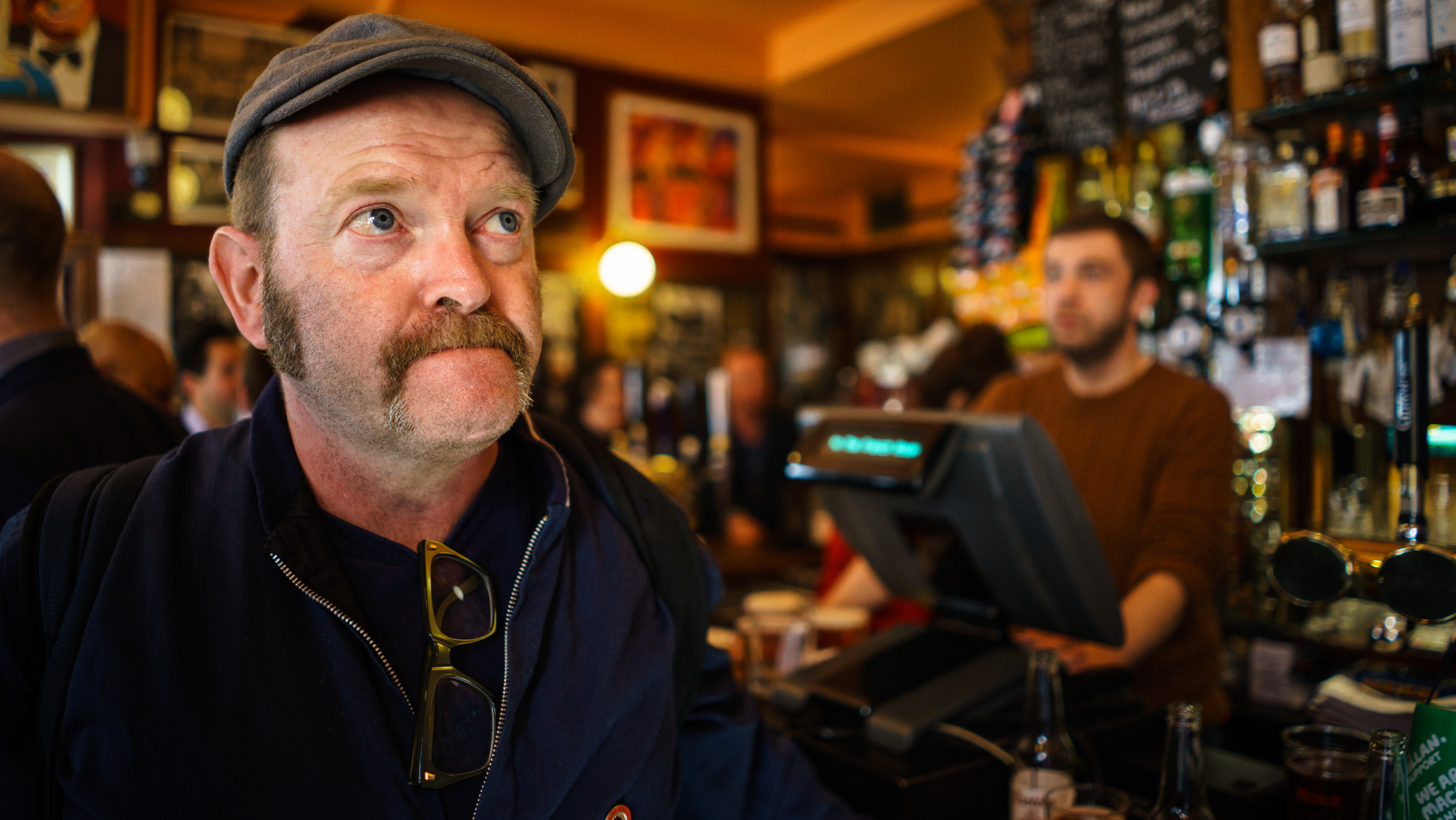
- Richardson in 2017.
- Born: 1964 (age 61–62); London
- Education: Saint Martin's School of Art; Goldsmiths College
- Known for: Painting
- Awards: British Council Award; BP Portrait Award

Ray Richardson (born 1964) is a British painter. He lives and works in London.

== Biography ==
Richardson spent his childhood in the Woolwich Dockyard area. He graduated from Saint Martin's School of Art (1983–1984) and Goldsmiths College (1984–1987), he won his first British Council Award in 1989 and the BP Portrait Award in 1990. At the same time, he began a long collaboration with three galleries: Boycott Gallery in Brussels, Galerie Alain Blondel in Paris and Beaux Arts gallery in London. Since 2016, he collaborates with the Zedes Art Gallery in Brussels.

Richardson paints observations of his world of working class southeast London. In 1993, the Telegraph Magazine commissioned him paintings and drawings of the world heavyweight champion boxer Lennox Lewis which were then offered by the magazine to and accepted by the National Portrait Gallery.

Over time, he has depicted not only everyday scenes in southeast London but a larger social panorama, mixing criticism, humour and personal concerns. Richardson uses his very emblematic English Bull Terrier as a metaphor or double in his narration which takes places in urban or coastal landscapes, caravans and football fields.

Both filled with pictorial tradition (Titian, Goya, Hogarth, Hopper) and contemporary cultures (soul music, photography), his works are characterised by a formal closeness with cinema. Interested in Film noir movies amongst other genres of film, he tries "to combine the traditional stuff of painting with the cinematic ways of looking at things". Because of his subjects and the transposition of filmmaker techniques (close-up, horizontal formats, use of shadow to create drama), he has been dubbed by Lindsay MacCrae (GQ magazine) as the "Martin Scorsese of figurative painting", and Iain Gale (The Independent) stated: "There is a filmic quality in these works which proposes Ray Richardson as a David Lynch of canvas and paint."

In 2014–2015, two of his works are part of Reality: Modern and contemporary British painting, an exhibition about the most influential painters from the last sixty years at the Sainsbury Centre for Visual Arts and the Walker Art Gallery, alongside Francis Bacon, Ken Currie, Lucian Freud, David Hockney, Paula Rego, George Shaw, Walter Sickert, Stanley Spencer, etc.

In 2017, the young Belgian director, Nina Degraeve, dedicated a short documentary entitled "Our side of the water" to Richardson.

== Selected solo exhibitions ==
- 1989: The Cat In The Hat, Boycott Gallery, Brussels
- 1992: The Odd Man Out, Galerie Alain Blondel, Paris
- 1994: Oostenders, Beaux Arts Gallery, London
- 1996: One Man On A Trip, Beaux Arts Gallery, London. The Luckiest Man In Two Shoes, Galerie Alain Blondel, Paris
- 1999: MFSB, Beaux Arts Gallery, London
- 2001: Out Of Town, Boycott Gallery, Brussels
- 2004: Storyville, Advanced Graphics, London
- 2005: An English Phenomenon, Mendenhall Sobieski Gallery, Los Angeles. Lazy Sunday, Gallagher and Turner, Newcastle upon Tyne
- 2009: Music For Pleasure, Galerie Alain Blondel, Paris. With A Little Pinch Of London, Advanced Graphics, London
- 2012: Everything is everything, Beaux-Arts, London.
- 2014: The Jack Lord, Ben Oakley Gallery, London
- 2016: London Soul, Beaux-Arts, London
- 2016 : You caught me smilin' again, Zedes Art Gallery, Brussels

== Selected group shows ==
- 1988: The John Player Portrait Award, National Portrait Gallery, London
- 1990: BP Portrait Award, National Portrait Gallery, London
- 1993: RA Summer Show, Royal Academy, London
- 1998: The Morecambe And Wise Show (with Mark Hampson), Glasgow Print Studio
- 1999: OKUK (with Mark Hampson), Gallery Aoyama & Laforet Museum, Tokyo
- 2002: England Away (Mark Hampson), Gallery Aoyama & Laforet Museum, Tokyo
- 2012: BP Portrait Award, National Portrait Gallery, London; Never Promised Poundland (with Cathie Pilkington and Mark Hampson), No Format Gallery, London
- 2014: REALITY: Modern and Contemporary British Painting, Sainsbury’s Centre for Visual Arts, Norwich
- 2015: REALITY: Modern and Contemporary British Painting, Walker Art Gallery, Liverpool; Linolcut (with Picasso, Peter Blake, Sol LeWitt, Wayne Thiebaud and Gary Hume), Paul Stolper Gallery, London
- 2016: Still life – Style of life, Jean-Marie Oger, Paris

== Awards ==
- 1989: British Council Award
- 1990: BP Portrait Award Commendation
- 1999: British Council Award
- 2002: British Council Award
- 2007: Association of Painter Printmakers A.R.E.
- 2012: Artist in Residence Eton College. Founders Painting Prize ING Discerning Eye

== Bibliography and media ==
- Ray Richardson – One Man On A Trip, texts by Edward Lucie-Smith and Iain Gale, Beaux Arts Gallery, London, 1996.
- Oil on canvas, 30-minutes documentary, BBC2, 1999 & 1997.
- Fresh, LWT, 1998.
- Sampled, Channel 4, 1998.
- Ray Richardson – Storyville, interview with Hanif Kureishi, Advanced Graphics London, 2004.
- Reflections, film by Ray Richardson and Glen Maxwell with Deptford Albany, 2004.
- From the Artist’s Studio, BBC Radio 3, 2005.
- Ray Richardson – Everything is Everything, text by Jake Auerbach, Beaux Arts Gallery, London, 2012.
- Ray Richardson : Our side of the water, Nina Degraeve, Belgium, 2017.
