= Ray Richardson (footballer) =

English footballer

Personal information
- Date of birth: 9 September 1959 (age 67)
- Place of birth: London, England

Senior career*
Years	Team	Apps	(Gls)
1982–1986	Heracles		
1986	AZ		
1986–1989	Cambuur		
1989–1990	Heerenveen		
1990–1993	RKC Waalwijk		
- * Club domestic league appearances and goals

Ray Richardson (born 9 September 1959) is an English former professional footballer. Born in London, he played in the Netherlands for Heracles, AZ, Cambuur, Heerenveen and RKC Waalwijk.
