= Rodolfo Ceccotti =

Rodolfo Ceccotti (born 8 February 1945 in Florence, Italy) is an Italian painter and printmaker. After teaching in Carrara, he became a lecturer in Printmaking Techniques at the Fine Art Academy in Florence. Since 1996, he has also been Director of Studies at the Scuola Internazionale per la Grafica d'Arte Il Bisonte in Florence.

Self-taught, he has devoted himself to painting since he was a boy; decisive was the friendship with the poets Gatto, and Gherardini Betocchi, Fiorentino Capocchini, Vignozzi, Caponi, Scatizzi and Tirinnanzi was instrumental. However, his ideal teachers have always been Constable Turner, Borrani, Sernesi, Fattori, Monet and Friedrich.

== 1970s ==
In his early 20s, he won a scholarship for young artists awarded by the Florence City Council. In 1971, 1973 and 1977, he was invited to the Florin exhibitions. He held his first personal exhibition at the gallery ‘Inquadrature’ in 1974. In 1974, he designed the windows for the Church of San Silvestro in Tobbiana di Prato. After 1975, he began to hold personal exhibitions in numerous Italian cities until, in 1979, he received a prestigious invitation to an ontological exhibition at the Olivetti Cultural Centre in Ivrea. A number of national and international collectives followed.

By this time the themes of his work had already developed: landscaper with open skies, trees and isolated farmhouses. In 1979, Carlo Ludovico Ragghianti put him in charge of the drawing course at the International Art University in Florence.

== 1980s ==
In 1984, he was among the five artists chosen by Leonardo Sciascia for the exhibition ‘Artists and Writers’ held at the Rotonda della Besana in Milan. He was invited to hold a personal exhibition at the gallery ‘La Tavolozza’ in Palermo.

A turning point for his work was his trip to Sicily in 1986, after which his watercolour and oil paintings presented skies with vivid colours above deserted spaces. The works of this period were exhibited in two personal exhibitions at the gallery Pananti (Florence) in 1987 and at ‘La Tavolozza’ (Palermo) in 1988.

Among the most prestigious printmaking exhibitions are the following: "The Image of the Sign 1940-1990" at Villa Renatico Martini in Monsummano Terme (Pistoia); "Ten Years of Acquisitions 1984-1990" at the ‘Gabinetto Disegni e Stampe’ in the Uffizi; "Signs of Tuscany" in Chianciano; "Firenze 4th of November 1966, Thirty Years Later" at the Gallery ‘Il Bisonte’, Firenze; "III Etching Biennal" at Rotary Club of Acqui Terme, Ovada; "XIV International Biella Prize".

== 1990s ==
In 1990 he held a one-man show in Piombino, and in 1991, he exhibited a number of his works together with those of Piero Vignozzi at the Fortezza Doria in Portovenere.

In 1994, Tommaso Paloscia listed him in the Mondadori Catalogue of Graphic Art.

In 1997, he made eight etchings for the poetry volume "Mentira" by Dedy Luziani, Il Bisonte Editions. In 1998, the Gallery ‘Il Bisonte’ hosted an ontological exhibition of his work as painter and printmaker. In 1999, he participated in a collective exhibition of the artists linked with ‘Il Bisonte’ in Tokyo at the Edogawa-Ku Center and the Yamagata Cultural Center. In 2000, his work ‘Nuvole attraverso i rami’ won the second edition of the Prize Leonardo Sciascia amateur d’estampes. It was consequently entered in the Achille Bertarelli Civic Collection of Prints in the Palazzo Sforzesco in Milan.
