= Beaux-Arts de Paris =

National school of fine arts in France

- École nationale supérieure des beaux-arts
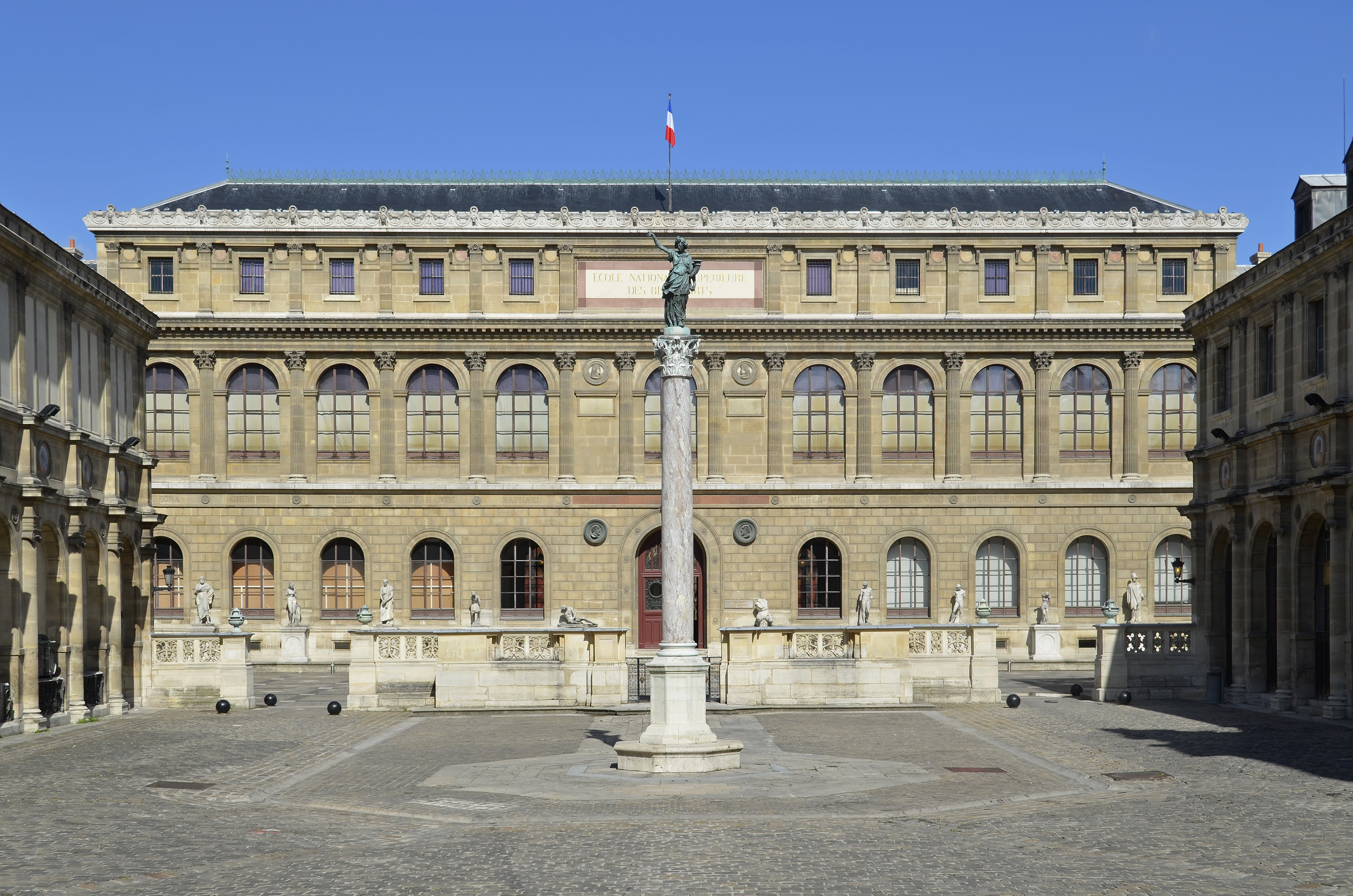
- Type: Grande école
- Established: 1817; 209 years ago
- Affiliations: CGE, Paris Sciences et Lettres University
- Director: Éric de Chassey
- Location: Paris, France; 48°51′25″N 02°20′00″E
- Campus: 6th arrondissement of Paris
- Website: www.beauxartsparis.fr
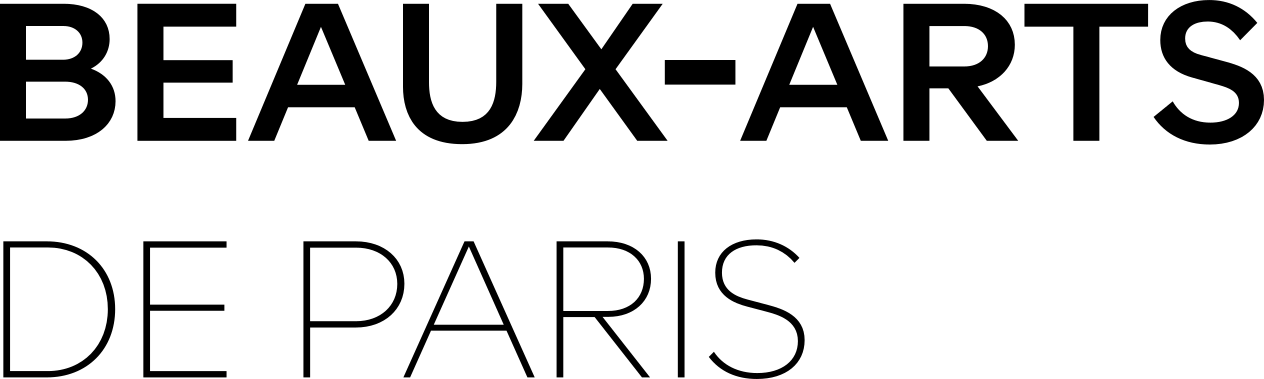

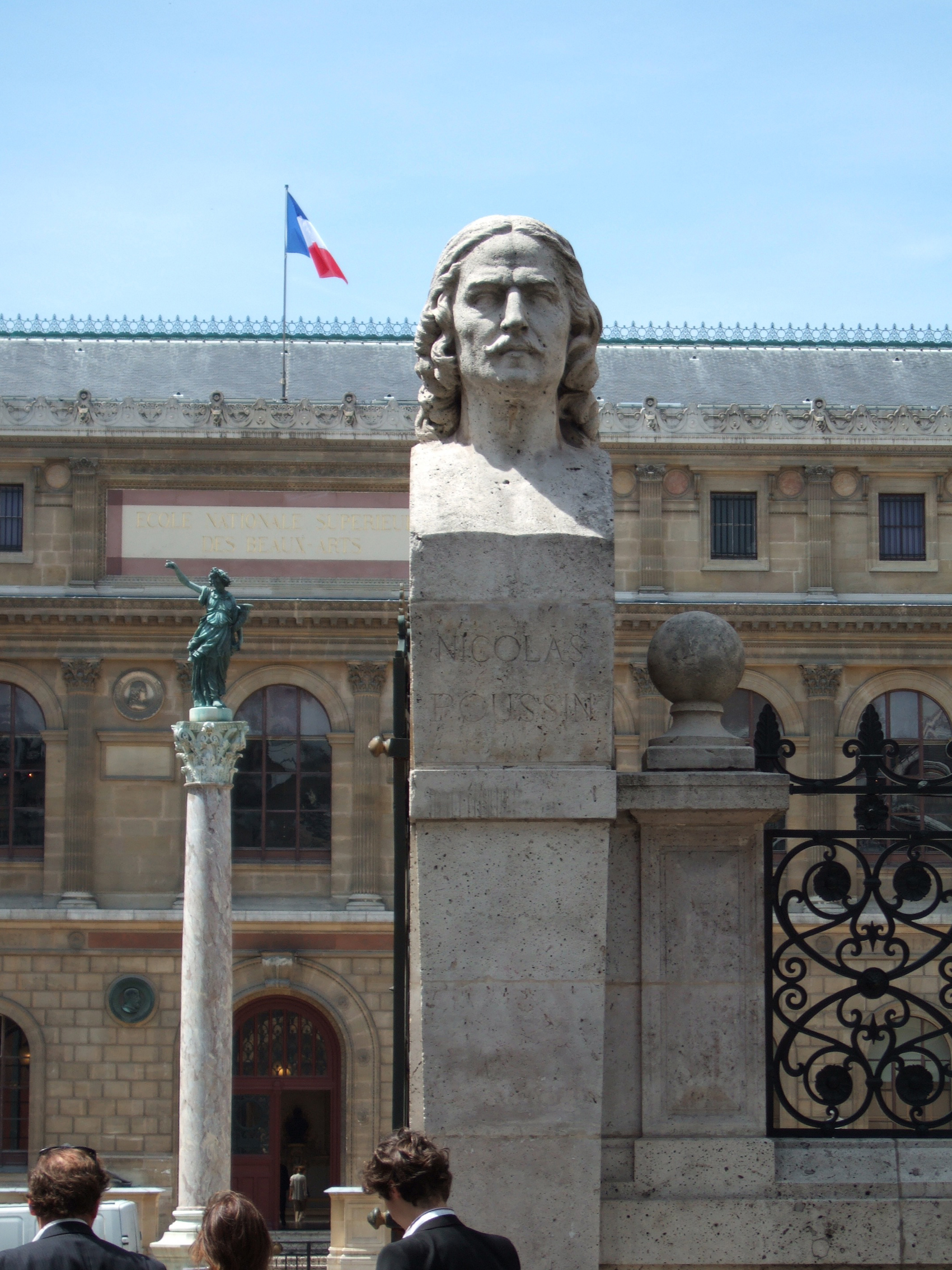
The entrance of the Beaux-Arts de Paris with a bust of Nicolas Poussin

Plan of the site

The Beaux-Arts de Paris (French: [boz‿aʁ də pari]), formally the École nationale supérieure des beaux-arts (French: [ekɔl nɑsjɔnal sypeʁjœʁ de boz‿aʁ]), is a French grande école whose primary mission is to provide high-level fine arts education and training. The art school, which is part of the Paris Sciences et Lettres University, is located on two sites: Saint-Germain-des-Prés in Paris, and Saint-Ouen.

The Parisian institution is made up of a complex of buildings located at 14 rue Bonaparte, between the quai Malaquais and the rue Bonaparte. This is in the heart of Saint-Germain-des-Prés, just across the Seine from the Louvre museum. The school was founded in 1648 by Charles Le Brun as the famed French academy Académie royale de peinture et de sculpture. In 1793, at the height of the French Revolution, the institutes were suppressed. However, in 1817, following the Bourbon Restoration, it was revived under a changed name after merging with the Académie d'architecture. Held under the King's tutelage until 1863, an imperial decree on November 13, 1863 named the school's director, who serves for a five-year term. Long supervised by the Ministry of Public Instruction, the École des Beaux-Arts is now a public establishment under the Ministry of Culture.

== History ==
The Beaux-Arts de Paris is the original of a series of Écoles des beaux-arts in French regional centers. Since its founding in 1648, the Académie royale de peinture et de sculpture has had a school, France's elite institution of instruction in the arts. Its program was structured around a series of anonymous competitions that culminated in the grand prix de l'Académie Royale, more familiar as the Grand Prix de Rome, for its winner was awarded a bourse and a place at the French Academy in Rome. During his stay in Rome, a pensionnaire was expected to send regular envois of his developing work back to Paris. Contestants for the Prix were assigned a theme from the literature of classical antiquity; their individual identities were kept secret to avoid any scandal of favoritism.

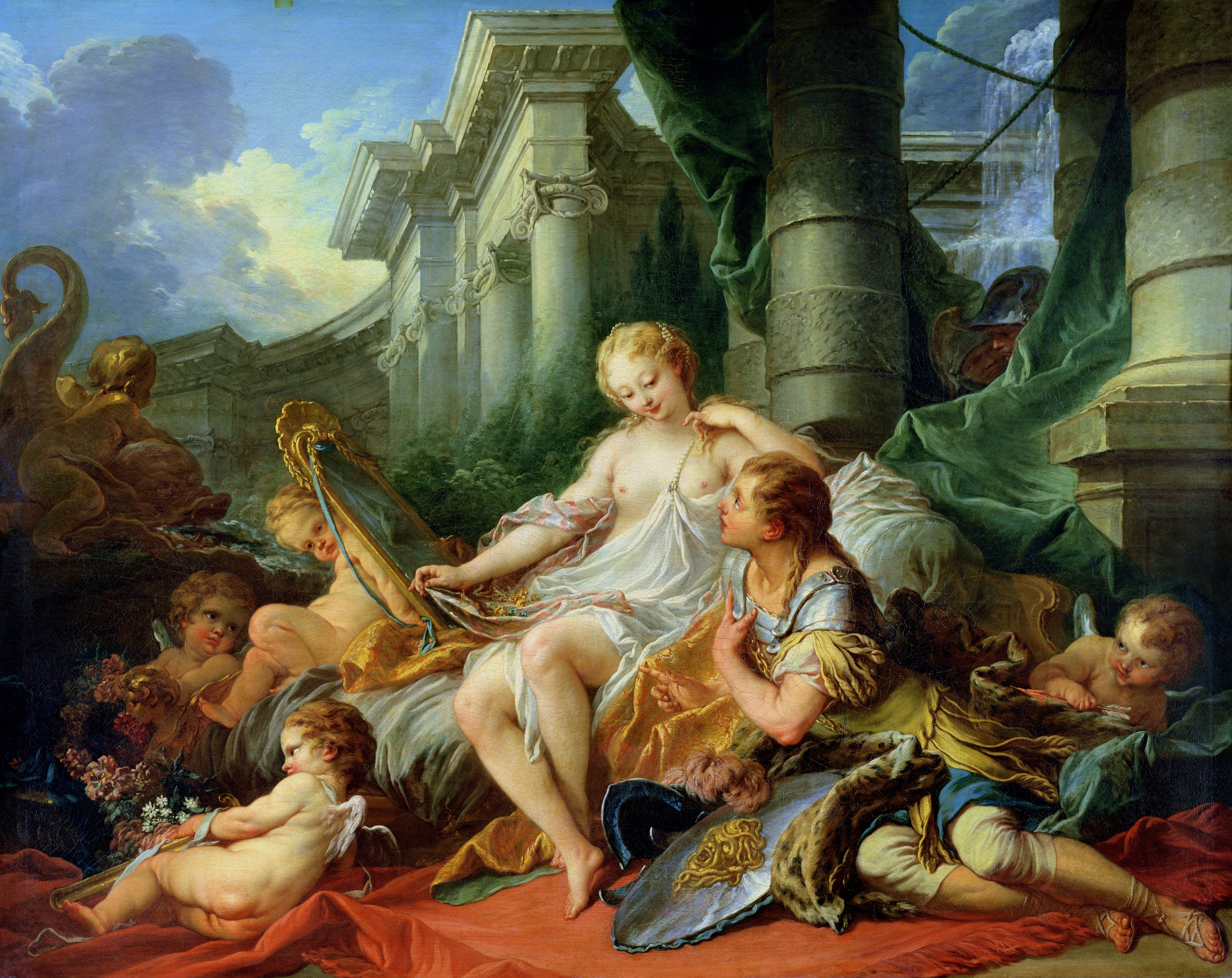
Rinaldo and Armida, François Boucher's morceau de réception, gained his admission to the Académie royale in 1734.

With his final admission into the Académie, the new member had to present his fellow academicians a morceau de réception, a painting or sculpture that demonstrated his learning, intelligence, and proficiency in his art. Jacques-Louis David's Andromache Mourning Hector was his reception offering in 1783; today it is in the collections of the Louvre Museum.

In 1793, during the French Revolution, the Académie Royale and the grand prix de l'Académie Royale were abolished, but only a few years later, in 1797, the Prix de Rome was re-established. Each year throughout the nineteenth century, the winner of the Prix de Rome was granted five years of study at the Villa Medici, after which the painter or sculptor could fully expect to embark on a successful official career.

The program resulted in the accumulation of some great collections at the Académie, one of the finest collections of French drawings, many of them sent as envoies from Rome, as well as the paintings and sculptures, usually the winners, of the competitions, or salons. Lesser competitions, known as the petits concours, took themes like history composition (which resulted in many sketches illustrating instructive moments from antiquity), expressions of the emotions, and full and half-figure painting.

In its role as a teaching institution, the École assembled a large collection of Italian and French etchings and engravings, dating from the 16th through the 18th century. Such prints published the composition of paintings to a wide audience. The print collection was first made available to students outside the Académie in 1864.

Today, studies include: painting, installation, graphic arts, photography, sculpture, digital media and video. Beaux-Arts de Paris provides the highest level of training in contemporary art production. Throughout history, many world-renowned artists have either taught or studied at this institution. The faculty is made up of recognized international artists. Theoretical courses permitting diverse approaches to the history of the arts complement studio work, which is supported by technical training and access to technical bases. The media center provides students with rich documentation on art, and organizes conferences, seminars, and debates throughout the year. The School buildings have architectural interest and house prestigious historical collections and an extensive fine arts library. The school publishes a dozen texts per year on different collections, and holds exhibitions ranging from the school's collection of old-master drawings to the most up to date contemporary works, in the Quai Malaquais space and the Chapel throughout the year.

== Collections ==
The school owns circa 450,000 items divided between artworks and historical books, making it one of the largest public art collections in France. The collection encompasses many types of artistic productions, from painting and sculpture to etching, furniture or decorated books and from all the periods of art history. Many pieces of the collection are artworks created by students of the School throughout its history but former students and scholars also contributed to enlarge the holdings with many gifts and donations to the institution. The collection consists in approximatively 2,000 paintings (including pictures by Nicolas Poussin, Anthony van Dyck, Hyacinthe Rigaud, Jean-Honoré Fragonard, Hubert Robert and Ingres), 600 pieces of decorative arts, 600 architectural elements, nearly 15,000 medals, 3,700 sculptures, 20,000 drawings including works by Paolo Veronese, Primaticcio, Jacques Bellange, Michelangelo, Charles Le Brun, Nicolas Poussin, Claude Gellée, Dürer, Rembrandt, Ingres, François Boucher or Pierre Alechinsky, 45,000 architectural drawings, 100,000 etchings and engravings, 70,000 photographs (mainly form the period 1850–1914), 65,000 books dating from the 15th to the 20th century (3,500 for the 15th and 16th centuries), and 1,000 handwritten pieces of archive (letters, inventories, notes...) and also 390 important fragments or complete illuminated manuscripts.

== Campus ==
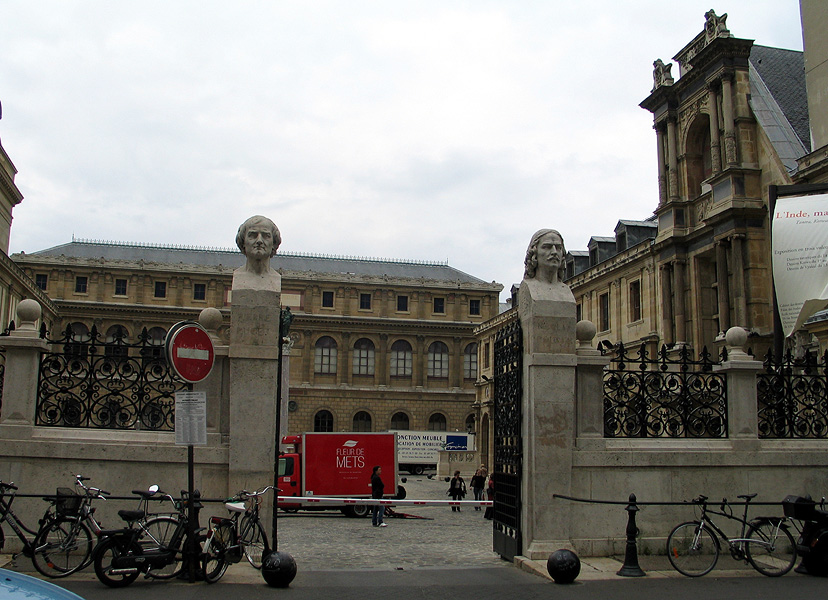
Entrance at 14 Rue Bonaparte

The physical setting of the school stands on about two hectares in the Saint-Germain-des-Prés section of Paris. The main entrance at 14 Rue Bonaparte is flanked by colossal carved heads of Pierre Paul Puget and Nicolas Poussin (done in 1838 by Michel-Louis Victor Mercier).

Before 1816, Beaux-Arts students were taught elsewhere. This land had been the convent of the Petits Augustins, then the site of Alexandre Lenoir's collection of architectural fragments from across France, the Musée des Monuments français (1795–1816), assembled here as a result of the destruction of churches and noble chateaux during the revolution.

In 1830, architect Félix Duban, a former student and winner of the Grand Prix de Rome, began a transformation of the site by demolishing a few existing houses, moving back the convent's cloister on the right to produce a symmetrical courtyard, and designing the largest central building, the Palais des Études. Duban simply incorporated many of Lenoir's historical fragments, notably the portal of the 1548 Château d'Anet, and in the courtyard a facade from the Château de Gaillon, since removed and returned to its original site in 1977.

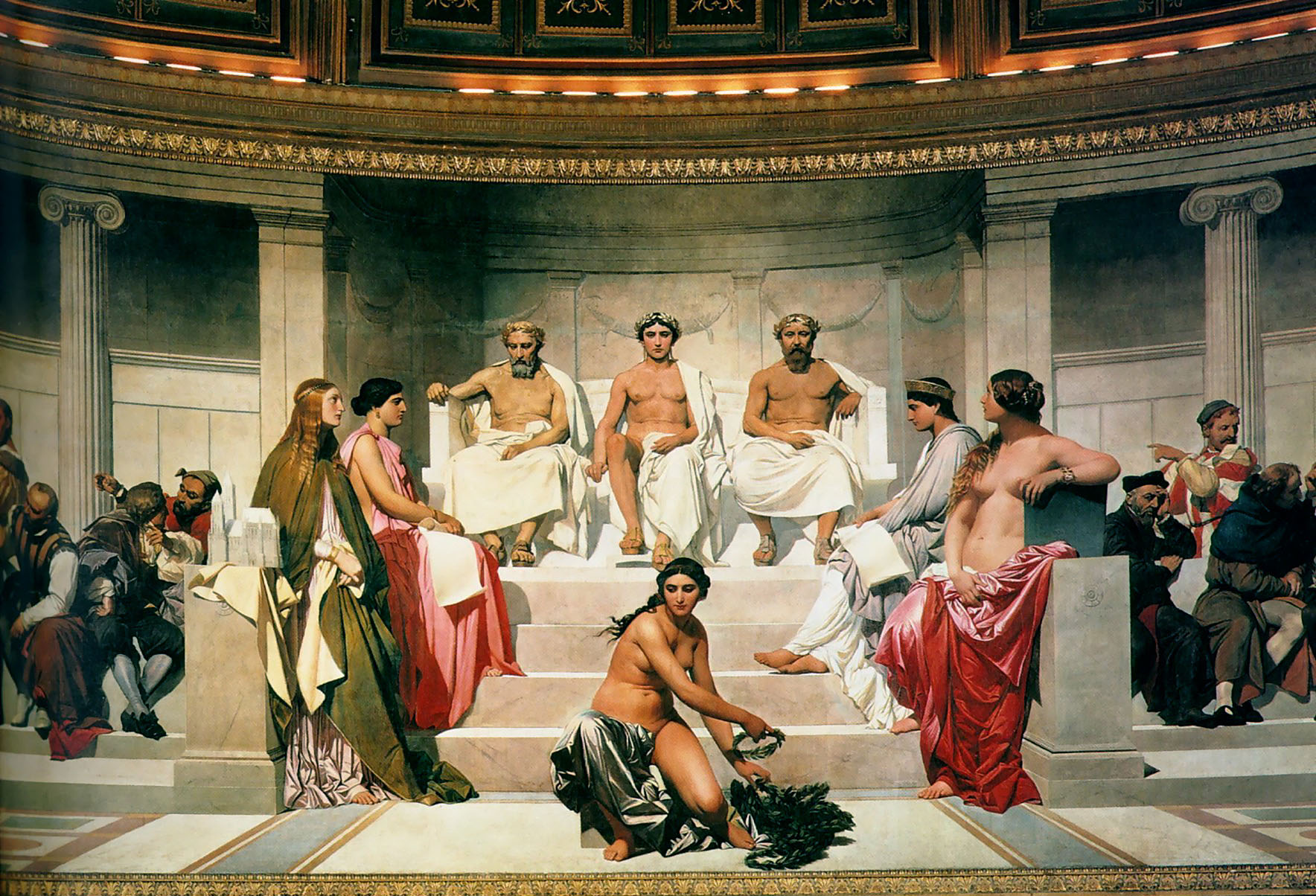
The Hémicycle mural by Paul Delaroche

In other ways Duban meant the entire complex as an open-air encyclopedia for artists and architects. The Palais des Études building features elaborate frescoes, the stairwells demonstrate various wall finishes, and the courtyard (glassed over by Duban in 1863) once held classical statuary and full-size copies of the columns of the Parthenon for study.

The core of the complex is a semi-circular award theater within the Palais, the Hémicycle d'Honneur, where the prizes were awarded. Duban commissioned Paul Delaroche to produce a great mural, 27 metres long, to represent seventy-five great artists of all ages, in conversation, assembled in groups. In the middle are three thrones occupied by the creators of the Parthenon: sculptor Phidias, architect Ictinus, and painter Apelles, symbolizing the unity of these arts. The mural took Delaroche three and a half years to complete, and it still stands as a powerful expression of the Beaux-Arts collaborative ideal.

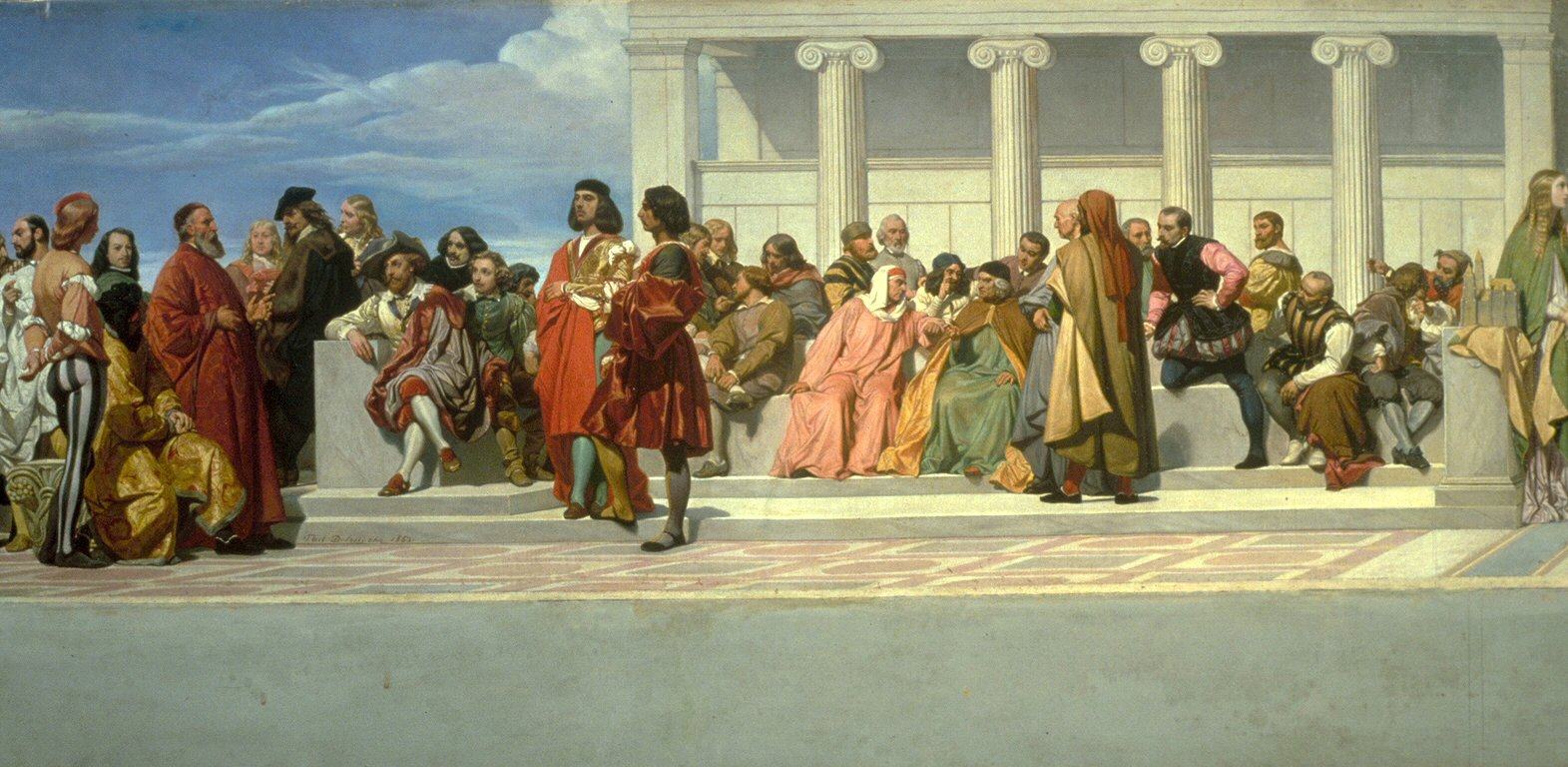
In this replica painting by Charles Béranger, the auditorium of École des beaux-arts is depicted. Walters Art Museum, Baltimore

Duban continued to expand and improve the complex for decades. Other major buildings include the 1820 Bâtiment des Loges, the modified cloister now called the Cour des Mûriers, the 1862 Bâtiment des Expositions which extended the campus to the Quai Malaquias, the Hôtel de Chimay built circa 1750 and acquired by the school in 1884, and a block of studios constructed circa 1945 in concrete by Auguste Perret.

== Palais des Études ==
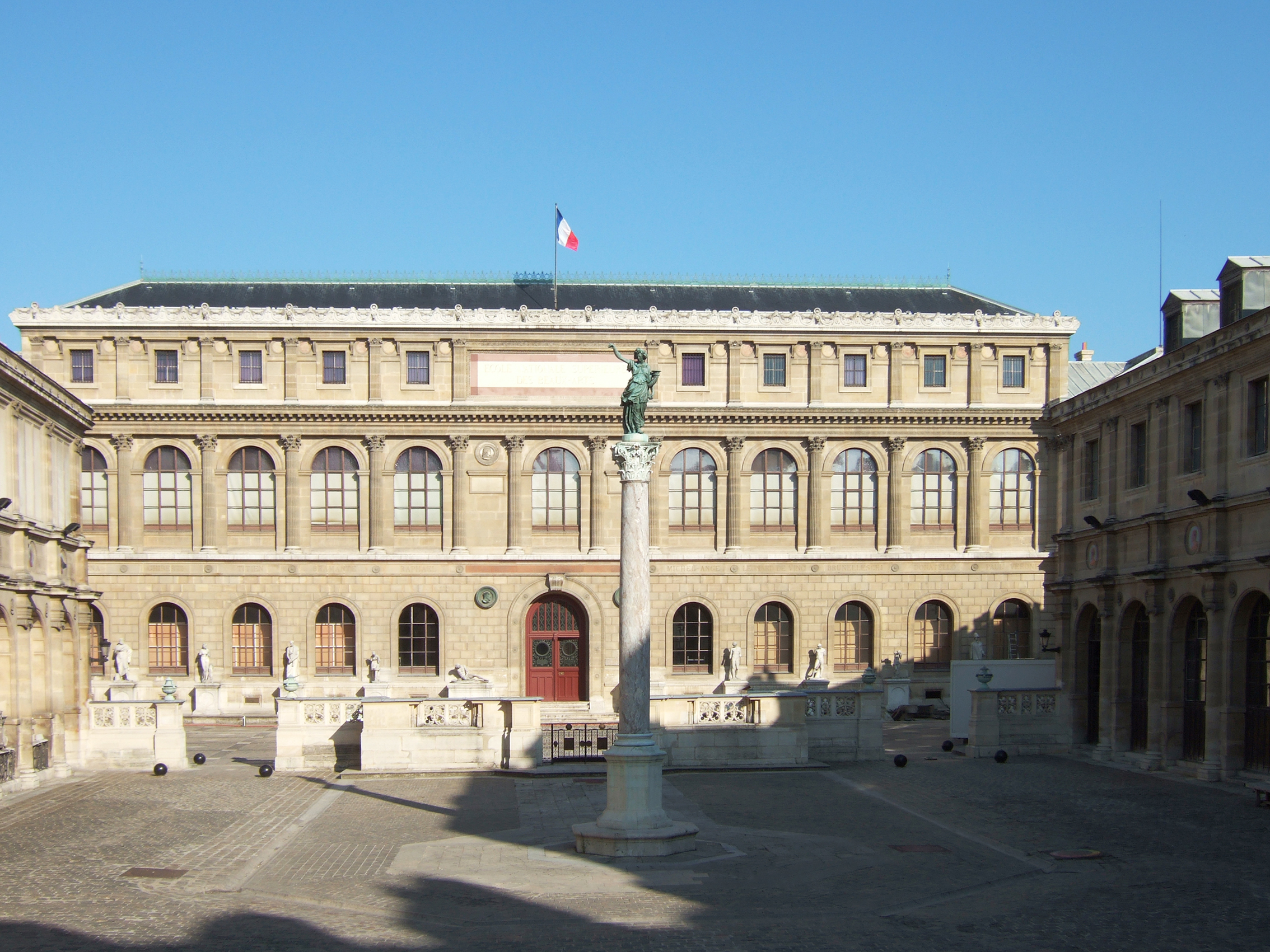
The Palais des Études in summer

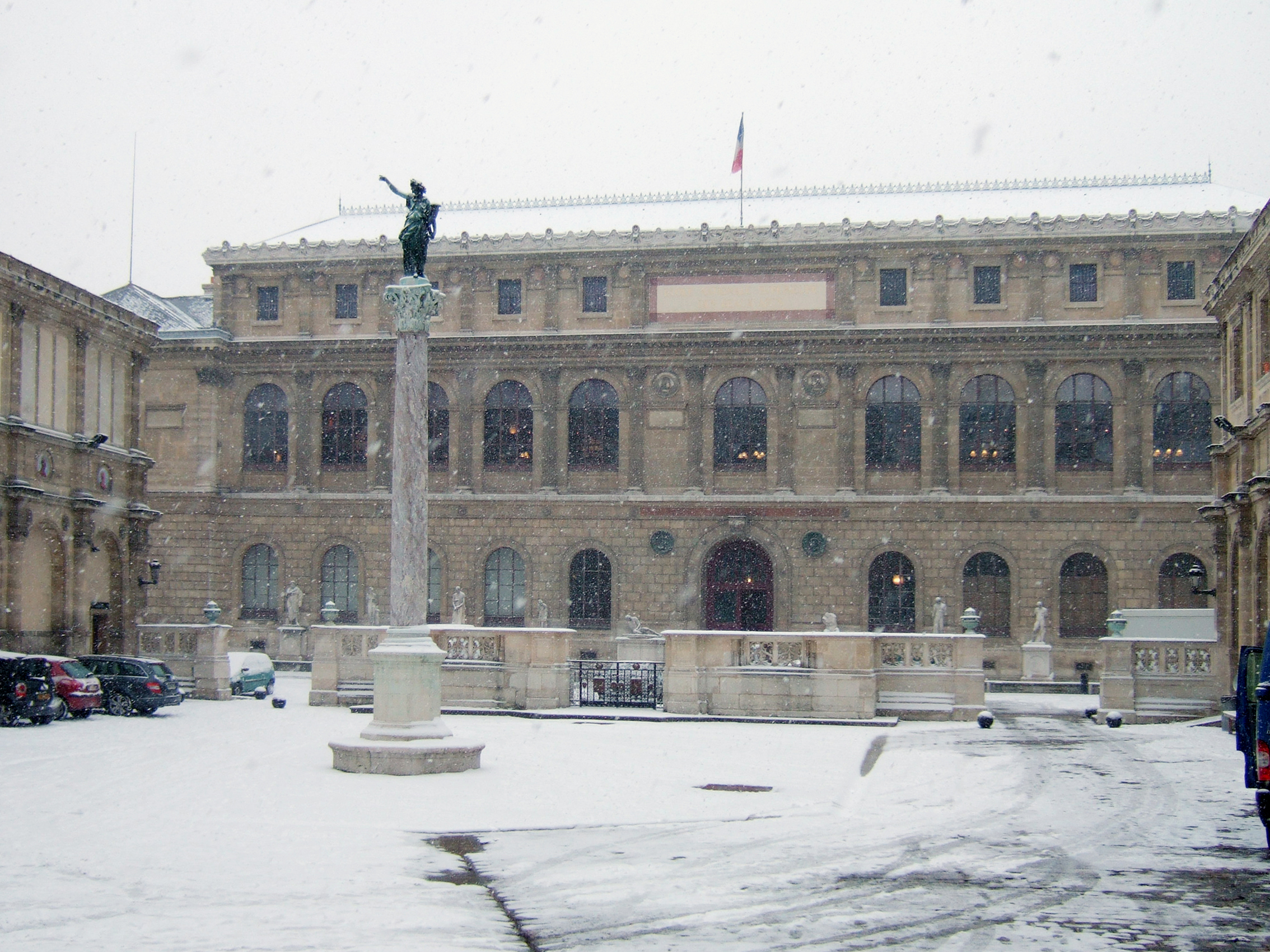
The Palais des Études in winter

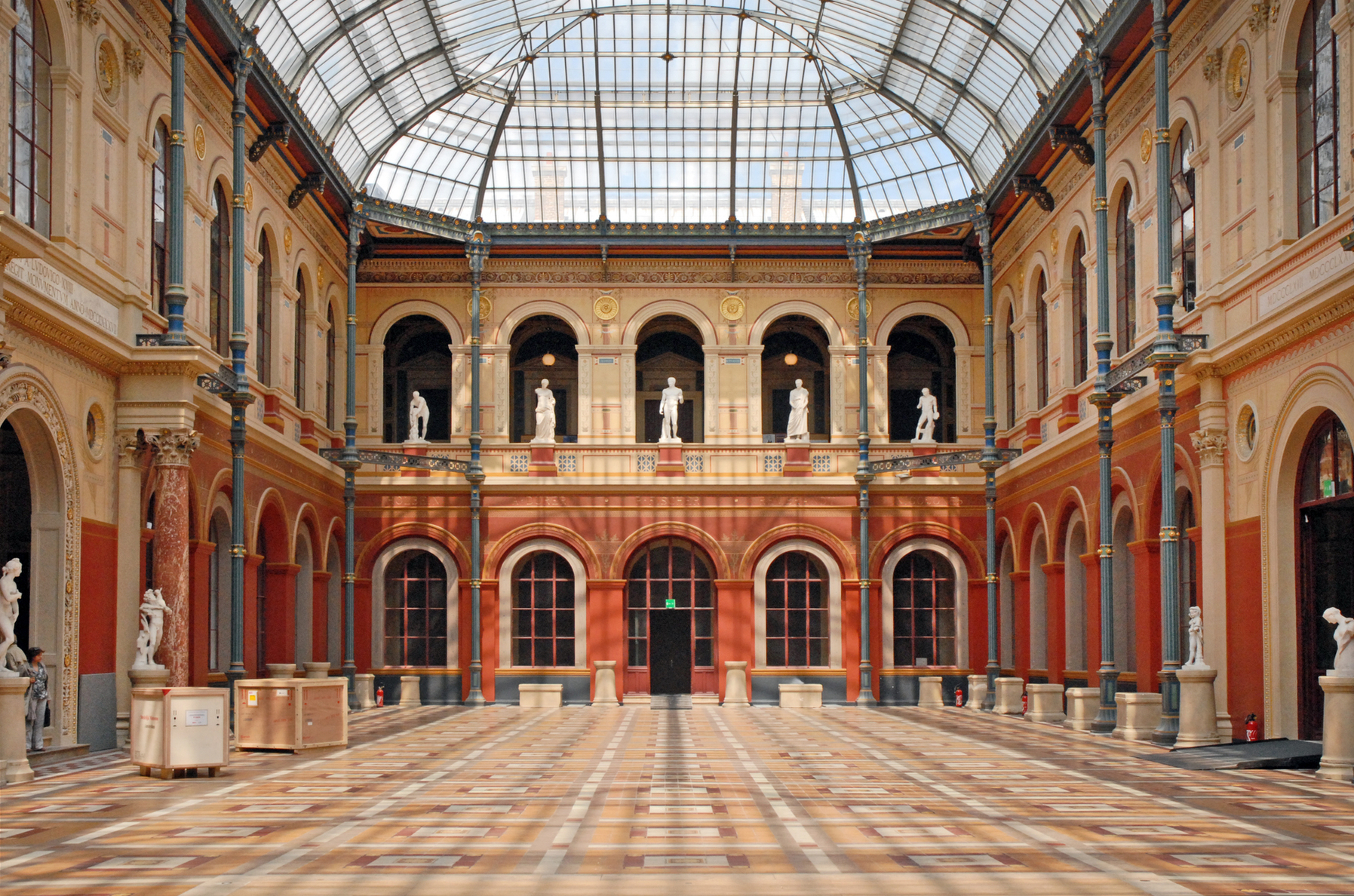
Palais des Études, Cour vitrée

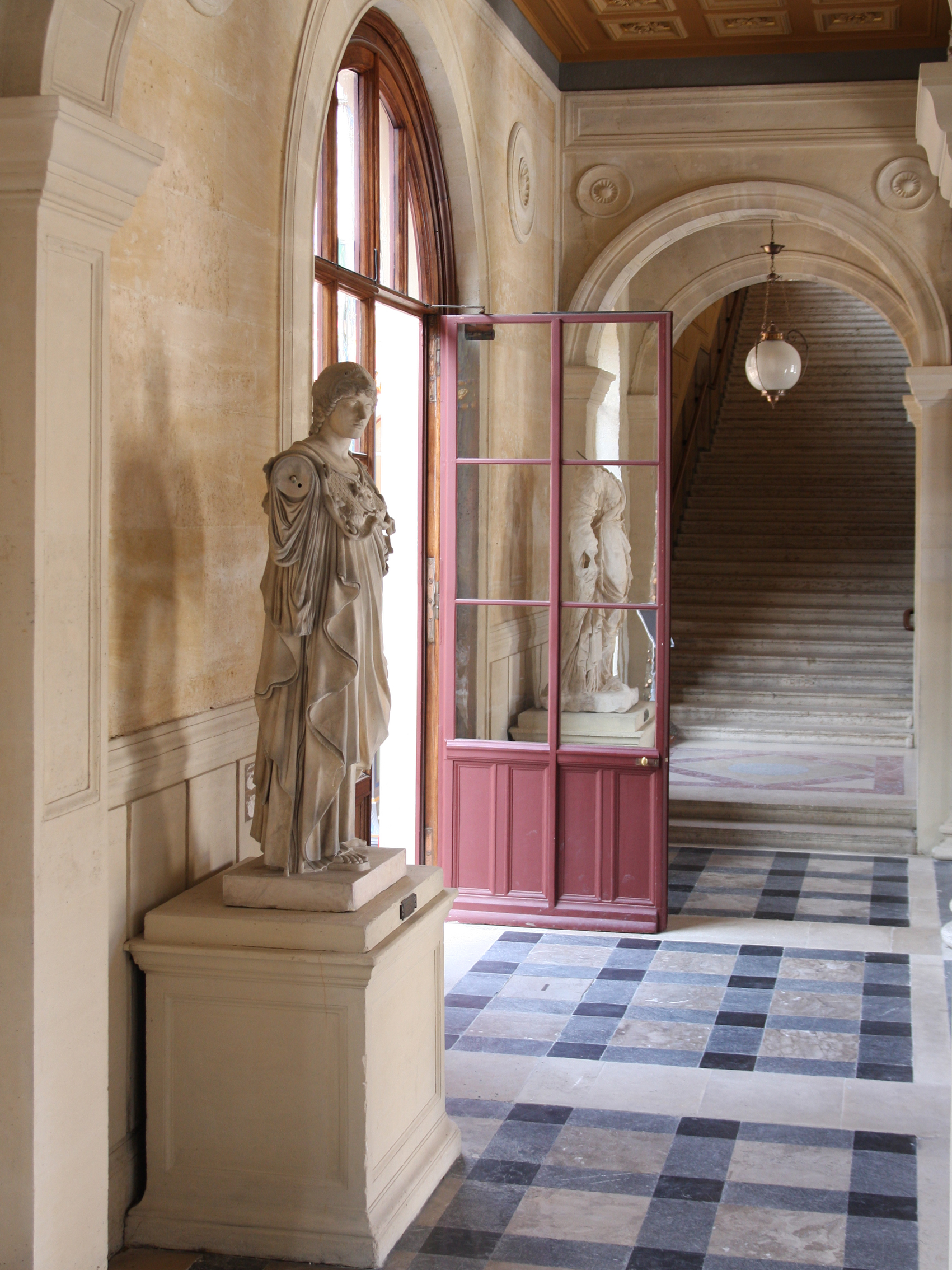
Between left and right gallery

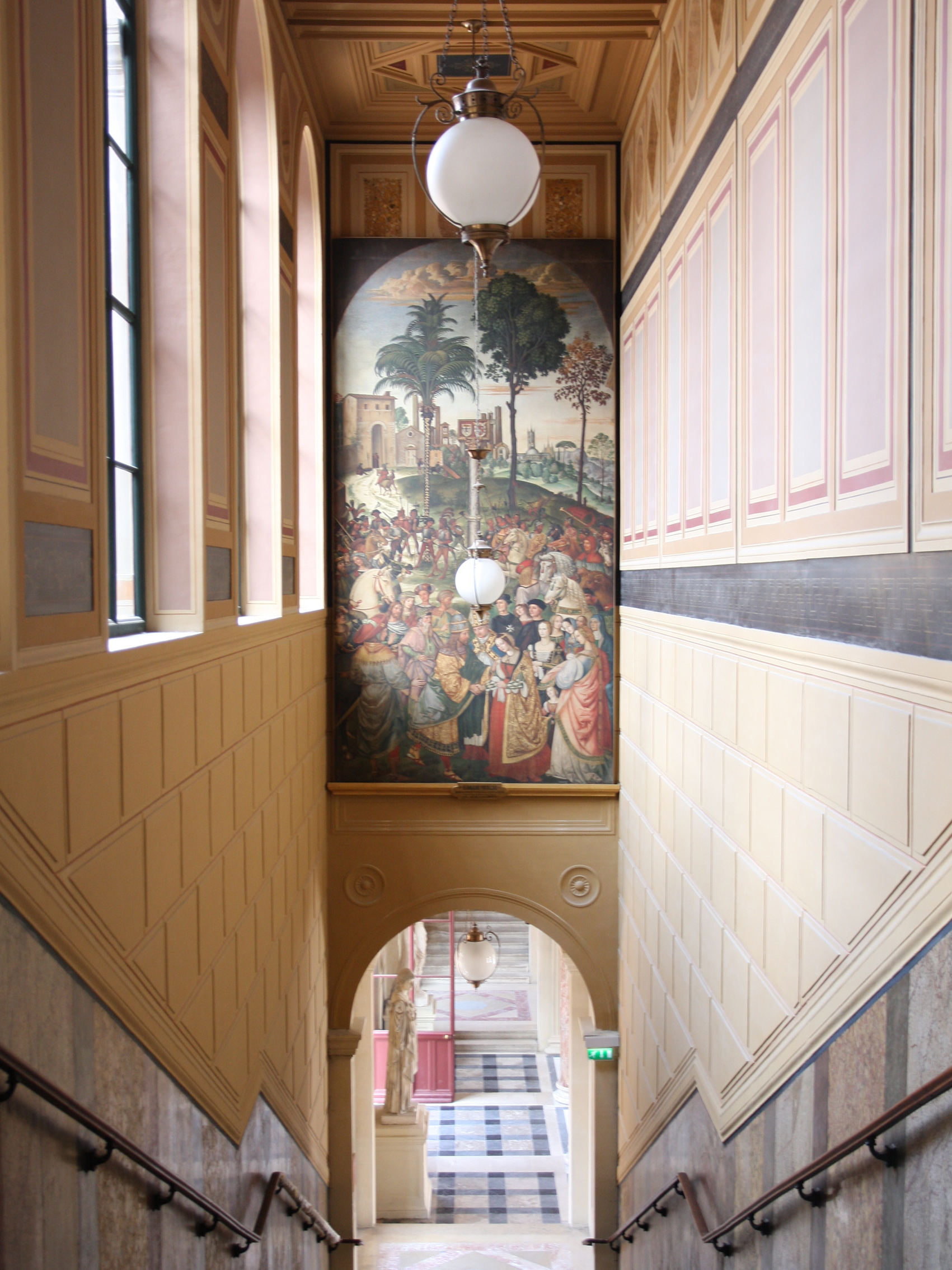
The stairway in the Palais des Études

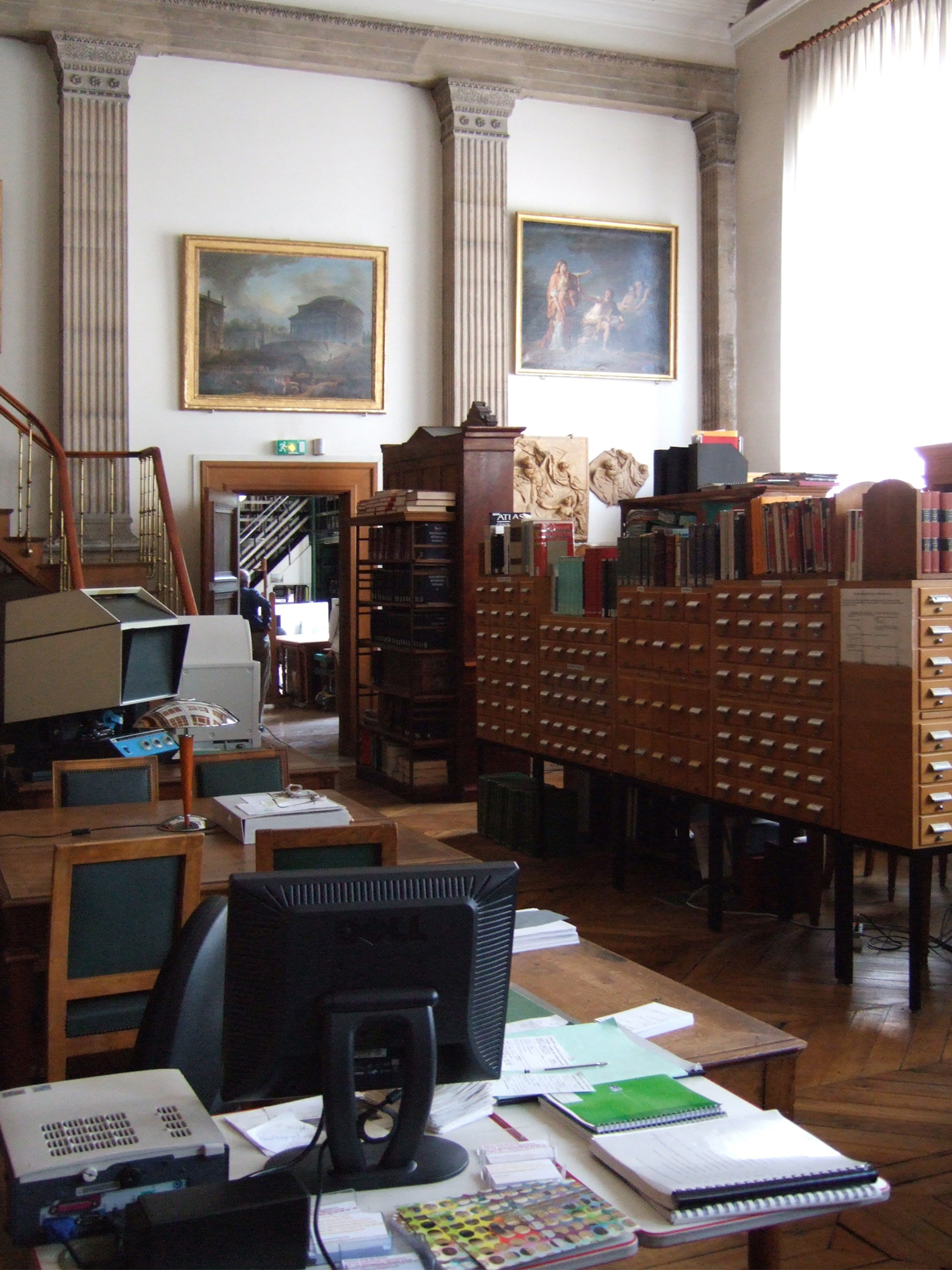
The archives in the Palais des Études

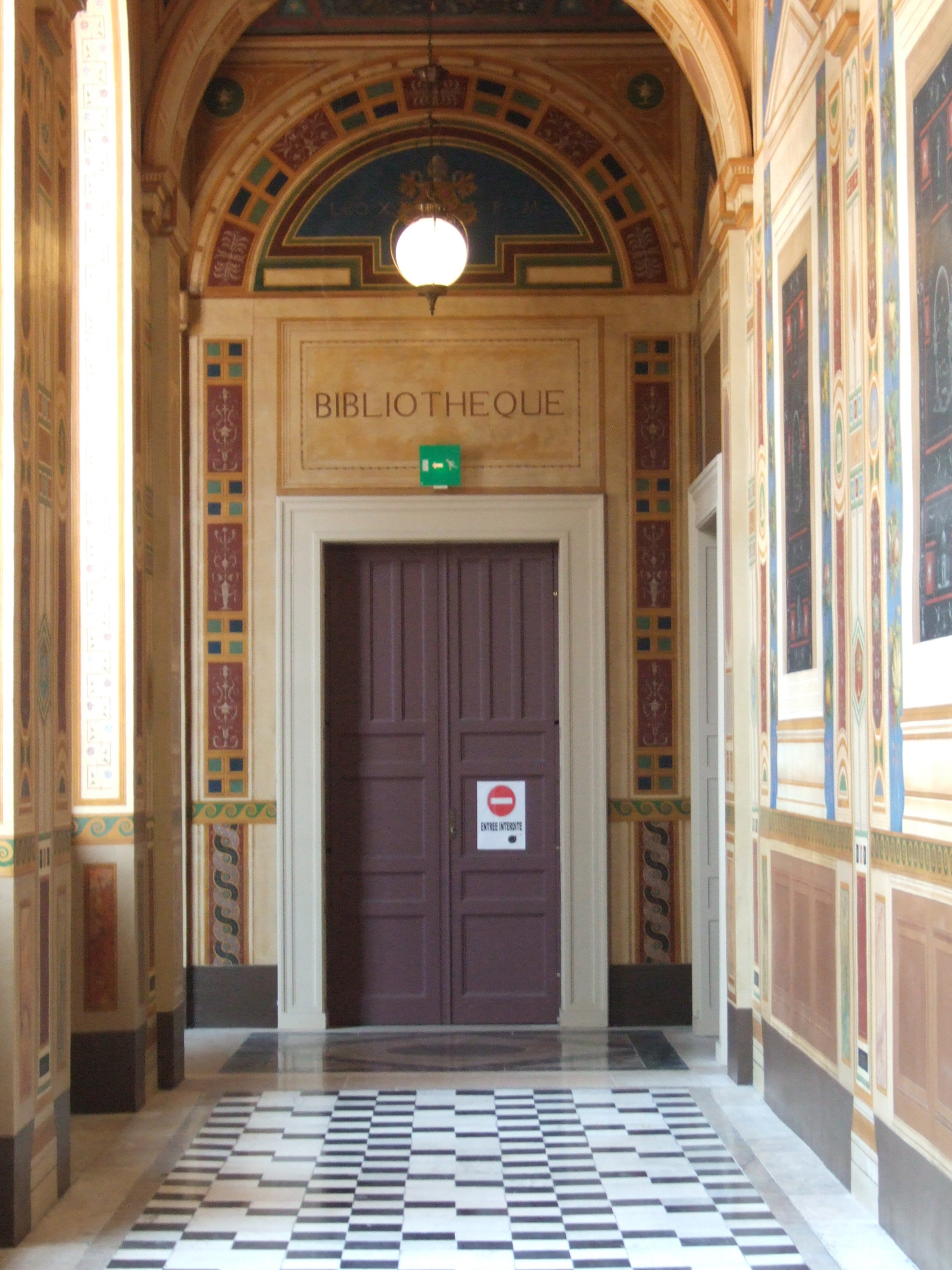
The library in the Palais des Études

== Chapel ==
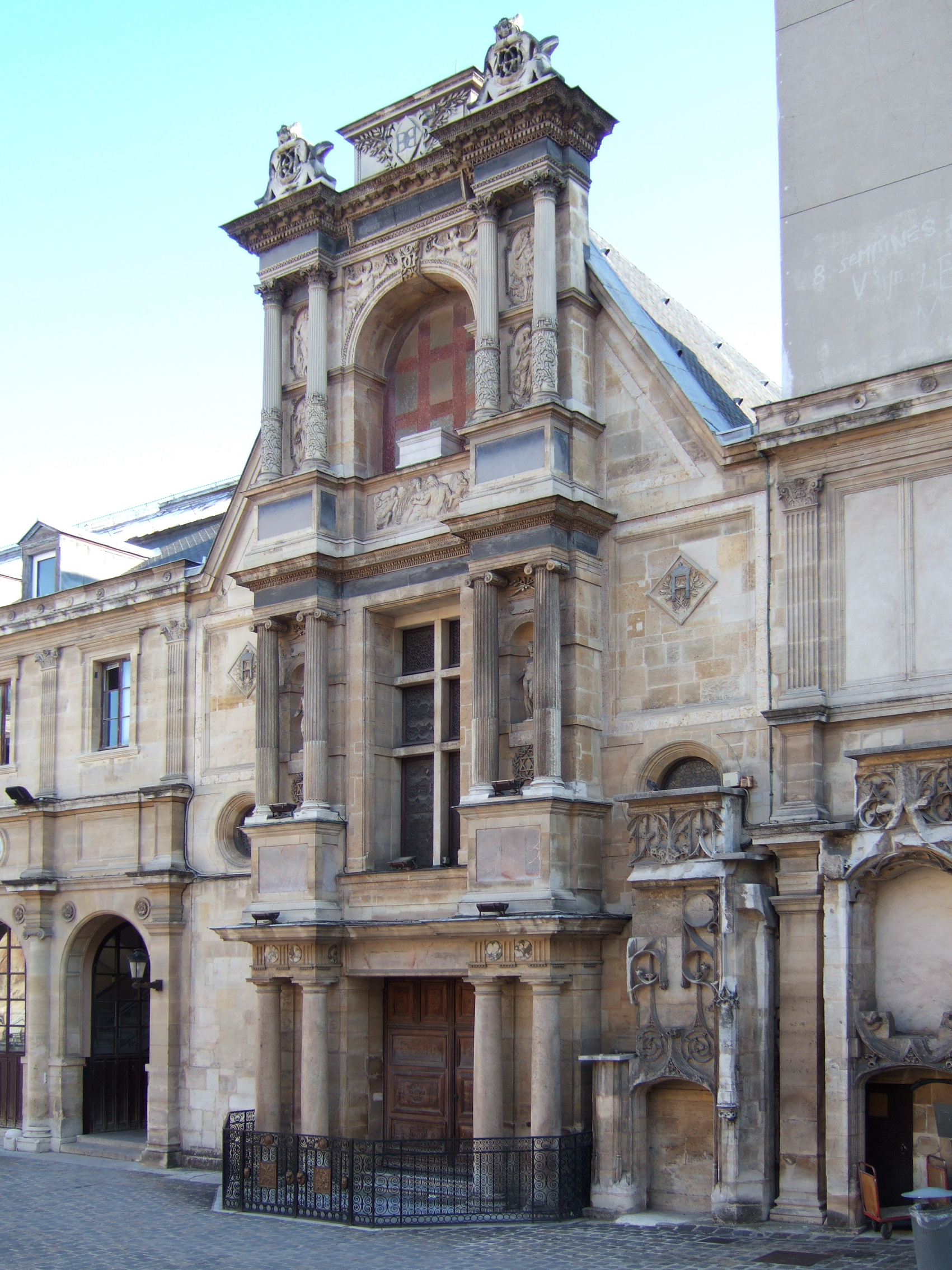
Exterior view of the chapel of the Beaux-Arts

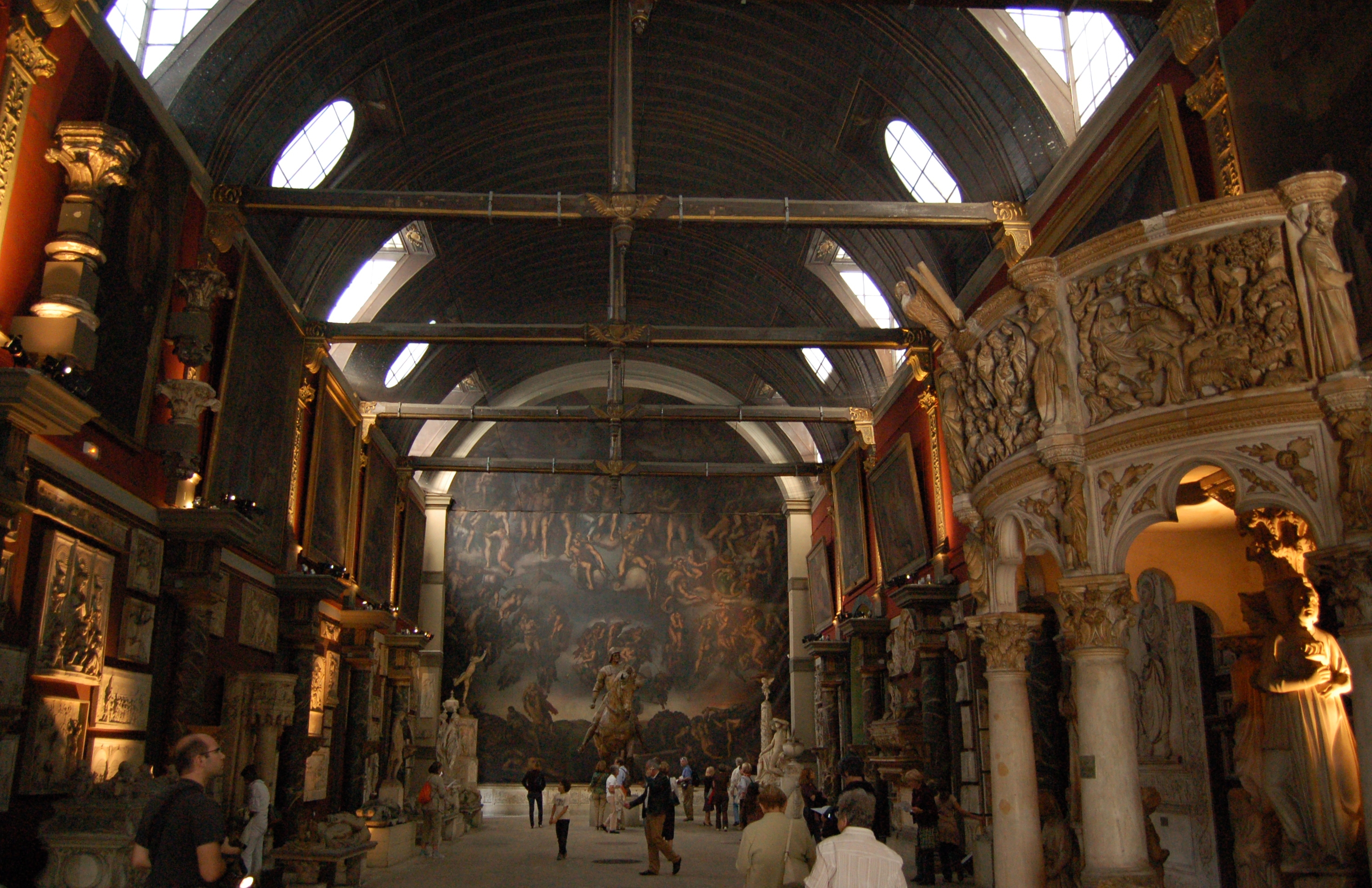
Interior view of the chapel of the Beaux-Arts

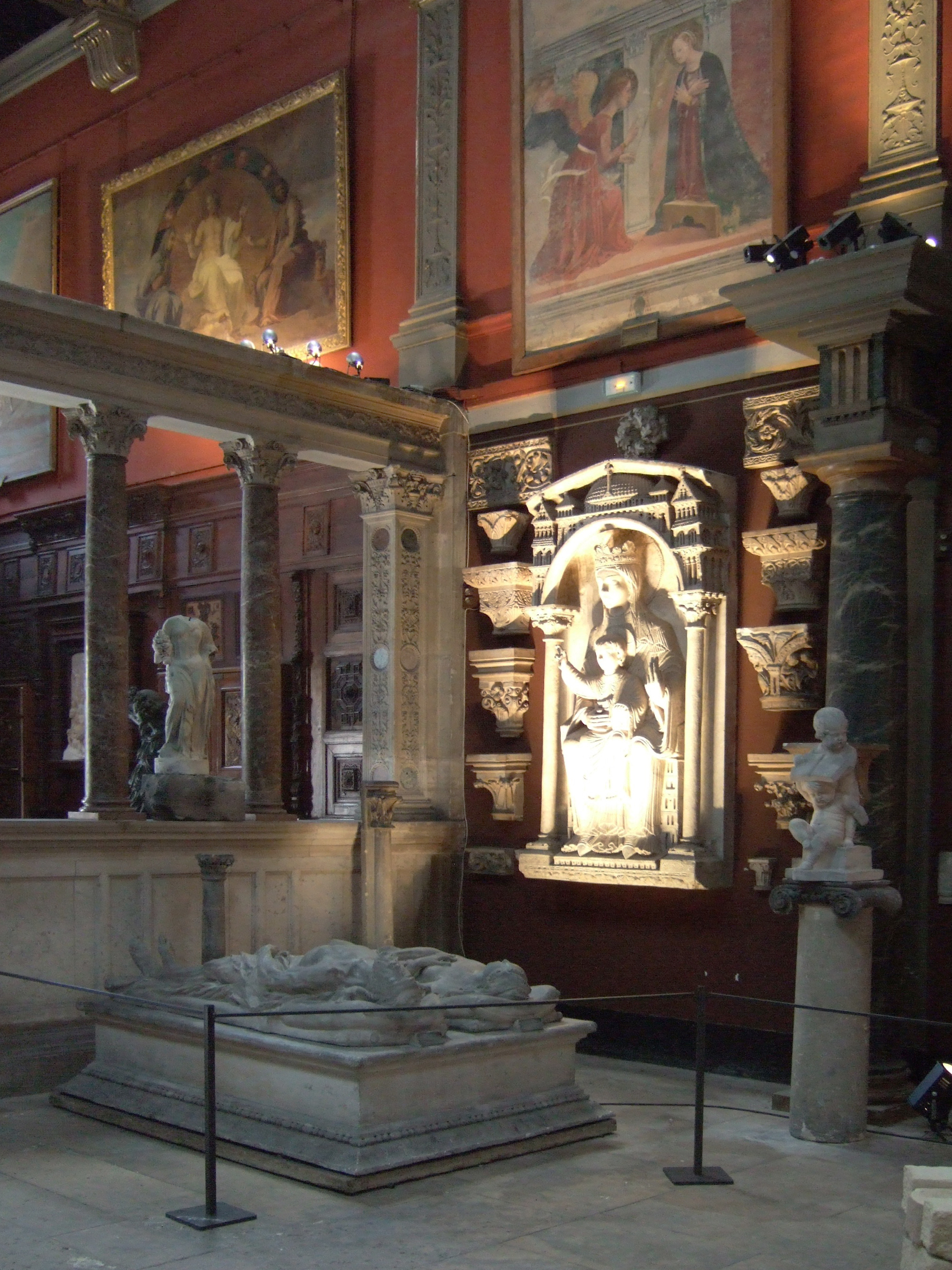
The chapel of the Beaux-Arts, detail

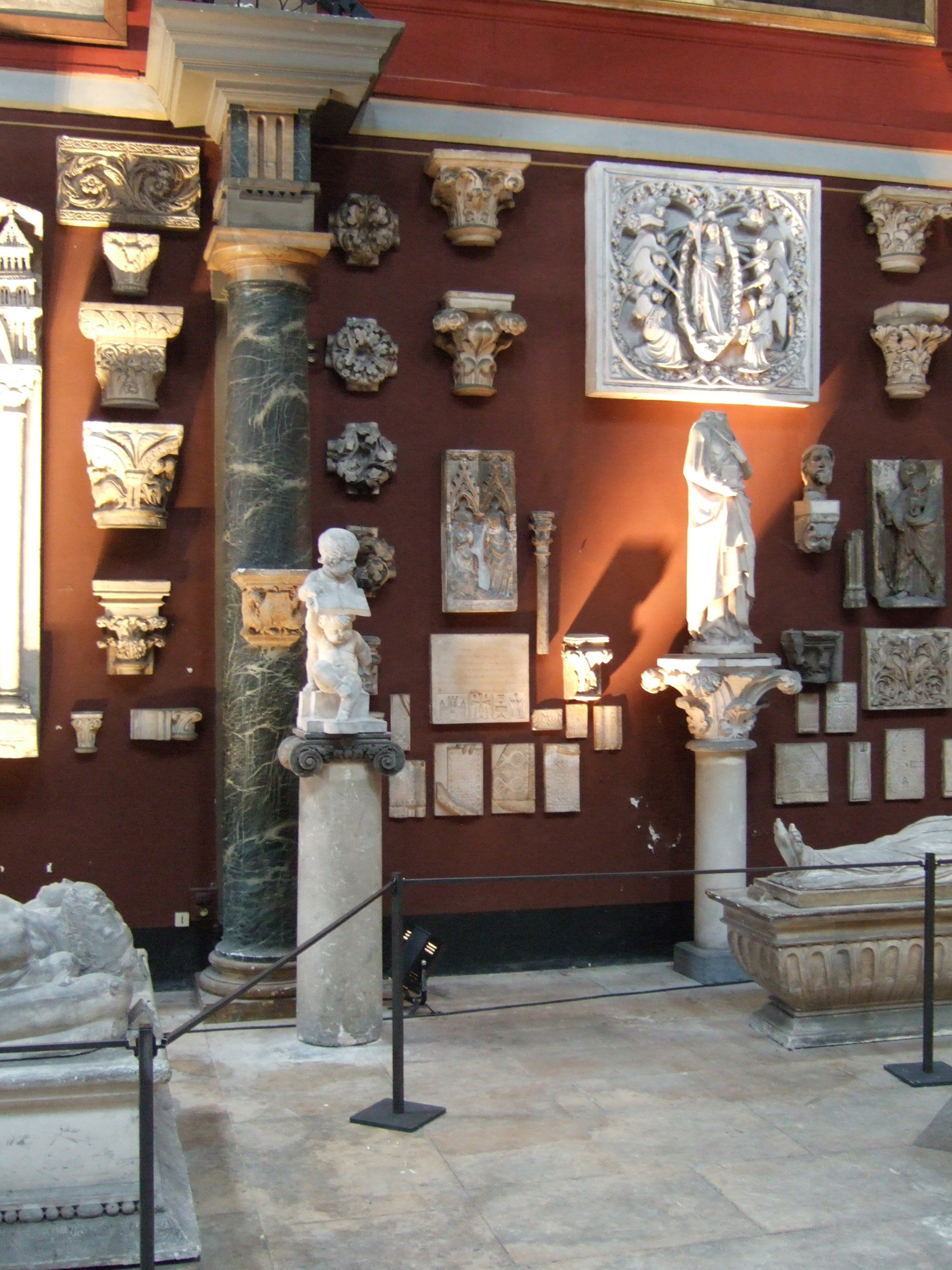
The chapel of the Beaux-Arts, detail

== Academic staff ==
=== Directors ===
- Jean-Baptiste Claude Eugène Guillaume, 1864–1878
- Paul Dubois, 1878
- François Wehrlin
- Yves Michaud, 1989–1997
- Alfred Pacquement
- Nicolas Untersteller 1948
- Jean-Didier Wolframm
- Henry-Claude Cousseau
- Nicolas Bourriaud, 2011–2015
- Jean-Marc Bustamante, 2015–2019
- Jean de Loisy, 2019–2021
- Alexia Fabre, 2022-2025
- Éric de Chassey, 2025

=== Notable instructors ===
- Marina Abramović
- Pierre Alechinsky
- Louis-Jules André
- Maurice Benayoun
- François Boisrond
- Christian Boltanski
- Duchenne de Boulogne
- Jean-Marc Bustamante
- Alexandre Cabanel
- Pierre Carron
- Béatrice Casadesus
- Jean-François Chevrier
- César
- Nina Childress
- Claude Closky
- Leonardo Cremonini
- Julien Creuzet
- Richard Deacon
- Olivier Debré
- Louis Girault
- Julien Guadet
- Abraham Hadad
- Fabrice Hybert
- Victor Laloux
- Jean-Paul Laurens
- Barbara Leisgen
- Charles Le Brun
- Henri Lehmann
- Michel Marot
- Antonin Mercié
- Annette Messager
- Gustave Moreau
- Jean-Louis Pascal
- Auguste Perret
- Emmanuel Pontremoli
- Abraham Pincas
- Paul Richer
- Charles-Caïus Renoux
- Jean-Joseph Sue, father
- Jean-Joseph Sue, son
- Tadashi Kawamata
- Tatiana Trouvé
- Jean-Luc Vilmouth

== Notable alumni ==
- Nadir Afonso, painter
- Paul Ahyi, painter, sculptor; designer of the flag of Togo
- Theo Akkermann, German sculptor
- Wahbi al-Hariri, sculpture, painting, architecture
- Rodolfo Amoedo, painting
- Ouanes Amor, painting
- Beatrice Valentine Amrhein, painting
- Émile André, architecture
- Yolande Ardissone, painting
- Ximena Armas, painting
- Léon Azéma, architecture
- Théodore Ballu, architecture
- Myron G. Barlow, painting
- Lucien Georges Bazor, sculpture
- Jules Benoit-Lévy, painting
- Ahmed Benyahia, painting, sculpture, film
- Jean-Francois Bocle, painter
- Ernest Boiceau, drawing, painting, architecture
- Maurice Boitel, painting
- David Tai Bornoff, installation, multi-media, film
- Gustave Boulanger, painting
- Antoine Bourdelle, sculpture
- Michel Bouvet, designer, poster artist
- Bernard Buffet, painting
- Charles Burki, Dutch illustrator
- Antoine Camilleri, painting
- Olivia Chaumont, architect, transgender activist
- Eugène Chigot, painting
- Paul-Henry Chombart de Lauwe, sociologist
- Georgette Cottin-Euziol, French-Algerian architect
- Aimé-Jules Dalou, sculpture
- Henri-Camille Danger, painting
- Mario Pani Darqui, architecture
- Jacques-Louis David, painting
- Gabriel Davioud, architecture
- Olivier Debré, painting
- Edgar Degas, painting
- Eugène Delacroix, painting
- Marie-Antoinette Demagnez, sculpture
- Jean Desbois, architecture
- Louis Deschamps, painting
- Paul Devautour, installation, multi-media
- Jean Dries, painting
- Félix Duban, architecture
- Agegnehu Engida, painter
- Henri Evenepoel, painting
- Fang Ganmin, painting, sculpture
- Anne Flournoy, filmmaker
- Jean-Honoré Fragonard, painting
- Yitzhak Frenkel, painter, sculptor, glasswork
- Valentino Garavani, fashion designer
- Charles Garnier, architecture
- Tony Garnier, architecture
- Eliahu Gat, painting
- Théodore Géricault, painting
- David Gerstein, painting, sculpture
- Louis Girault, architecture
- Hubert de Givenchy, fashion designer
- Aaron Goodelman, sculptor
- Liliana Gramberg, painter, printmaker
- Jacques Gréber, landscape architect
- Michael Gross, painter, sculptor
- Julien Guadet, architecture
- Yves Hernot, painting, surrealistic photography
- Emil Hünten, painter
- Jean-Auguste-Dominique Ingres, painting
- Charles Isabelle, architecture
- Amédée Joullin, painting
- Bernadette Kanter, sculptor
- Majida Khattari, multidisciplinary artist
- Ludwik Konarzewski, painting, sculpture
- Victor Laloux, architecture
- Armand Laroche, painting
- Alexandre-Louis Leloir, painting, illustration
- Liem Bwan Tjie, architect
- Lin Fengmian, painting
- Frédérique Lucien, painting
- Albert Marquet, painting
- Henri Matisse, painting
- Sophie Matisse, painting
- Edgar Maxence, painting
- Annette Messager, installation, multi-media
- Vann Molyvann, architecture
- Claude Monet, painting
- Gustave Moreau, painting
- Julia Morgan, architecture; first woman to graduate from the school
- Michel Mossessian, architecture
- Marie Muracciole, curator, art critic
- Indira Nair, painting
- Camila Oliveira Fairclough, painter
- Ong Schan Tchow (alias Yung Len Kwui), painting
- Alphonse Osbert, painting
- Pan Yuliang, painting
- Jean-Louis Pascal, architecture
- Edward Plunkett, 20th Baron of Dunsany, painting, sculpture
- Théophile Poilpot, painting
- Christian de Portzamparc, architecture; Pritzker Prize laureate (1994)
- Léon Printemps, painting
- Syed Haider Raza, painting
- Alfred-Georges Regner, painting, engraving
- Pierre-Auguste Renoir, painting
- Jean-Paul Réti, sculpture
- Henri Richelet, painting
- Benjamin de Rolland, painting
- Hannes Rosenow, painting
- Georges Rouault, painting
- Abolhassan Khan Sadighi, painter, sculptor
- Bojan Šarčević, sculpture
- Louis-Frédéric Schützenberger, painting
- Mahmoud Sehili, painter
- Sohrab Sepehri, Iranian painter, poet, writer
- Joann Sfar, design
- Alfred Sisley, painting
- Edward Stott, painting
- Clement Nye Swift, painting
- Lorado Taft, sculptor
- Siavash Teimouri, architect, historian of architecture
- António Teixeira Lopes, sculpture
- Albert-Félix-Théophile Thomas, architecture
- Roland Topor, design
- Morton Traylor, painting
- Guillaume Tronchet, architecture
- Léon Vaudoyer, architecture
- Lydia Venieri, painting, sculpture, photography, multimedia
- Nelly de Vogüé, painter
- Adrien Voisin, American sculptor
- Lucien Weissenburger, architecture
- Lucien Wercollier, sculpture
- Elsa Werth, artist
- Robert Jay Wolff, painting, sculpture
- Xu Beihong, painting
- Yan Pei-Ming, painting
- Yan Wenliang, painting

== Cour du Mûrier ==
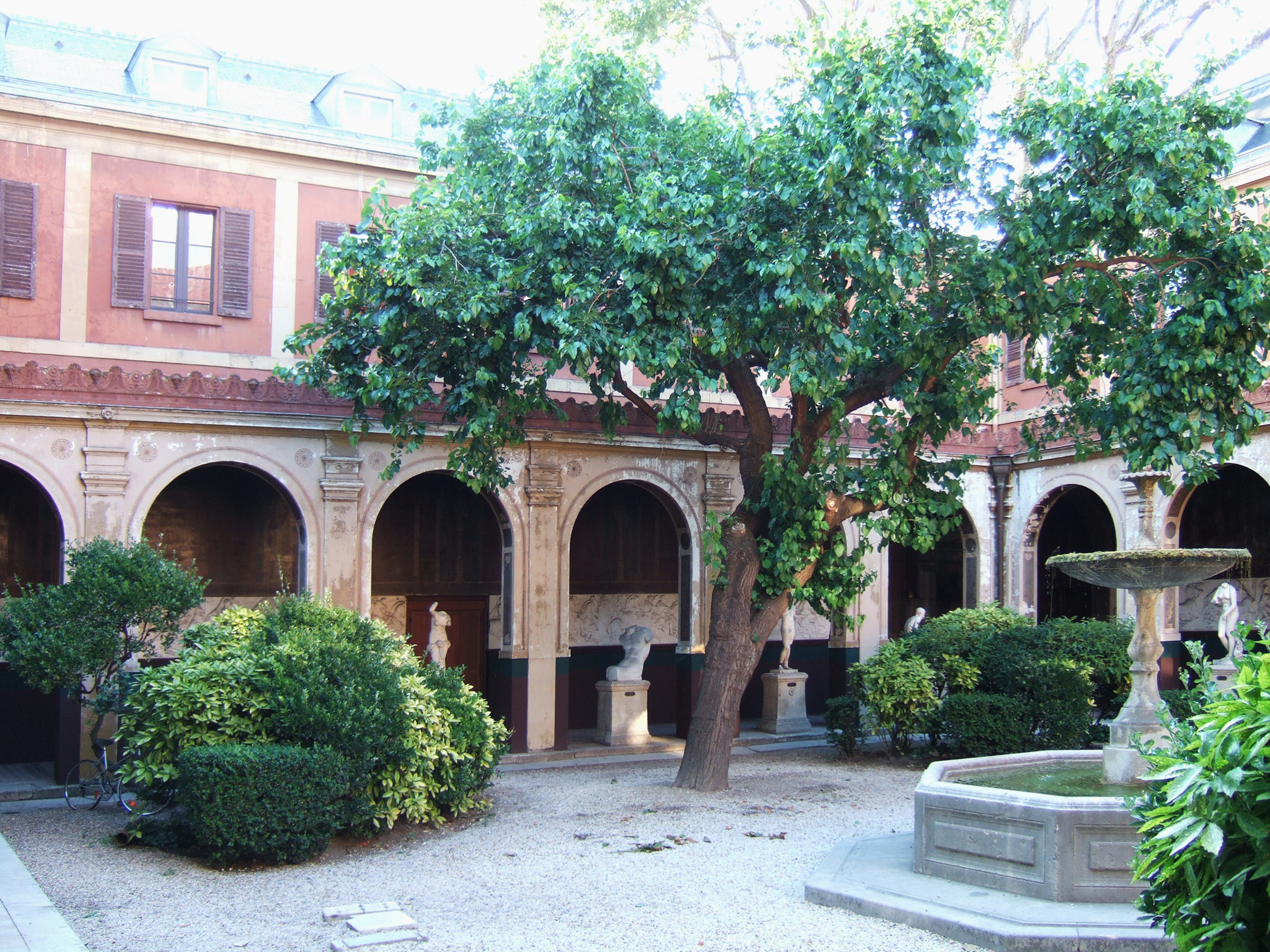
Cour du Mûrier

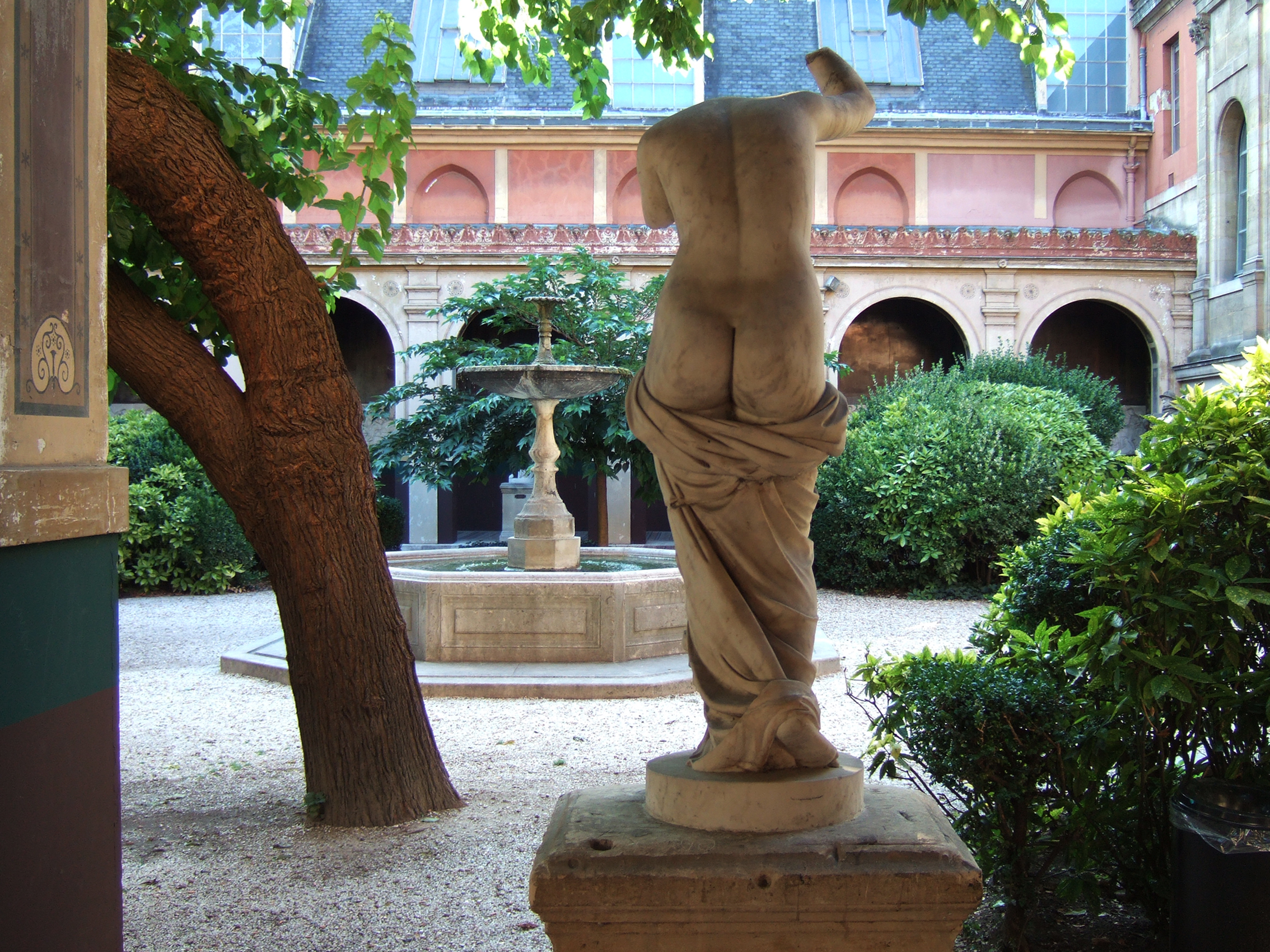
Cour du Mûrier

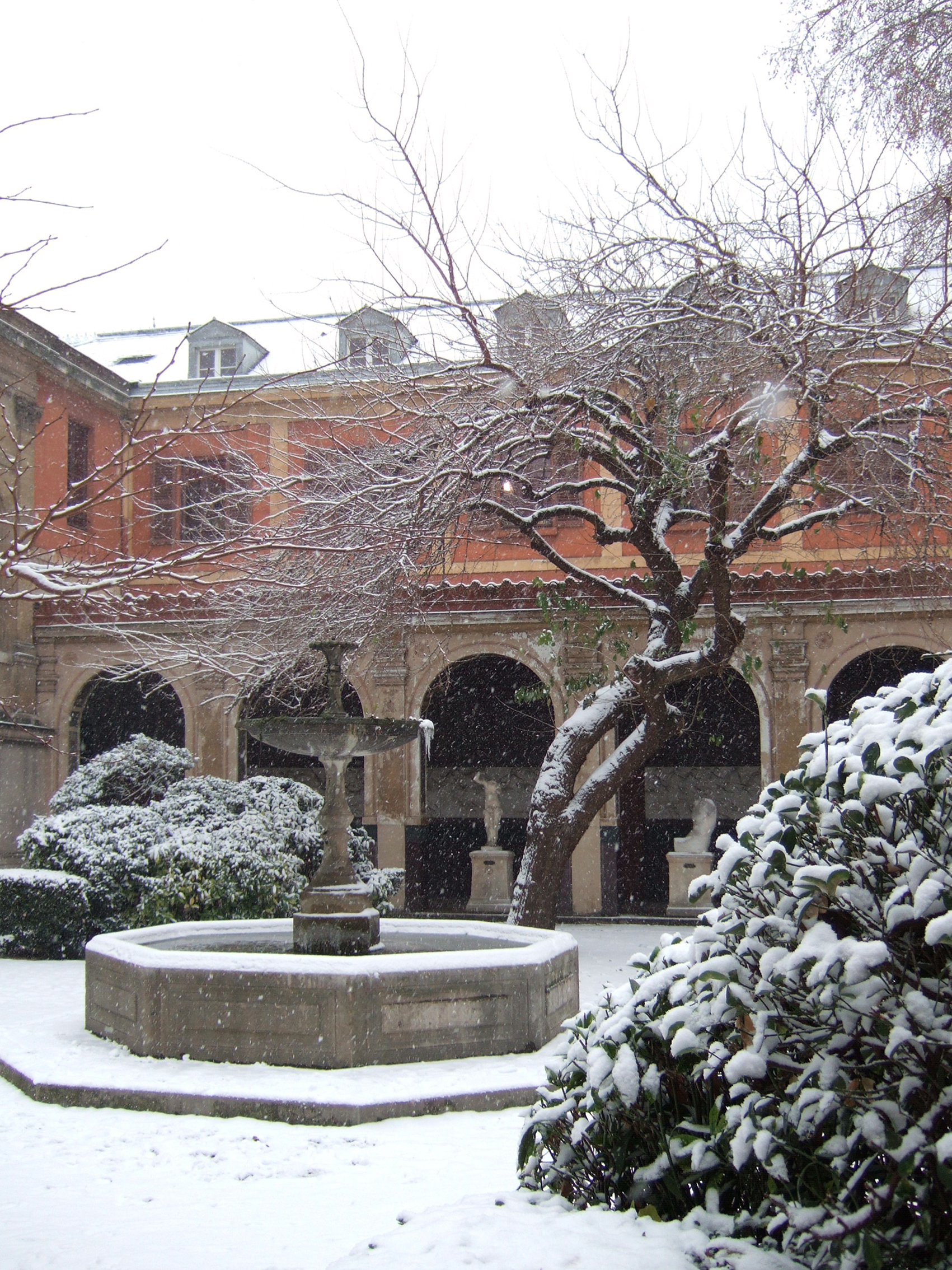
Cour du Mûrier

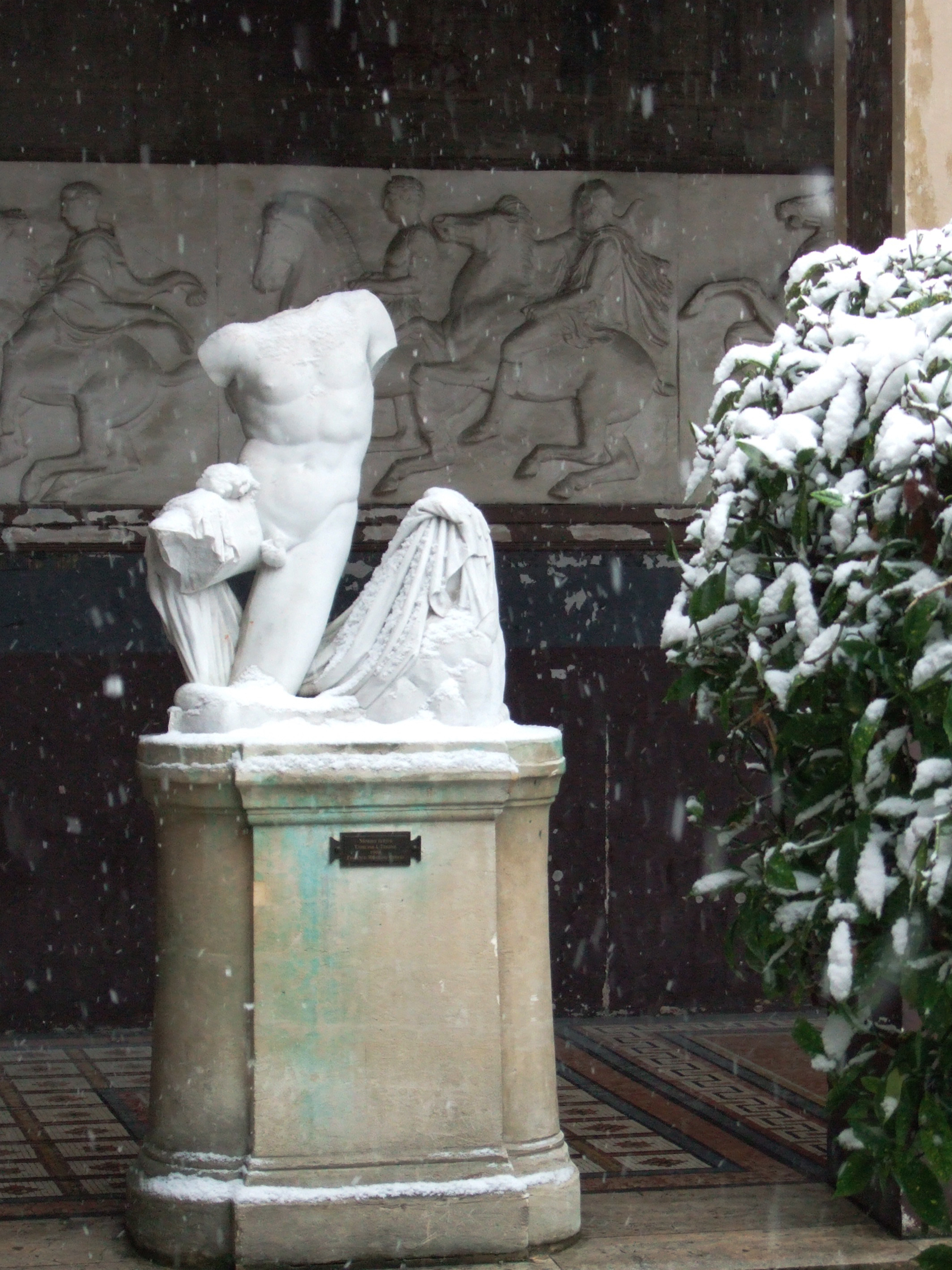
Cour du Mûrier, detail 1

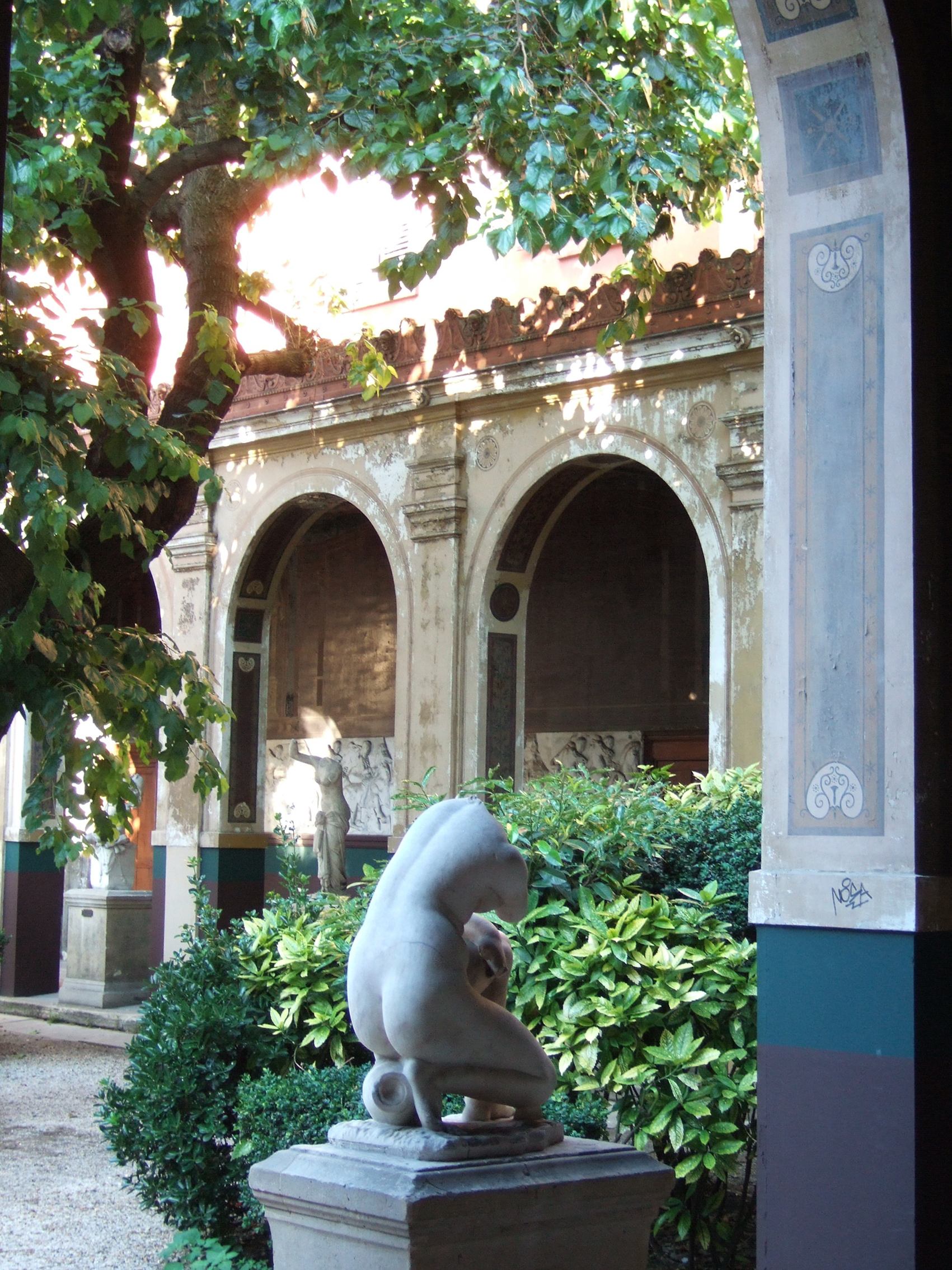
Cour du Mûrier

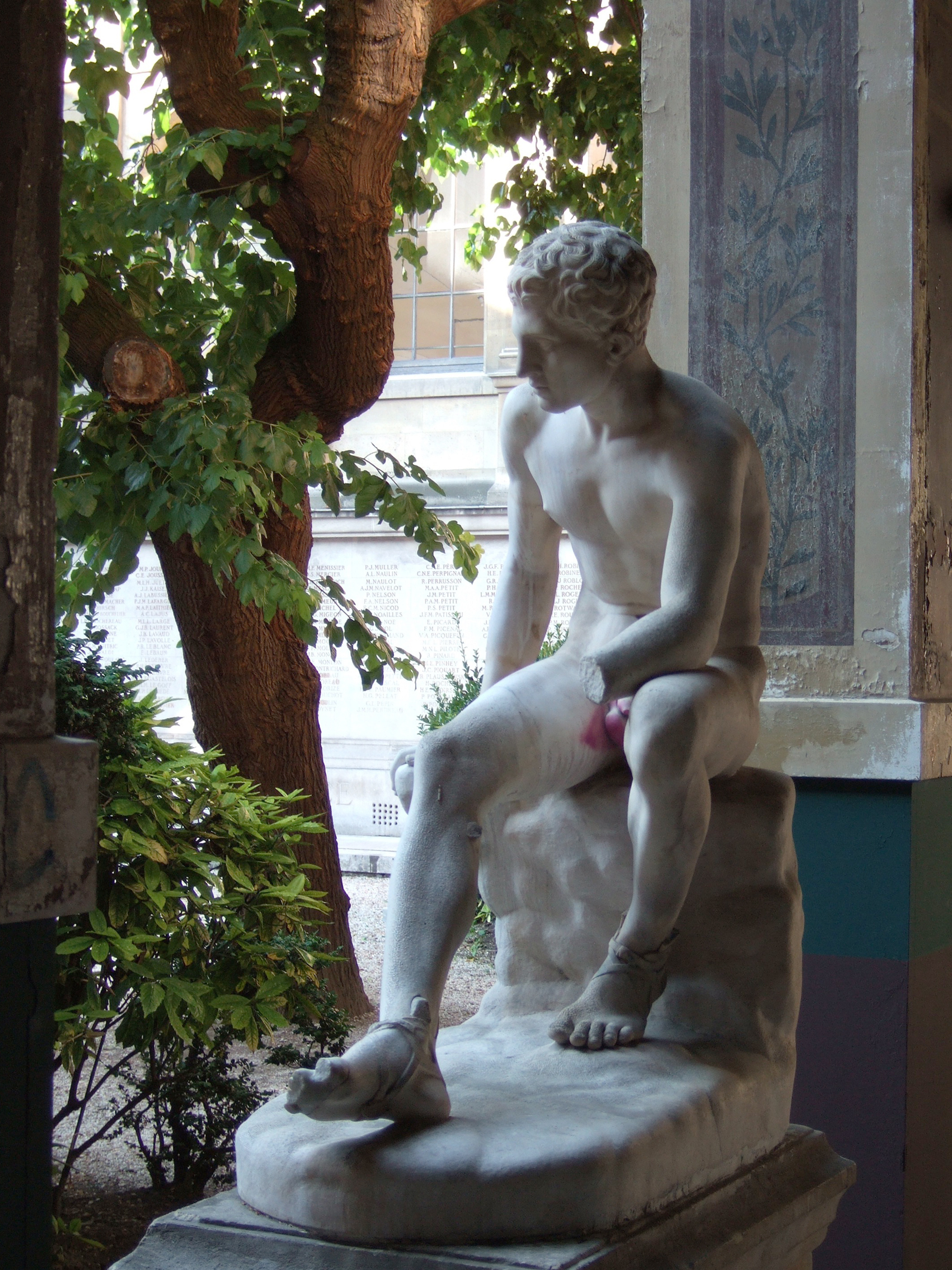
Cour du Mûrier, detail 3

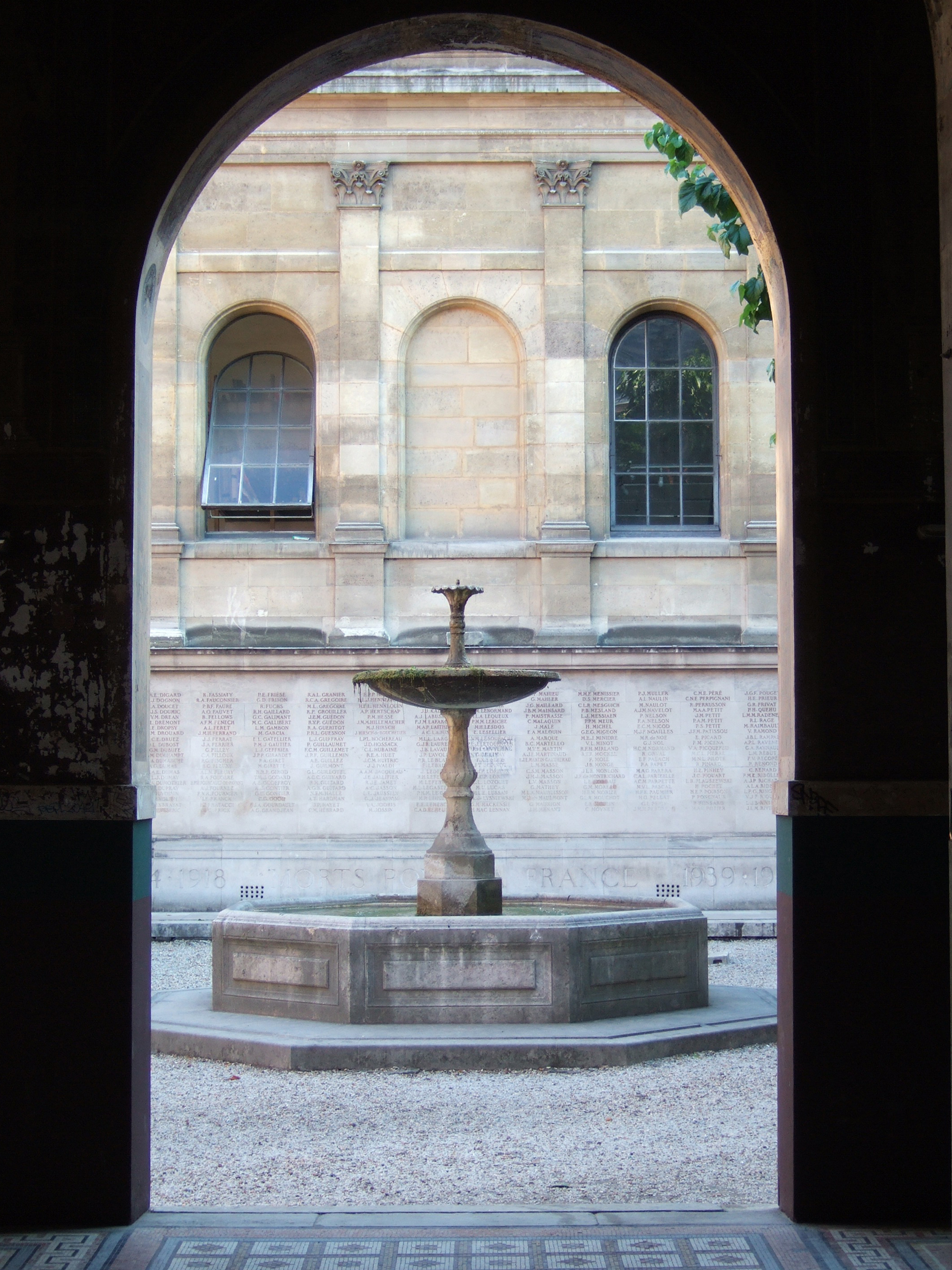
Cour du Mûrier, detail 4

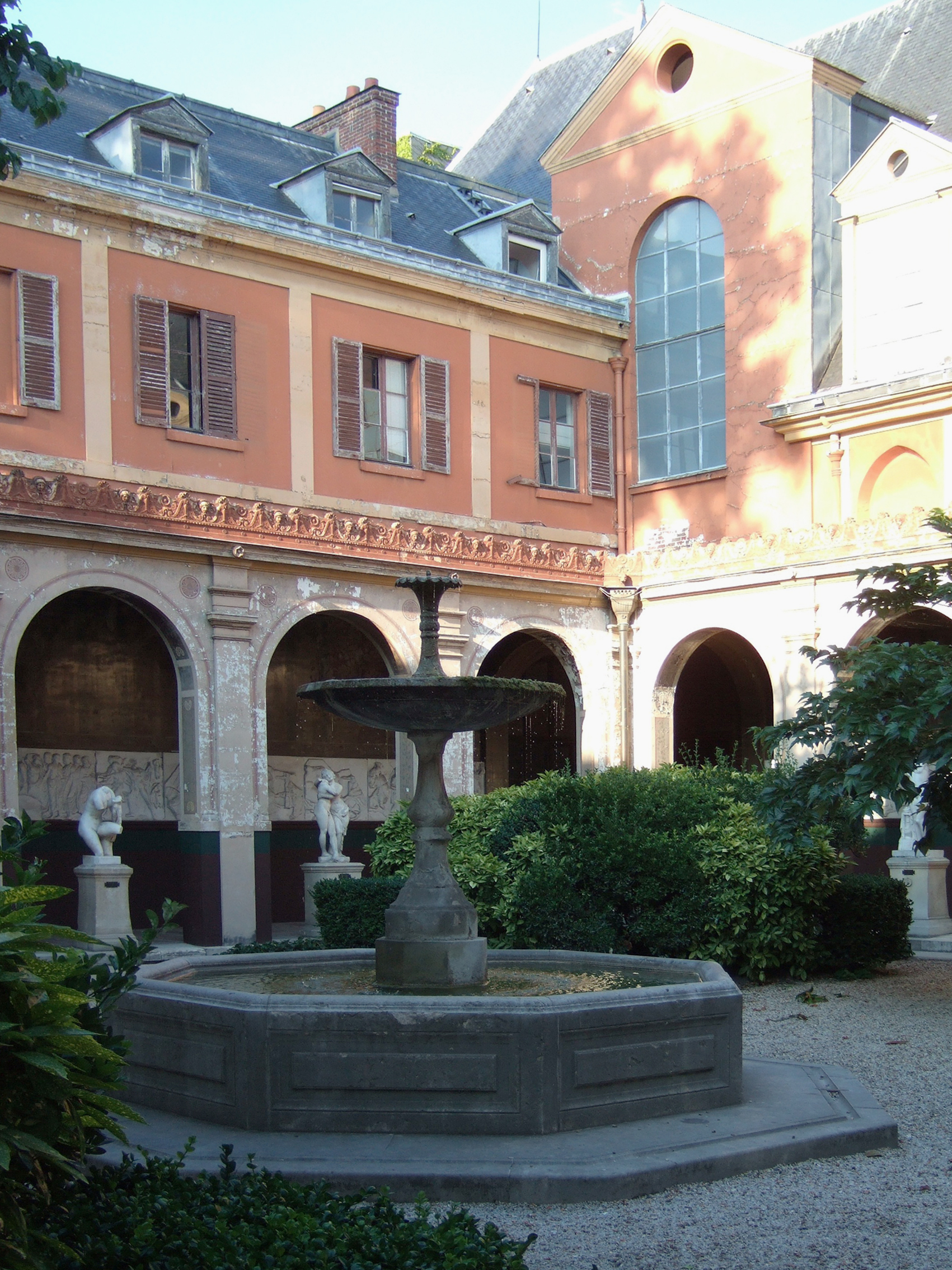
Cour du Mûrier

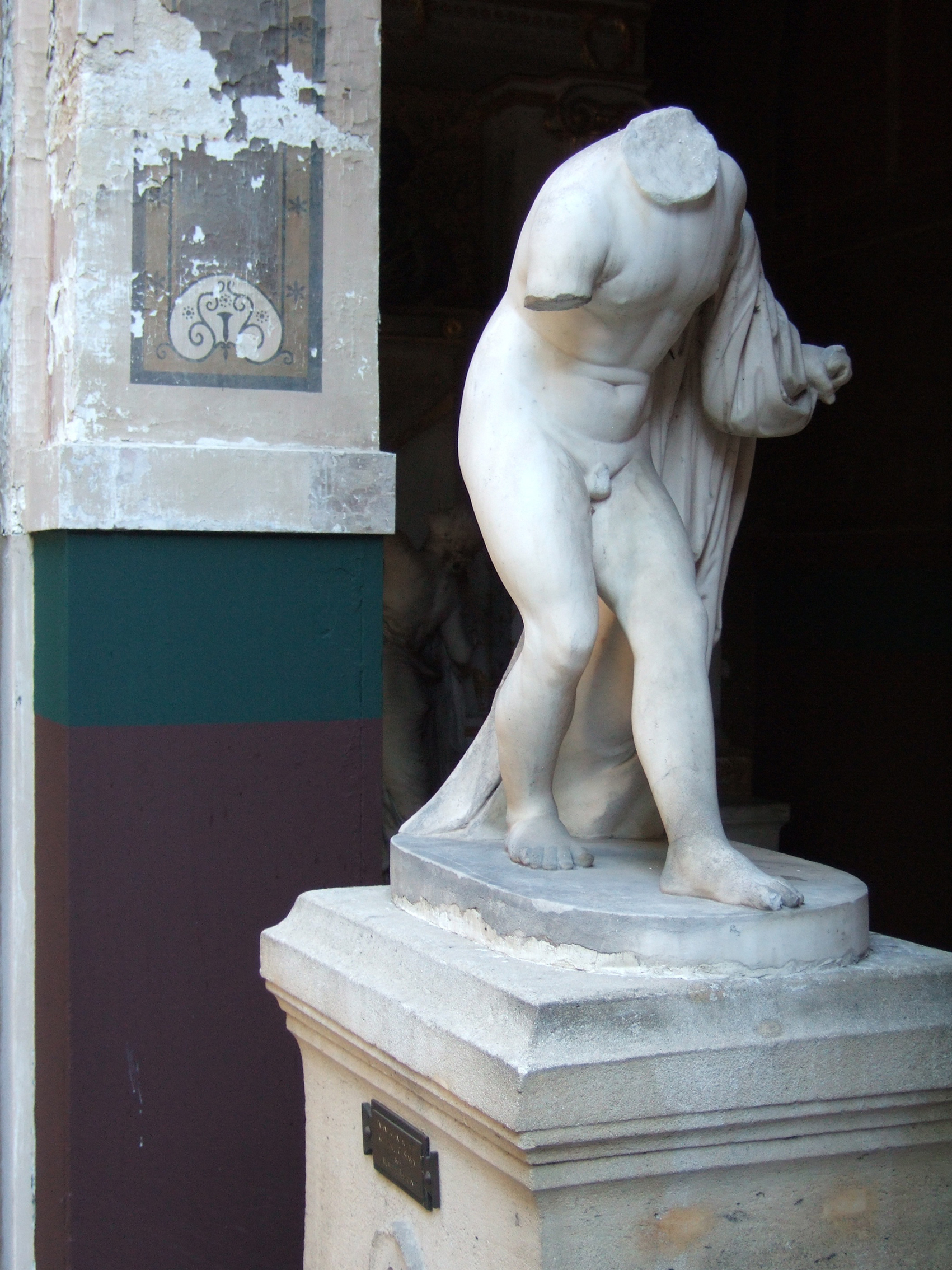
Cour du Mûrier, detail 5

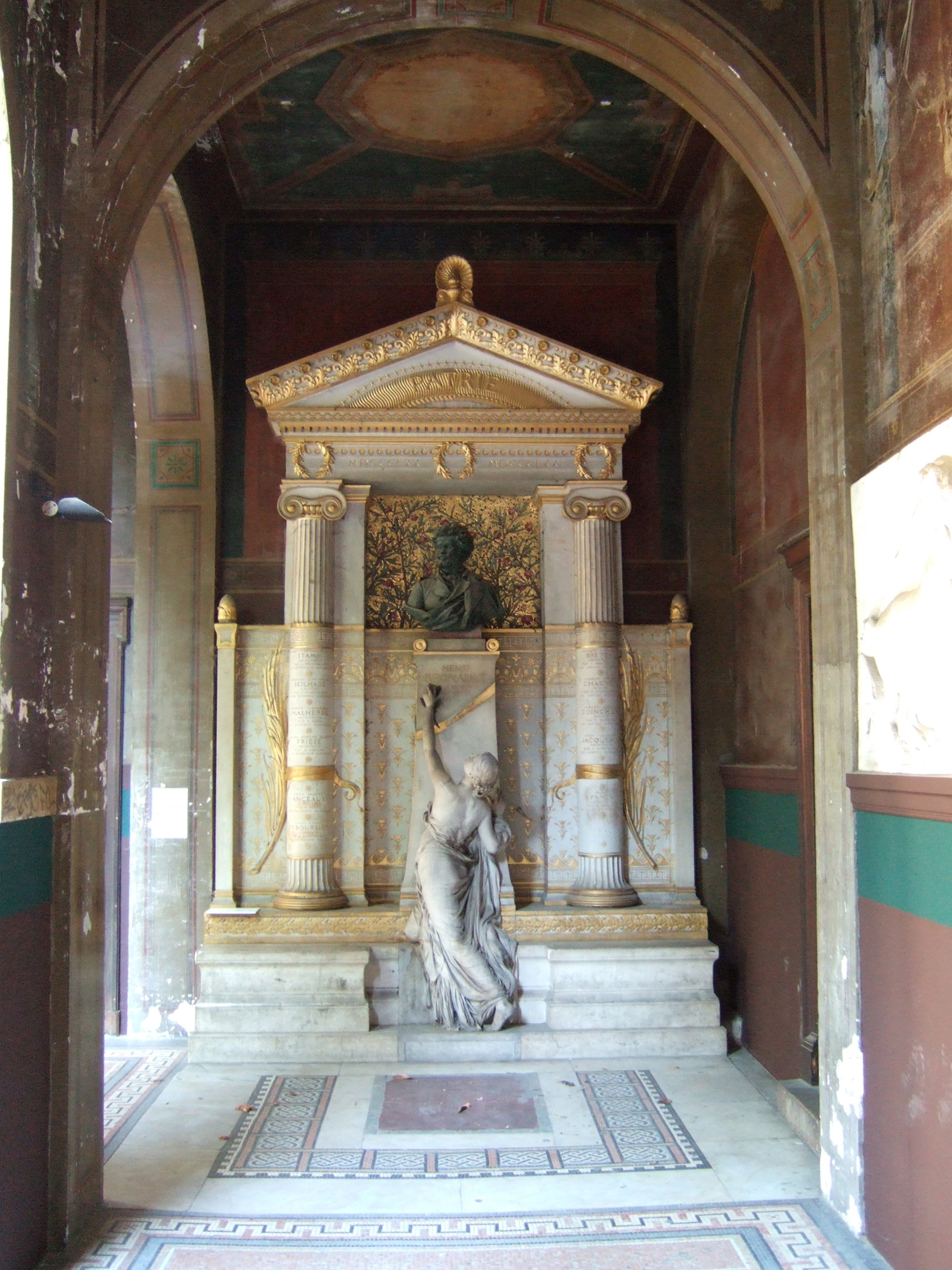
Cour du Mûrier, detail 6

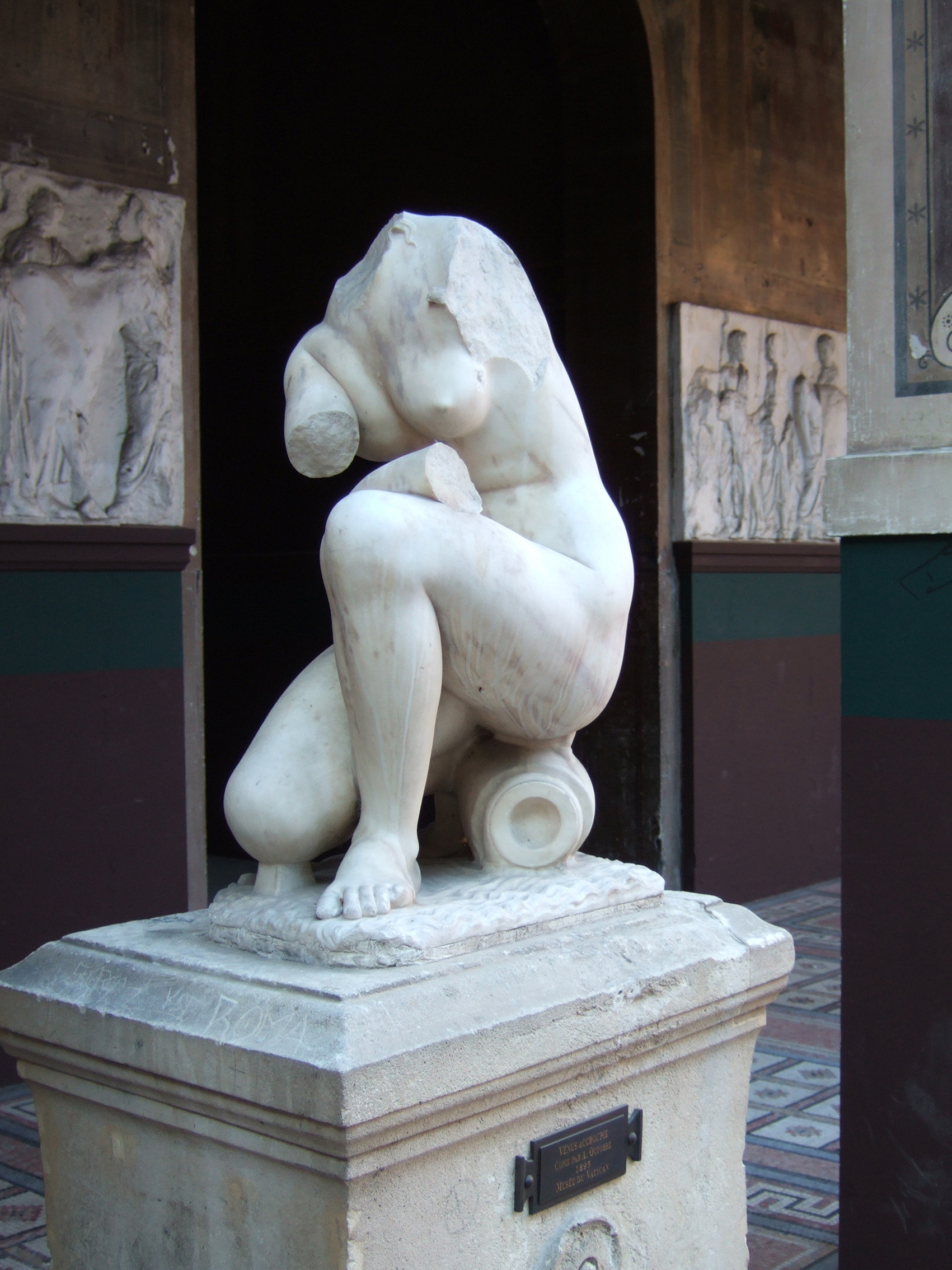
Cour du Mûrier, detail 7

== See also ==
- École des beaux-arts
- Académie de peinture et de sculpture
- Comité des Étudiants Américains de l'École des beaux-arts Paris
- Beaux-Arts architecture
- Academic art
- Hôtel de Chimay
- List of works by Henri Chapu
