= Paul-Henry Chombart de Lauwe =

French urban sociologist (1913–1998)

- Born: 4 August 1913; Cambrai, France
- Died: 11 January 1998 (aged 84); Antony, Hauts-de-Seine, France
- Education: École nationale supérieure des Beaux-Arts
- Occupations: Urban sociologist, writer, fighter pilot

Paul-Henry Chombart de Lauwe (4 August 1913, Cambrai – 11 January 1998, Antony), was a noted French urban sociologist. He was strongly influenced by the Chicago school and was an early advocate of participatory planning.

== Biography ==
In the 1930s, Paul-Henry Chombart de Lauwe studied sculpture and philosophy at the École des Beaux-Arts, where he also became interested in ethnology and sociology. After graduating in philosophy, he first worked in Cameroun, but in 1937 returned to France to absolve the compulsory military service. After the defeat of the French army in 1940, he first fled to North Africa but returned to France after the armistice, where he cooperated with the Resistance. In 1942 he fled again via Spain to North Africa, and joined the Allied air force as a fighter pilot.

The postwar housing shortage raised Chombart de Lauwe's interest in urban sociology. In 1950 he established the Groupe d'ethnologie sociale to study the social history of Paris. Based on this research, he proposed significant changes to the planning of Paris, including public access to the city's monuments, avoiding the segregation of residential and industrial land uses - a mantra of modernist urban planning at the time, and public engagement in urban renewal projects.

== Publications ==
- La découverte aérienne du monde, Horizon de France, Paris, 1948
- Paris et l'agglomération parisienne, Presses universitaires de France, Paris, 1952
- Des hommes et des villes, 1965
- Pour une sociologie des aspirations, 1969
- La Culture et le pouvoir, 1975
- La Fin des villes : mythe ou réalité ?, 1982
