= Jean-Luc Vilmouth =

French sculptor

Jean-Luc Vilmouth (5 March 1952 – 17 December 2015) was a French sculptor. He was born on 5 March 1952 at Creutzwald and died on the 19 December 2015 in Taipei. He taught at the École nationale supérieure des Beaux-Arts in Paris.

== Biography ==
Trained at the Fine Arts School in Metz, Vilmouth arrived in England in the 1970s where he immersed himself in the New English sculpture of Tony Cragg, Bill Woodrow and others. If minimalism and conceptual art will influence his early works Vilmouth will quickly focus his researches around everyday objects. Describing himself as "augmentateur" Jean-Luc Vilmouth seeks to supplement the object rather than transform it. Far from formalist concerns, he chose objects for their potential, their memory: "what interests me in the objects that surround us, is their origin, their design ... I think that an object can enable us to understand include a whole social evolution... ". Through sculptures, installations, videos and performances, Vilmouth questioned the relationship to the object and its place in the environment. Reporting the malfunctions of the world around him, he seeks to reinterpret everyday life to better challenge it. By the principle of diversion and scaling, he transcends mere objects of everyday life, by increasing its meaning and by engaging the viewer as an actor.

== Permanent installations (France) ==
=== Comme un noyau, un voyage de l’esprit, Saint-Vincent-les-Forts (2011) ===
Under the VIAPAC, Vilmouth installed a model of the Vauban Fort of Saint-Vincent-les-Forts on the access path to the site, facing the Fort . Unlike the building that suffered the marks of time, the model is an exhaustive representation, to the image of the original architecture. This device brings the visitor to perceive sculpture as the nucleus from which the fort was built. This is both a reflection on architecture and a working memory inciting the public to mentally reconstruct the architecture of the fort by operating a back and forth between two scales of perception: that of the miniature model and that of the monumental building .

=== Bar des plantes, Strasbourg (2006) ===
This was carried out for a public commission for the city of Strasbourg. It is a flower kiosk functioning like a greenhouse and in which different kinds of syrups from various plants can be tasted.

=== Comme deux tours, Châtellerault (1994) ===
As part of the redevelopment of the Weapons Manufacture of Châtellerault, Vilmouth created a work highlighting the site and its history. It is as a kind of an architectural metal graft that transforms two huge fireplaces in observation towers . 18 meters high gateways installed on these chimneys are made accessible by the spiral staircase situated where the old water tower used to be . On the Manufacture site stand two chimneys visible from most of the city . "Inversing the situation is to allow the viewer to show, is to allow the viewer to climb chimneys to watch the city. "'

=== Exhibitions ===
- 2007: Villa du Parc, Centre d’Art contemporain, Anemasse (France)
- 2006: The White Building, Galerie Anne Vidal, Paris
- 2005: Les visiteurs, carte blanche to Jean-Luc Vilmouth, Château de Carcassonne (France)
- 2004: Code Unknown, Palais de Tokyo, Paris (France)
- 2000: Elysian Fields, Centre national d'art et de culture Georges-Pompidou, Paris (France)
- 1999: Autour de l'arbre, Chateau de Bionnay Morgane Rousseau, (France)
- 1994: The winter of love, MoMA PS1, New-York (USA)
- 1991: Lyon Biennale(France)
- 1990: Empreinte de Siam, in collaboration with la Manufacture nationale de Sèvres.
- 1987: Local Time, le Magasin, centre national d’art contemporain, Grenoble (France)
