= Olivia Chaumont =

French architect, urban planner, and freemason

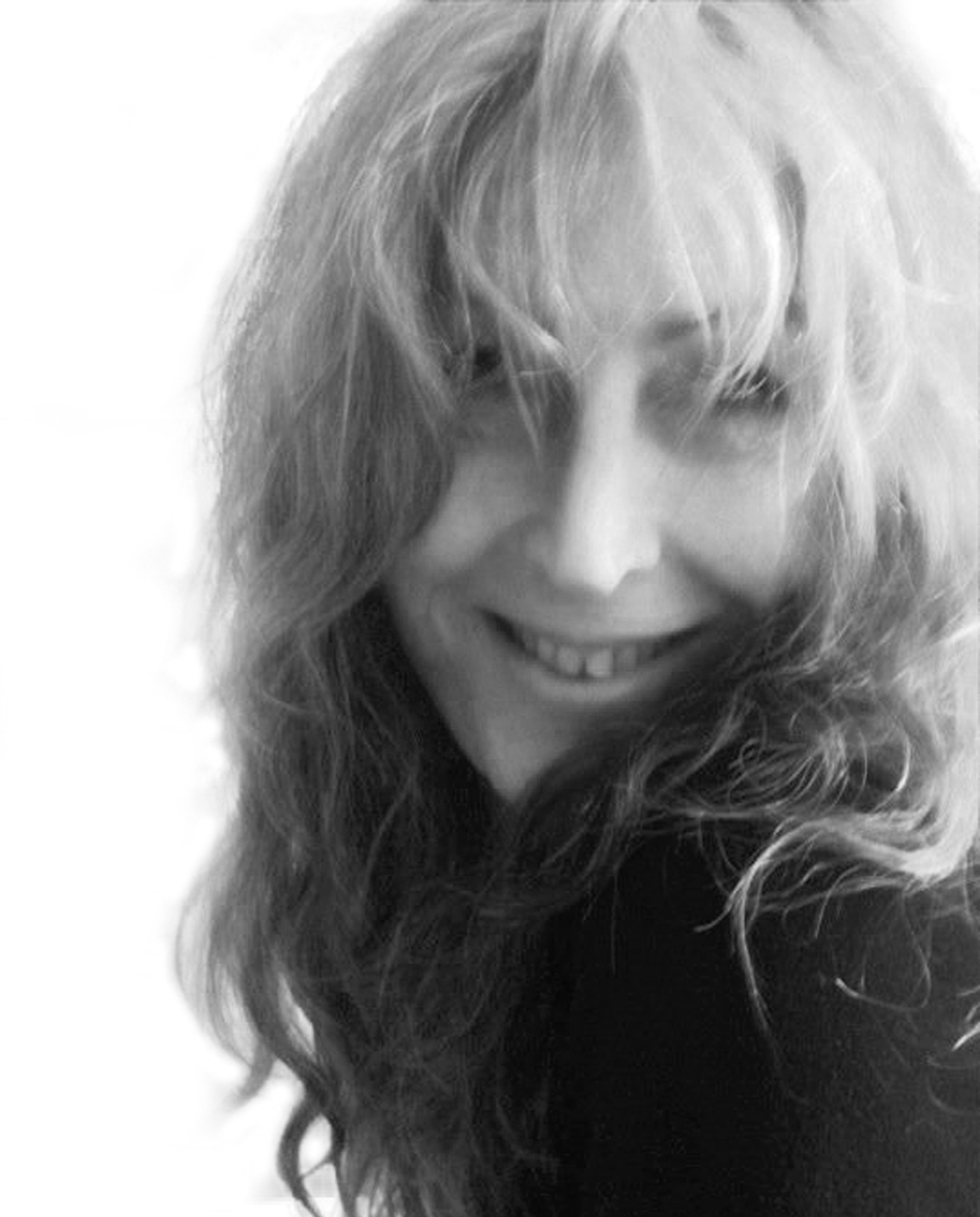
- Born: Olivier Chaumont; October 30, 1950 (age 75); Meudon, France
- Occupation: Architect

Olivia Chaumont (born October 30, 1950) is a French architect and transgender activist.

== Education ==
Chaumont graduated from the École nationale supérieure des Beaux-Arts in 1978. She completed training as an architect at the Institut d'urbanisme de Paris.

== Career ==
In 1981, Chaumont founded the Urbatecture agency, and, in 1991, the Atelier Cité architecture and urban planning agency, which she managed until 2008.

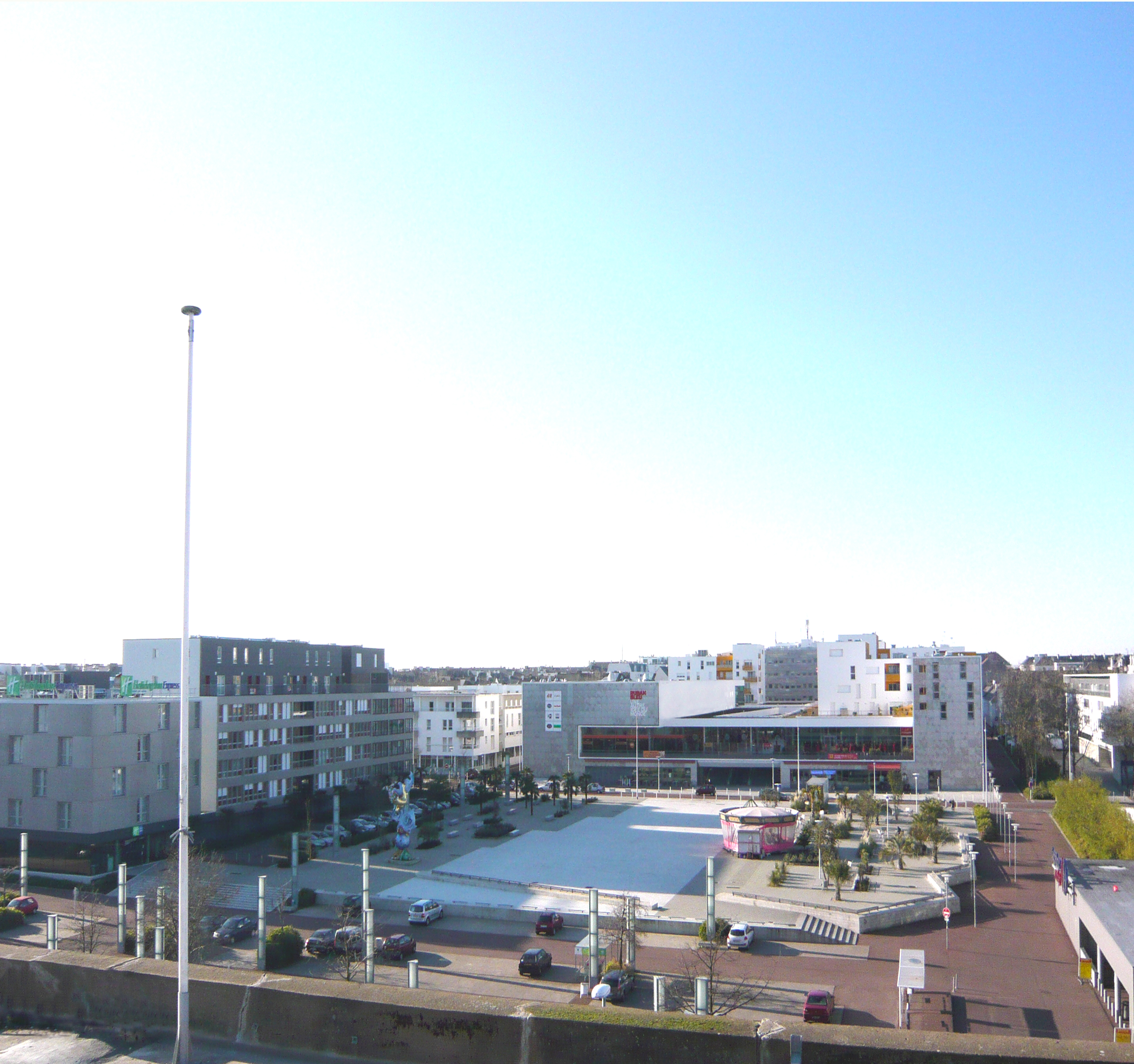
Ville-Port 2

In 1990, Chaumont was appointed as an expert by the state and Nord-Pas-de-Calais regional council for the reclamation of industrial wasteland. Throughout these years she led numerous architectural and urban planning projects. In 1990, she won the national competition "Pour une architecture de la réhabilitation" launched by the Ministry of Public Works for her project to rehabilitate the Montereau-Ruffins complex in Montreuil. The approach was based on the clarification of the statutes between private and public spaces and the affirmation of a new residential character. This achievement is an example in France and abroad for the way it reintegrates a large ensemble into the surrounding urban structure. In the same city, Chaumont was also the urban planner of the downtown development zone, a complex of 110 social housing units that dominates the town hall square.

In 2003, Chaumont was the winner of the Ville-Port 2 international competition in Saint-Nazaire.

== Transgender activism ==
In 2007, Chaumont travelled to Thailand where she completed sex reassignment surgery. She legally changed her civil status in 2010, and her social security number in 2011. She has since publicly spoken about her experience transitioning in many countries, including before the French National Assembly in 2011. She published a book about her experience in 2013 titled D'un corps à l'autre. Since 2016, she has been a programmer at the Chéries-Chéris LGBTQ film festival in Paris.

== Freemasonry ==
Chaumont has been a member of the Grand Orient de France Masonic organization since 1992. In 2007, she requested to be recognized by the organization as a female. In 2010, the Order's council voted to recognize her as such, and become the first trans woman recognized by the Order.
