= Beatrice Valentine Amrhein =

French artist

Béatrice Valentine Amrhein (born 1969 in Wassy) is a French artist. She lives and works in Paris.

== Biography ==
Amrhein was trained as a painter at l’École nationale supérieure des Beaux-Arts in Paris, at École nationale des beaux arts of Nancy and as a fashion designer at Parsons The New School for Design in New York.

Amrhein works in painting, drawing, sculpture, photography, video, multimedia, and installation. Her work has been exhibited at the Contemporary Museum in Baltimore, USA, in 2007; Herzliya Museum of Contemporary Art, Tel Aviv Herzliya; Palais de Tokyo, Paris; Convent of the Cordeliers, and Châteauroux in 2004..

Amrhein has held numerous solo exhibitions around the world. Some of her notable exhibitions are Paris-Texas (1992), Innocent Désire (1993), Hope (1994), and Prométhée (1995). Since 2000, she has exhibited regularly at Galerie Pascal Gabert, C. Downey, New York, Sara Gata Studio, New York, and Nancy Wine, Brooklyn, New York.
