= David Tai Bornoff =

American photographer, writer and filmmaker

David Tai Bornoff (born 1980, Chicago, Illinois) is an American writer, advertising director, photographer, film director and multimedia artist.

His work has been exhibited internationally and his writing featured in many fashion and music related magazines. His commercial editing work is extensive, including the first GMC commercial to ever air on the super bowl. He is responsible for editing the pop culture hit "ShamWow" directed by pitchman Vince Offer.

== Early years ==
Bornoff was born in 1980, the son of Denise and Jack Bornoff, both graduates of the School of the Art Institute of Chicago and early pioneers of the Chicago performance art movement. At the age of 5 the family moved to Los Angeles where from an early age his peers and mentors were skateboarders, graffiti writers, musicians, and artists that were considered to be on the fringes of society. He accepted an offer to complete high school at the Los Angeles County High School for the Arts where he took early classes in Computer graphics and became the youngest Graphics editor of the Association for Computing Machinery. David Tai Bornoff holds an undergraduate degree in Fine Arts from Otis College of Art and Design in Los Angeles, and a Post Diplome in Multimedia from The École nationale supérieure des Beaux-Arts in Paris.

== Advertising ==
David has won multiple Gold ADDY Awards for editing, directing, and his creative strategies. David is a board member of The Joint Photographic Experts Group (Jpeg), The Moving Picture Experts Group, and is an advisor to the Sacramento Film Commission.

== Art ==
- 2001 "Egofugal - Fugue from Ego for the Next Emergence" - Istanbul Biennial, with Seza Paker, curated by Yuko Hasegawa

== Writing ==
- Frank151 - Multiple Issues
- Featured in Modern Painter Magazine
- Featured in Nylon Magazine
- Featured on Gawker
- "The New Dark Ages" by Justin Blyth
- "One Thousand Years This Was a Glacier" (to be published in 2012 by Reserve)

== Links ==
- Frank151, Bar & Grill - Words and photos: David Tai Bornoff
- Intranet, otis.edu
- Profile, imdb.com
