= Charles Burki =

Dutch illustrator (1909–1994)

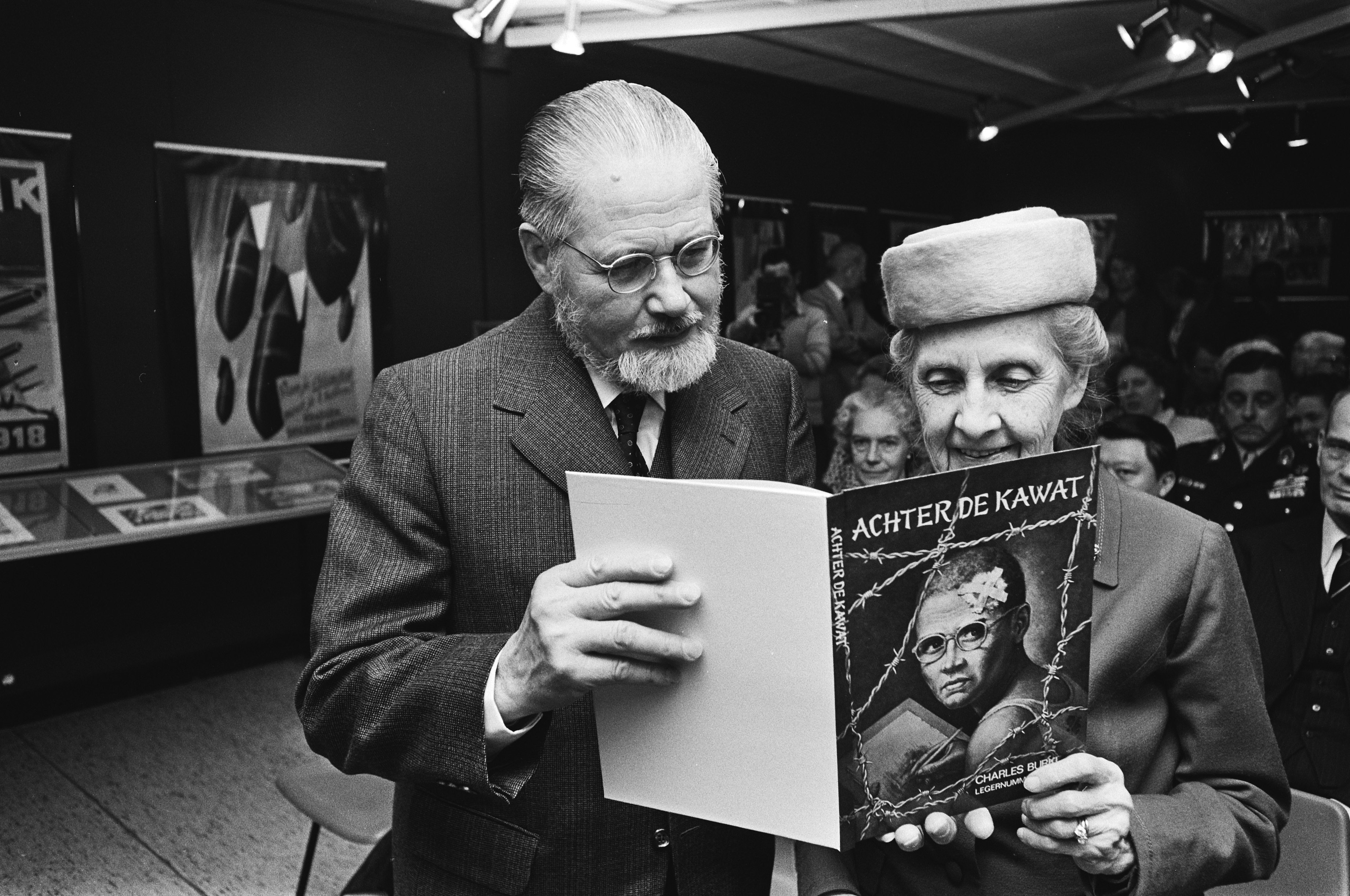
- Burki offers the first copy of Achter de Kawat to Mrs. Tjarda van Starkenborgh Stachouwer (1979)
- Born: 4 May 1909; Magelang
- Died: 28 April 1994 (aged 84); The Hague
- Occupations: Illustrator, drawer, cartoonist, watercolorist, modeler, industrial designer, advertising illustrator, painter, modeler, publicity graphist, soldier
- Notable work: Achter de Kawat
- Spouse: Sophia Burki-Hogendoorn

Charles Burki (1909–1994) was a Dutch illustrator and motorcycle enthusiast, born and raised in colonial Indonesia (the Dutch East Indies) and educated at the Ecole des Beaux-Arts, Paris. He worked extensively for DAF trucks, Shell, Philips, KLM, Goodyear, and for such magazines as Motor, Moto Revue, Sport in Beeld. During WWII, Burki was interned in a Japanese POW camp and managed to record the experience. The drawings were subsequently published in his book Behind Barbed Wire (Dutch: Achter de Kawat). Burki returned to the Netherlands in 1945 and lived in the Hague until his death in 1994. His work has been commemorated in exhibitions, postcards, and postal stamps.
