= Liliana Gramberg =

Italian-American printmaker and painter

- Born: Liliana Muzzolini; July 8, 1921; Treviso, Italy
- Died: March 21, 1996 (aged 74); Washington, D.C., U.S.

Liliana Gramberg (July 8, 1921 – March 21, 1996) was an Italian-born American printmaker and painter.

== Life and career ==
Gramberg was born Treviso, Italy, in July 1921. She attended the University of Rome, before moving to California in 1950 on a Fulbright scholarship, at the California College of Arts and Crafts. Gramberg also studied at the École nationale supérieure des beaux-arts in Paris. She was known for her abstract work in printmaking which she also taught at Trinity College in Washington, D.C. She organized exhibitions of the art of Martin Puryear and Sam Gilliam at Trinity College. Gramberg died in Washington, D.C., on March 21, 1996, at the age of 74.

== Collections ==
- Ashmolean Museum of Art
- British Museum
- Library of Congress
- Museo Reina Sofia
- Smithsonian American Art Museum
- National Gallery of Australia
