= Lucien Georges Bazor =

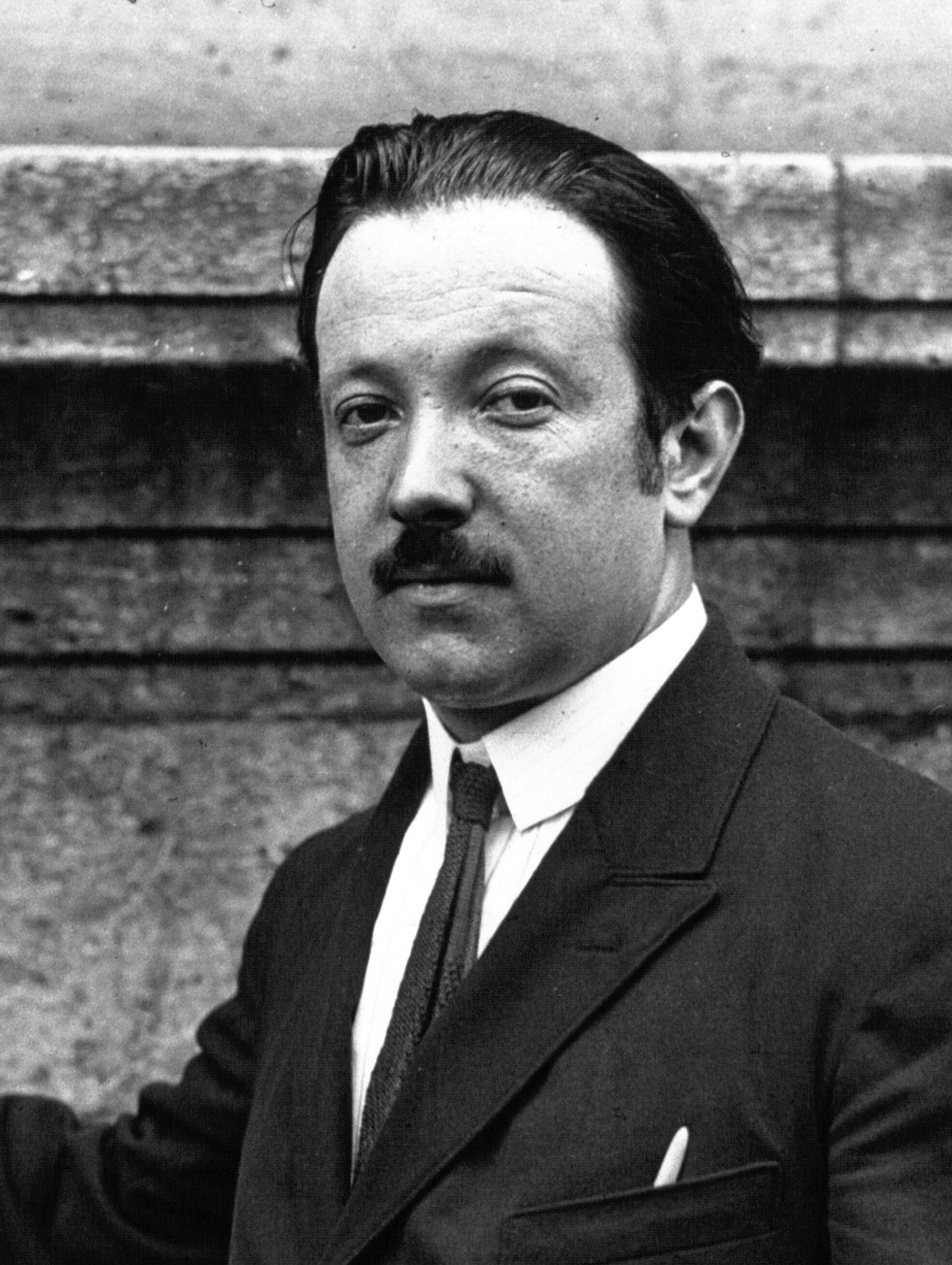
Lucien Bazor in 1923

Lucien Georges Bazor (1889–1974) was Chief Engraver at the Paris mint from 1930 to 1958. He was born in Paris in 1889 and initially studied under his father, Albert Bazor. Bazor later became the pupil of Patey at the École nationale supérieure des Beaux-Arts. He won the Grand Prix de Rome in 1923 for his engraving.

Bazor is best known for his design of the 5 franc piece 1933, known at the time as the "Bedoucette" (after the contemporary Minister of Finance), now known as "Bazor". This smallish copper-nickel coin was generally rejected by the French public as too far away from the previous, large silver pieces. It was quickly replaced by the much larger and twice as heavy 5 francs Lavrillier. His 100 franc pieces 1929–1936 did not circulate, but were used as a convenient way to hoard gold. He also designed controversial pieces for Vichy France: 1 franc 1942 and 1943–1944 and 2 francs 1943–1944 with the double-edged Francisque and 5 francs with Marshal Philippe Pétain. The latter did not circulate as most copies produced were lost due to Allied bombing.

Bazor also designed French colonial coins for

- Cambodia: 10, 20 and 50 Cents 1953, 1959
- French Equatorial Africa: 1, 2 francs 1948
- French Oceania: 50 centimes, 1, 2, 5 francs 1949, 1952
- French Somaliland: 1, 2, 5, 10, 20 francs 1948, 1949
- French West Africa: 1, 2 francs 1948, 1955, 5, 10 francs 1956, 10, 25 francs 1957
- Laos: 10, 20, 50 cents 1952
- Madagascar: 1, 2, 5 francs 1948, 1958, 10, 20 francs 1953
- New Caledonia: 50 centimes, 1, 2 francs 1949, 5 francs 1952
- Réunion: 1, 2, 5 francs 1948, 10, 20 francs 1955
- Saint Pierre et Miquelon: 1, 2 francs 1948
- Vietnam: 10, 20, 50 su 1953

Some of his designs continued to be used until well in the 1970s, but after 1958, they were combined with the owl mark for his successor, Raymond Joly. In addition, Bazor made a large number of patterns. Bazor's antelope design is still used on West African five franc coins to this day.

Lucien Bazor died in 1974. He was buried in Châtenay-Malabry (Hauts de Seine). His grave is decorated with a portrait medal designed by Robert Cochet (1903–1988).
