= Indira Nair =

Indian Canadian painter (1938–2018)

Indira Nair (1938, in Guruvayur – 2018, in Val-David) was an Indian Canadian painter, printmaker, and sculptor, who specialised in acrylic painting. Educated in Mumbai, at the Sorbonne at the Beaux-Arts de Paris, and at the Université du Québec à Montréal, her works are in the collections of the Montreal Museum of Fine Arts, the Musée national des beaux-arts du Québec, and the Musée d'art contemporain de Montréal.
