= Robert Jay Wolff =

American abstract painter

Robert Jay Wolff (1905–1978) was an early pioneer of the American abstract art. His paintings are in the collections of the Brooklyn Museum and the Guggenheim.

Born in Chicago, Illinois, he attended Yale University and the Ecole Des Beaux Arts in France. An educator as well as an artist, Wolff was a professor of art at the Chicago Institute of Design (originally the New Bauhaus, now the IIT Institute of Design), before moving to Brooklyn College where he was chairman of the department from 1946 to 1964. He has written numerous articles on art and is the author-designer of the widely known educational portfolio Elements of Design, published by the Museum of Modern Art. He also wrote at least three children's books about color.

Robert Jay Wolff's formal art training began with night school at the Chicago Art Institute in 1928 and ended with a few months in the sculpture atelier of the French academician Henri Bouchard at the Ecole des Beaux Arts in Paris in 1930. Remaining in Paris, Wolff worked independently: "My masters were the stone cutters of archaic Greece. The bronze sculptures of Charles Despiau seemed to me the only contemporary works that could approach the purity and grandeur of the stone figures of the Sixth Century B.C.," he recalled. "Much of my time, when not working, was spent in the far corner of the basement of the Louvre surrounded by ancient Greece."

Paris in 1929 and 1930 was alive with the new art of the School of Paris, and Wolff saw paintings by Joan Miro, Henri Matisse, Pablo Picasso, and Georges Braque and the sculpture of Brancusi, Zadkine, Gonzales, Archipenko. "They all held an inescapable fascination for young and uncommitted eyes," he wrote years later. Wolff returned to Chicago in 1932, where he continued to work in sculpture. "I worked always from life, mostly heads; and though a certain likeness always resulted my first concern was with the sculpture as an object, as a fully realized volume of planes intersecting planes, of an infinite diversity of contours, of surfaces patiently growing to the fullness of a living essence.

Wolff spent hours drawing. "My studio in Chicago was a seventh-floor loft in an old building on Wacker Drive at Wabash Avenue. My windows faced west, and looked down on the busy Chicago River. The river stretched out before me, its bridges one after the other rising and descending with the coming and going of boats and ships of all kinds, large and small. The tall buildings of the Loop towered over me to the south while across the river to the north and west there was the contrast of dingy old warehouses and wharfs." "Between 1929 and 1931 I had done a series of wash drawings from my window high up in Passy overlooking Paris and it was in these that I discovered how the aggressive tangibility of spaces could dissolve the concrete object world." Wolff's sculpture received prizes in juried shows at the Chicago Art Institute in 1933 and 1934, and in a one-man exhibition in 1935. But the artist was already turning from sculpture toward painting, what he called, "exciting but, in a sense, terrifying excursions into this new and strange realm of subjectively expressive abstraction."

From 1936 on Wolff expressed himself in abstract painting: "Spaces of magic light and vivid color, emptied of fixed points of reference, of self-enclosed objects and locally isolated things, color spaces containing only the heavy black lines of brush strokes that defined their limits; this was what emerged....with a kind of furious aimlessness. I was not sure what it was that was happening, but I knew that what ever it was it was vividly alive. This was the here and now of my life. I had taken the long, final step out of the shelter of art history and I found that I was quite alone." Wolff became a member of Abstract American Artists in 1937 and exhibited with the group.

Wolff joined with Laszlo Moholy-Nagy and Gyorgy Kepes in 1938 when they established the Chicago Institute of Design, the American revival of the German Bauhaus school. After World War II Wolff was professor of Art at Brooklyn College, where as department chairman his faculty included Ad Reinhardt, Burgoyne Diller, Stanley Hayter, Carl Holty and Mark Rothko. Wolff's book Essays on Art and Learning, was published in 1971.

Wolff's work is represented in collections including: Art Institute of Chicago, Brooklyn Museum of Art, estate of Alexander Calder, estate of Marcel Breuer, The Guggenheim, Rhode Island School of Design Museum, the Tate in London, and the Wadsworth Athenaeum.
