= JOB Collection =

Collection of adverts for rolling papers

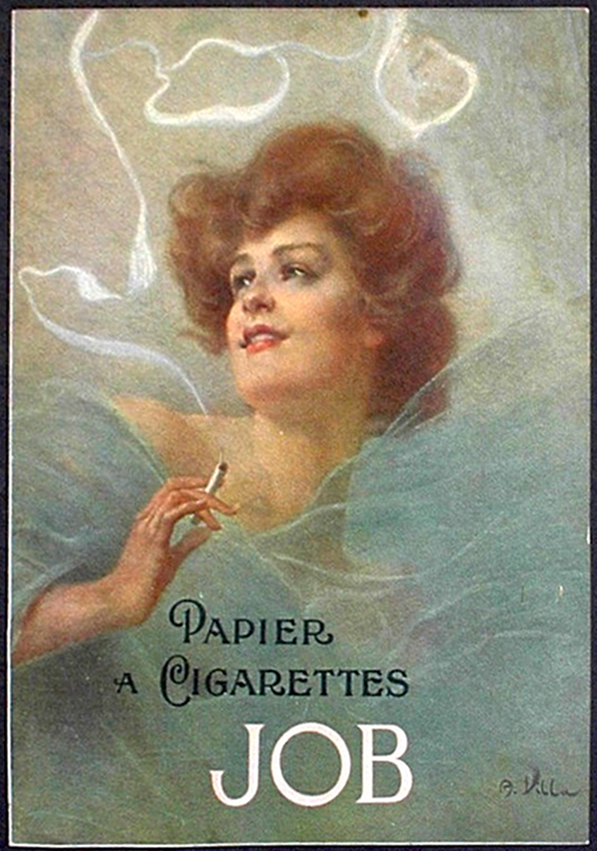
1907 Aleardo Villa calendar.

The JOB collection is a production of graphic works consisting of calendars, posters and postcards advertising the JOB rolling paper factory. Artistic in character, it was illustrated by renowned painters and poster artists, mainly during the Art Nouveau period.

The owners of the JOB brand, grandchildren and allies of founder Jean Bardou, were industrialists and patrons of the arts. From 1895 until the Great War they enlisted the help of numerous artists, often their close friends, to advertise cigarette paper. Painters and illustrators representing the main artistic currents of the time, from academic painter Paul Jean Gervais to Catalan Modernist Ramon Casas, from orientalist Georges Rochegrosse to Montmartre humorist Charles Léandre, as well as Jane Atché, all contributed. This collection of 32 works became known to the general public through calendar and poster prints, and was widely distributed as postcards in France and abroad. Alphonse Mucha's two most famous productions, La femme blonde and La femme brune, were a huge success and are still highly sought after by collectors today.

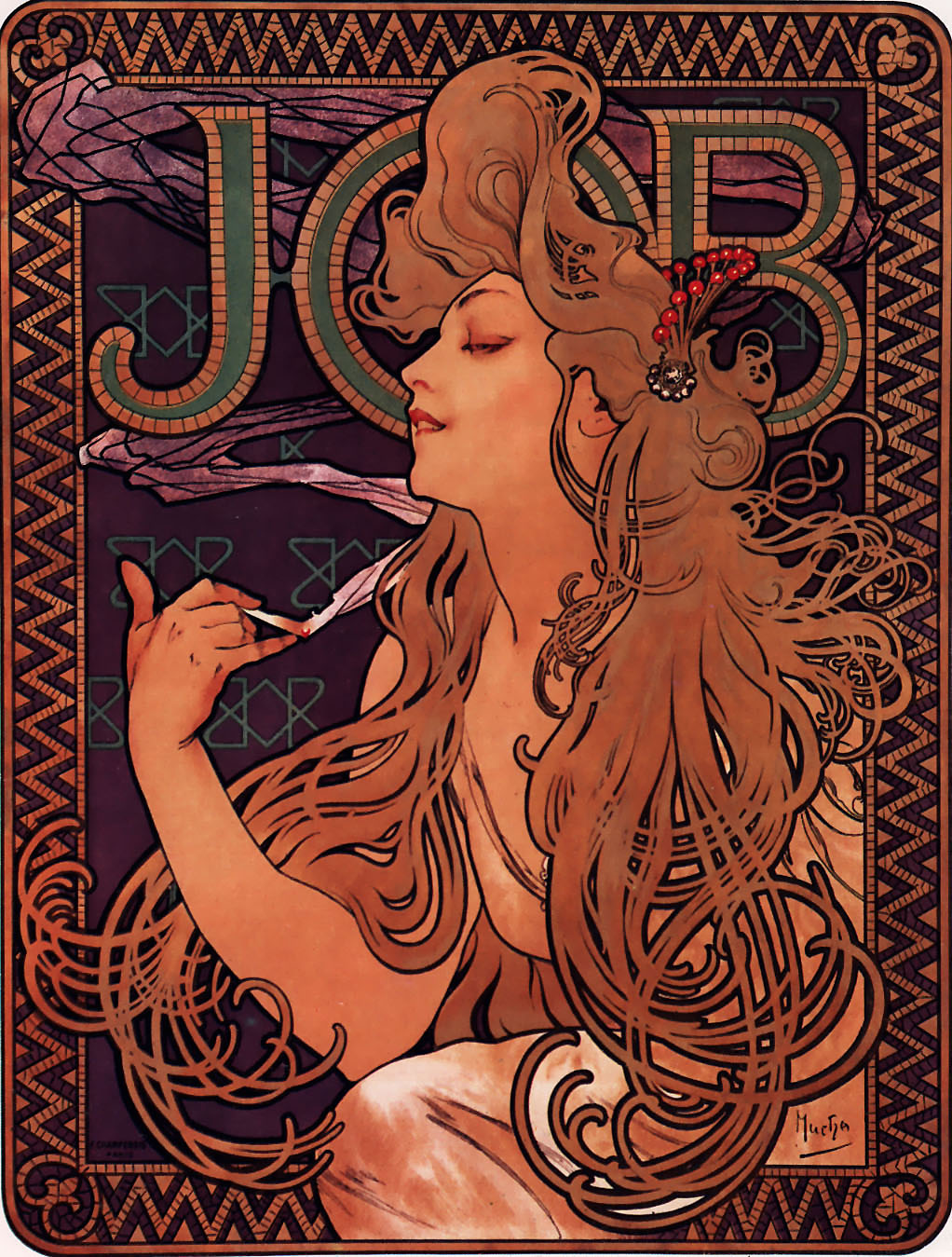
1897 calendar. La femme blonde, Alphonse Mucha.

Alongside this well-referenced production, other works do not benefit from the widespread distribution offered by the postcard, either because they remained at the sketch stage, such as the soldiers imagined by Henri de Toulouse-Lautrec, or because they were only the subject of rare posters, such as the Spanish ones by Gaspar Camps. Recent biographies of the artists and the poster collections held in museums allow us to attempt to reconstruct the completeness of the collection up to the 1920s, when creation became very sporadic. Later, artists influenced by JOB and Art Nouveau revived certain posters. In the 1960s, a JOB poster by Mucha was reinterpreted with a psychedelic effect, and in 2008, Stuck artist Paul Harvey proposed a new version of the brand's advertising posters.

The JOB collection is a significant example of the "marriage of Art and Industry", one of the foundations of Art Nouveau, in the field of graphic arts.

== JOB, advertising and Art Nouveau artistic creation ==
=== Advertising and Art Nouveau ===
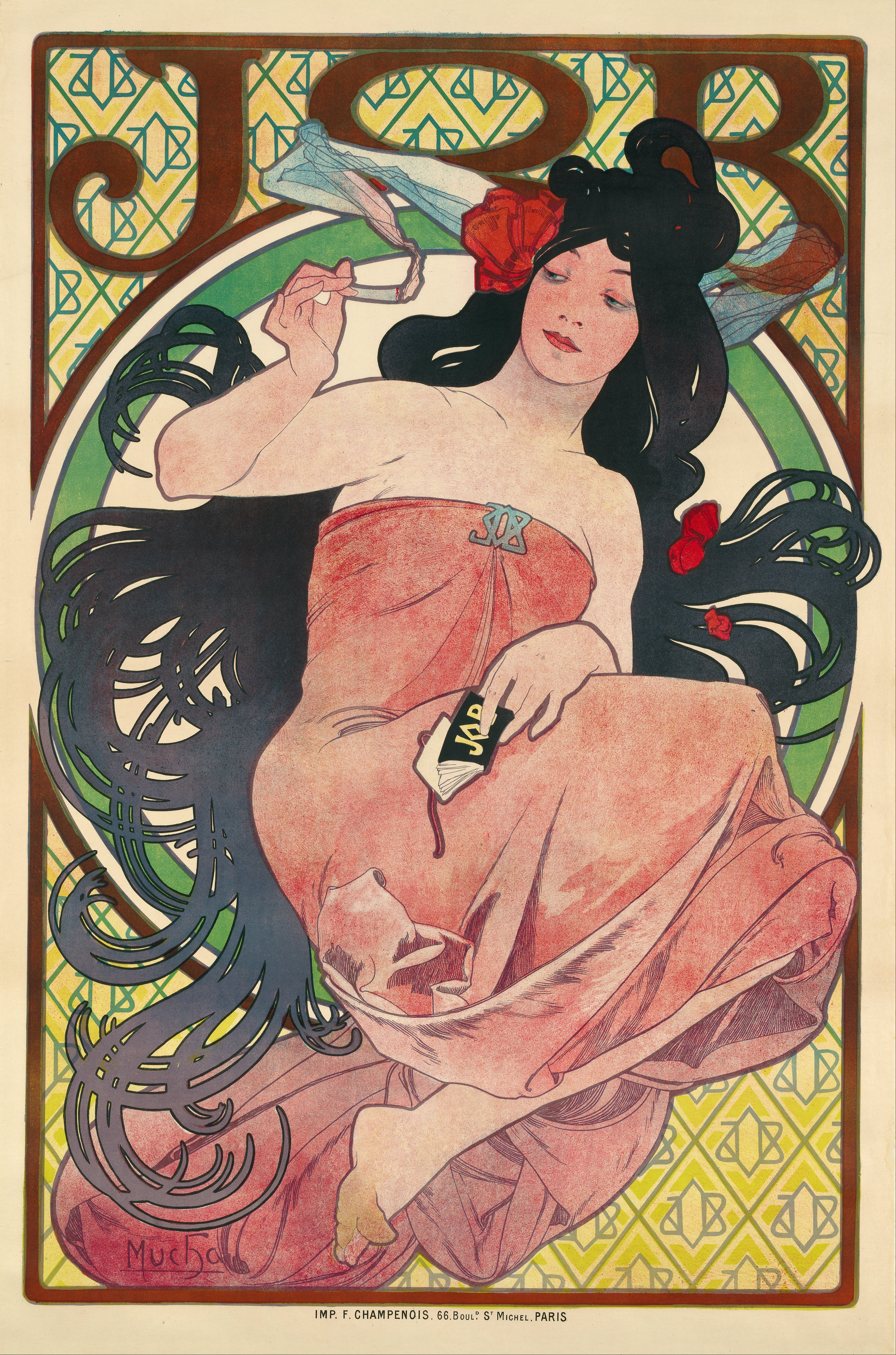
1898 poster. La femme brune, Alphonse Mucha.

Around 1900 Art Nouveau and postcards were at their peak. It was a period of fundamental renewal for the arts; nature and the flower-woman were, like Japonisme, a source of inspiration for artists.

Painters, even the glories of academicism, were not reluctant to take part in the many poster and postcard competitions that were published in large numbers: Lefèvre-Utile, La Meuse, Nestlé, Byrrh... Thousands of posters of cartoonist Jules Chéret's famous Chérette, ancestor of the Pin-up, covered the walls of Paris, paving the way for Alphonse Mucha and the many painters whose main source of inspiration was women.

Based on artists' designs, printers used the chromolithography reproduction process, a four-color printing technique developed in 1839 by Godefroy Engelmann. The use of the three primary colors (blue, yellow, red), to which black is added, makes it possible to obtain all possible shades and nuances.

Thanks to this collaboration Art Nouveau was democratized through small-format reproductions on paper, and entered every household. Artistic advertising and postcards illustrated the vocation of Art Nouveau, intended as "art for all" and a marriage of Art and Industry. Even if, for Paul Éluard, they represented only "the small currency of art", they "sometimes give the idea of gold".

=== Bardou family, industrialists and sponsors ===
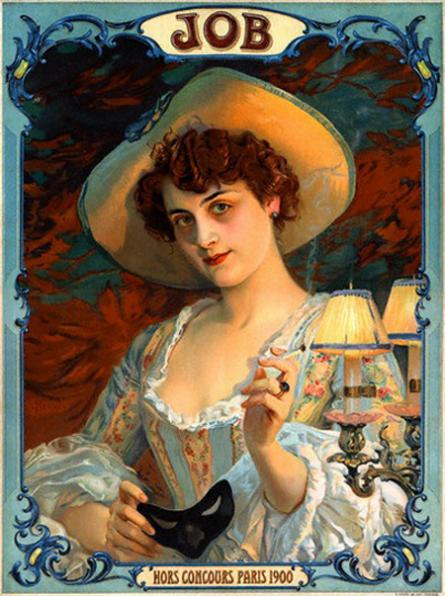
1904 Paul Gervais calendar

Products such as cigarette rolling papers were promoted through advertising and catchwords: people bought what they saw, better than what they thought they saw. Such was the case with advertisements for the Bardou family's JOB cigarette paper.

In the second half of the 19th century Pierre Bardou-Job turned the cigarette-paper manufacturing workshops created by his father Jean Bardou into a large-scale factory. A wealthy industrialist and sponsor of the arts, part of his estate consisted of art collections. After his death in 1892, his three children, Camille, Justin and Jeanne, formed the Pierre Bardou-Job company in memory of their father. It was formed by Justin Bardou-Job, Charles Ducup de St Paul, Camille's husband, and Jules Pams, Jeanne's husband. As evidence of this period, there is a gouache advertising project by Alfons Mucha showing a variant of La Femme Blonde, dressed in blue on a black background, with the word JOB inscribed in red in the background. Above the drawing is the name Pierre Bardou-Job, the address of the Perpignan head office and below that of a Toulouse operator.

The Bardou family and their allies, in particular the Pams and Ducup de Saint Paul families, were astute industrialists but also patrons of the arts with refined tastes, asking their artist friends to illustrate the cigarette paper company's products with advertisements. Relations between this family and renowned painters were close: Georges de Feure spent his vacations with the Bardou-Pams family, and Paul Jean Gervais and Alphonse Mucha were close friends. What's more, Edgar Maxence's 1901 calendar, La femme rousse à l'orchidée, a Symbolist painting whose original is in the Musée d'Orsay, is a portrait of Pierre Job-Bardou's daughter Jeanne.

In addition to Bouisset, Meunier, Chéret, and the already famous Mucha, they were able to enlist the help of numerous artists. In all some 30 painters and designers of first or second rank collaborated on the brand's advertising creations between 1895 and 1925.

=== JOB Art Nouveau Collection ===
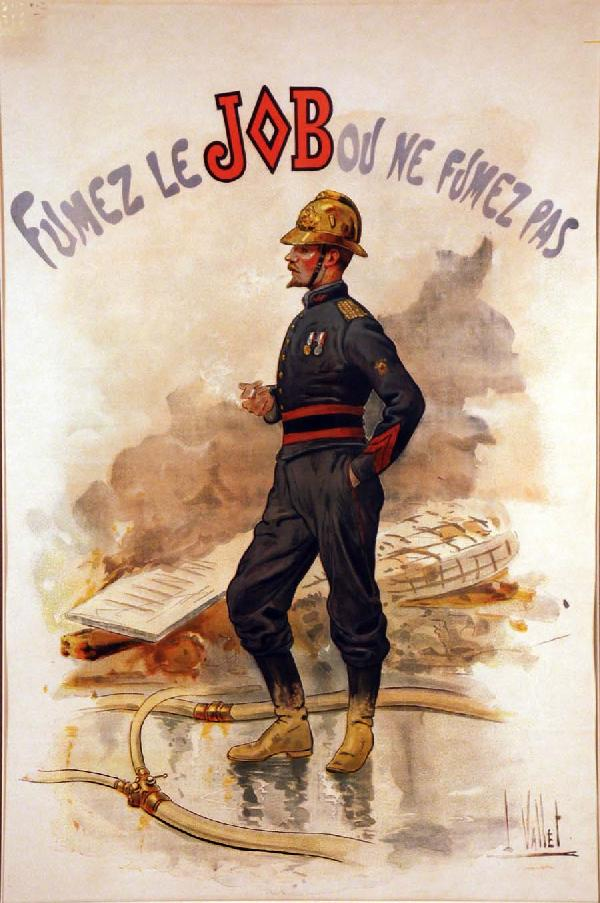
1900 Louis Vallet poster.

Thanks to Art Nouveau art magazines, fairs and, above all, the many poster competitions, the artists became better known and commissions were received. In 1896, for example, a major exhibition of French and foreign posters was held in Reims, attended by the leading illustrators of the day. The 202-page catalog announced "a description of the 1,690 most beautiful posters (...) and portraits of 48 of the leading artists". Indeed, Alphonse Mucha worked alongside the young Jane Atché, Firmin Bouisset and Henri de Toulouse-Lautrec. The latter's project was not retained, while Jane Atché's was taken over by the JOB company with a few modifications.

Between 1895 and 1916 thirty-two works, including those reproduced on postcards, were signed by the greatest names of the time. Most often published as calendars, they were reproduced on postcards from 1903, given their success, and were sold or given as end-of-year gifts to the brand's factory workers. Mucha's La Femme Blonde (1896) was a huge success, sold as a popular edition at 3 francs and as a deluxe edition. In addition to the paper prints, the illustrations were reproduced on various supports, such as tobacco or cigarette boxes in lithographed sheet metal. In addition to these 32 well-referenced pieces, there are some fifteen other creations, curiously under-referenced, such as the poster by Louis Vallet (circa 1900), the poster by Manuel Orazi (circa 1900) and at least two posters by Gaspar Camps (circa 1915), to name but a few well-known artists.

The recurring theme of the collection was women, often with cigarette in hand, whose wisps of smoke or background indicated that "she was smoking with JOB". The woman who smoked was certainly a liberated woman, but in the conservative society of the time it was not a sign of class. In his book France fin de siècle, Eugen Weber wrote that "women who smoked were low-class women or criminals", and in the 1890s, respectable women who smoked were considered "either eccentrics or feminists demanding gender equality". While Mucha's La Femme Blonde echoed this stereotype of a scatterbrained, half-closed-eyed woman intoxicated by frivolous pleasures, Jane Atché is considered one of the first artists to portray the JOB-smoking woman in a positive light, rather than as a light-hearted woman paving the way for many other female conquests.

== Illustrators ==
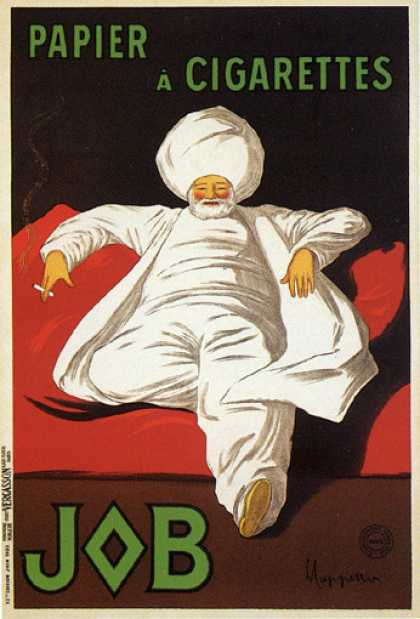
1914 Leonetto Cappiello poster.

Often scrupulously preserved in attics after the ephemeris had been used, calendars were forgotten after the war when fashions changed and past tragedies were erased from memory. Abandoned and often destroyed, some of them are now reappearing, in more or less good condition, for a second life. Sometimes, entire stacks are found in the stocks of former dealers. As skilled salesmen who were able to convince the customer that a print run of several thousand copies was "only slightly more expensive" than the one required, the representatives of the poster companies also unwittingly contributed to the longevity of the work. Throughout this time, it is also thanks to the many collectors trying to reconstitute the JOB collection that the memory has been preserved, all the more so as the cards generally bear the references of the calendar or poster they reproduce. So, for the most part, the memory has been preserved.

Famous painters and designers who contributed to the JOB collection:

- Jane Atché
- Firmin Bouisset
- Gaspar Camps
- Leonetto Cappiello
- Ramon Casas
- Jules Chéret,
- Paul Jean Gervais
- Daniel Hernández
- Charles Léandre
- Edgar Maxence
- Alfons Mucha
- Armand Rassenfosse
- Georges-Antoine Rochegrosse
- Louis Vallet

Not to forget the unpublished projects: Soldat fumant sa pipe by Henri de Toulouse-Lautrec and a series of four smoking women by Georges de Feure.

Alongside these big names, other illustrators also contributed to the production of the collection:

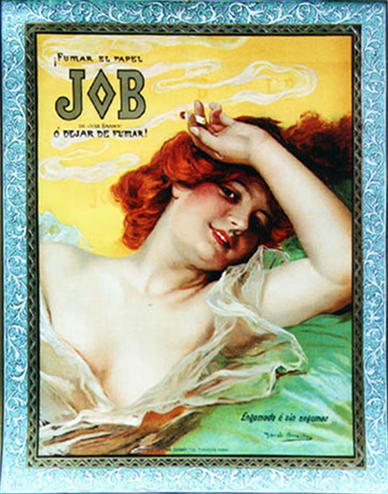
1898 Daniel Hernández Calendar

- Angelo Asti (1847–1903), French school. Of Italian descent, born in Paris, where he produced most of his work. A genre and portrait painter, he exhibited regularly at the Salon from 1890 onwards. While he is best known for his paintings of women in dreamy or glamorous poses, he is even better known to cartophiles for his enormous output of postcards.
- Julien Duvocelle (1873–1961), French school. He exhibited regularly at the Salon from 1897 onwards, winning awards including a bronze medal at the 1900 Universal Exhibition. A portrait painter, his contribution as a poster artist and postcard illustrator is less well known.
- Lluís Graner (1863–1929), Spanish school. This painter is known for his drawings and poster illustrations. A member of the Société Nationale des Beaux-Arts, he won a prize at the 1889 Universal Exhibition. His works are exhibited at the National Art Museum of Catalonia.
- Joseph Granié (1866–1915), French school. A student of Jean-Léon Gérôme, this painter began his career in Toulouse before moving to Paris. A talented artist, he distinguished himself by the eclecticism of his work. He exhibited a variety of subjects several times at the Salon des artistes français. Museums in Toulouse and Paris have preserved some of his works, such as Portrait d'Yvette Guilbert (Musée d'Orsay).
- Gabriel Hervé (1868–?), French school. Born in Charente, France, he was a portrait and genre painter. From 1903, he was a member of the Société des Artistes Français.
- André Joyeux (1871–1929), French school. A former student at the École nationale supérieure des Beaux-Arts in Paris, he moved to Cochinchina around 1900. In 1906, he exhibited paintings for the Tonkin pavilion at the Marseille colonial exhibition. He became the first teacher and director of the Gia Định School of Applied Arts (Trường Mỹ nghệ thực hành Gia Định) founded in 1913 on the outskirts of Saigon. He was a painter and illustrator of books on colonial life such as Silhouettes Saigonnaises (Saigon, 1909), La Vie des grandes colonies (Paris: Maurice Bauche, 1912), among others.
- Eugène Loup (1867–1948), French school. This Aveyron painter is known for his grisaille figures. He exhibited at the Salon des artistes français and the Société Nationale des Beaux-Arts. He was awarded a medal at the 1900 Universal Exhibition.
- Georges Meunier (1869–1942), French school. A Parisian painter, draftsman, lithographer and poster artist, he was a pupil of William Bouguereau at Beaux Arts de Paris. He published vignettes in the humor magazines of the day, such as Le Rire and L'Assiette au Beurre, and was a regular participant in the Salon des Humoristes (Humorists Show). Influenced by Jules Chéret, he produced a large number of posters, notably for the artistic printing house Chaix. In addition to his work for JOB, he participated in the major advertising series of the period (Byrrh collection, album for Mariani wine) and for the Collection des cent.
- Manuel Orazi (1860–1934) Italian school. Illustrator and poster artist in the Art Nouveau style, whose biography is still little studied. He produced scores for Ricordi in Milan. In France, in 1896, he exhibited a lithograph and a magic calendar at Samuel Bing's Maison de l'Art Nouveau, a curious esoteric work written in 1895 by Augustin de Croze, illustrated by Orazi and published in 777 copies. He illustrated numerous books for Edgar Allan Poe, Charles Baudelaire and Oscar Wilde, among others. His poster work included an advertising poster for La maison moderne. He was a member of the Société Nationale des Beaux-Arts.
- Jean de Paleologu known as PAL (1855–1942, dates uncertain), painter, illustrator and poster artist. After studying art in Paris and London, he was active in France and the United States. In Paris, he produced numerous posters and contributed to Belle Époque humor and art magazines such as Le Rire, La Plume, Cocorico and Le Frou-Frou. He illustrated Petits poèmes russes by Catulle Mendès, a collection published by Editions Charpentier in 1893. He moved to the United States in 1900.
- Aleardo Villa (1865-1906), Italian school. This Milanese painter was a representative of the liberty style, the Italian version of Art Nouveau. Initially a painter of religious subjects, he resolutely embarked on the path of poster and advertising art. As early as 1889, he was one of the first to produce postcards in Italy for the Ricordi house, as well as various Art Nouveau posters.

Other illustrators include Cyprien Boulez, a portrait painter; Nguyen Duc Thuc; G. Maurice, possibly a pseudonym; and Félix Thuillière, a French military painter and academy officer who died in Toulouse in 1926.

== Artworks ==
=== Table of series ===
Table of series of the JOB collection -Art Nouveau period-.
JOB collection composition					Postcard print, series of:					
Year	Illustrator	Theme	Calendar	Poster	1903	1910 (A)	1910 (B)	1911	1914	1916
1895	Étienne Firmin Bouisset	Le jeune ramoneur (The young chimney sweeper), "out of competition, Paris 1889"								
1895	Georges Meunier	Femme au chat (woman with cat), "out of competition, Paris 1889"								
1896	Jules Chéret	La Cherette, "out of competition, Paris 1889"								
1897	Alfons Mucha	La Femme blonde, (The blonde woman)								
1897	Jane Atché	Femme en vert et noir (Woman in green and black), "out of competition, Paris 1889"								
1897	G. Maurice	Femme sur fond rouge (Woman on red background), "out of competition, Paris 1889"								
1898	Lluís Graner	Vieillard à la lampe (Old man with a lamp)								
1898	Daniel Hernández	Femme au coussin vert (Woman with green cushion)								
1898	Alfons Mucha	La Femme brune (The Brunette woman)								
1899	Angelo Asti	Femme avec fleurs dans les cheveux (Woman with flowers in her hair), "out of competition, Paris 1889"								
1900	Charles Léandre	Femme rousse (Red-haired woman)								
1901	Edgar Maxence	Femme rousse à l'orchidée (Red-haired woman with orchid)								
1902	Paul Jean Gervais	Femme au bouquet de fleurs (Woman with a bouquet of flowers)								
1903	Edgar Maxence	Femme en barque (Woman in a boat), "out of competition, Paris 1900"								
1904	Paul Jean Gervais	Femme au masque (Woman with a mask), "out of competition, Paris 1900"								
1905	Paul Jean Gervais	Femme en jaune (Woman in yellow)								
1905	Edgar Maxence	Femme au figuier de Barbarie (Woman with prickly pear), "out of competition, Paris 1900"								
1906	Ramon Casas	Espagnole au gilet noir (Spanish girl in black vest), "out of competition, Paris 1900"								
1906	Julien Duvocelle	Femme fond marron (Woman on brown background)								
1907	Aleardo Villa	Femme au voile bleu (Woman with blue veil)								
1908	Georges-Antoine Rochegrosse	Femme à la guirlande de fleurs (Woman with flower garland)								
1909	Paul Jean Gervais	Femme avec bouquet à la main (Woman with bouquet in hand)								
1910	Paul Jean Gervais	Femme à la mantille noire (Woman with black mantilla)								
1910	Armand Rassenfosse	Gitane (Gypsy)								
1911	Paul Jean Gervais	Femme au vase (Woman with vase)								
1912	Paul Jean Gervais	Femme sur fond aquatique (Woman on an aquatic background)								
1913	Joseph Granié	Femme au chapeau à plumes (Woman with feathered hat)								
1914	Leonetto Cappiello	Le pacha								
1914	Nguyen Duc Thuc	Chinese scene, la grande marque française JOB (the great French brand JOB)								
1914	Georges-Antoine Rochegrosse	Orientale au diadème (Oriental with tiara)								
1915	Gabriel Hervé	Femme à la jaquette rouge (Woman in a red jacket)								
1916	Eugène Loup	Portrait de femme sur fond marron (Portrait of a woman on a brown background)								

Key for reading the table
calendar	poster	postcard	meaning	note
			Work originally published as a calendar	No poster print run or print run still unknown
			Work originally published as a poster	
			Work originally published as a calendar and poster	Note a large reprint of Cappiello's poster in 1933.
			Serial year of postcard prints	2 series in 1910

Table sources

- La vie du collectionneur, n° 170
- Cartes postales and collection, n° 116
- imuseejob.free.fr website and La vie du collectionneur, n° 390

=== Postcards ===
Calendars and posters were also widely used as postcards. Not all postcards have been inventoried, as they have never been found. In 1980, author and publisher Gérard Neudin estimated the number of postcards at "at least 84 from 31 drawings". The 32nd drawing corresponded to the 1916 calendar by painter Eugène Loup, listed by Italian author Carmello Calò Carducci in 1987. Finally, in 2001, the number of postcards was revised upwards, to around 126 for the major series (according to the table below), but this inventory remains theoretical, due to variations in certain editions. It has been established that 32 calendars and posters were the subject of postcards; cartophiles differentiate them into series. There are 5 main series up to 1914, and a rare "1916" series. The series are supposed to indicate the year in which the cards were printed, but to complicate matters, there may have been several editions of the same series, with some variations. Thus, while the 1903 and 1914 series are easily recognizable, the 1910 and especially the 1916 series are questionable.

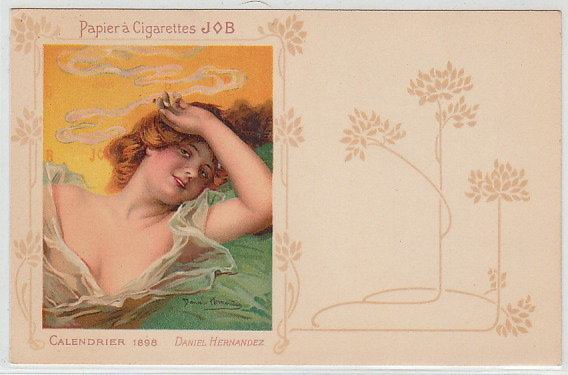
1903 series, D. Hernández.

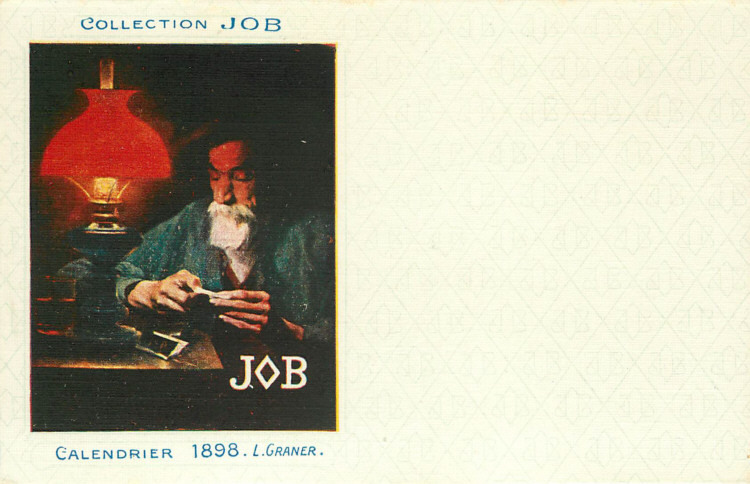
1910 series, L. Graner.

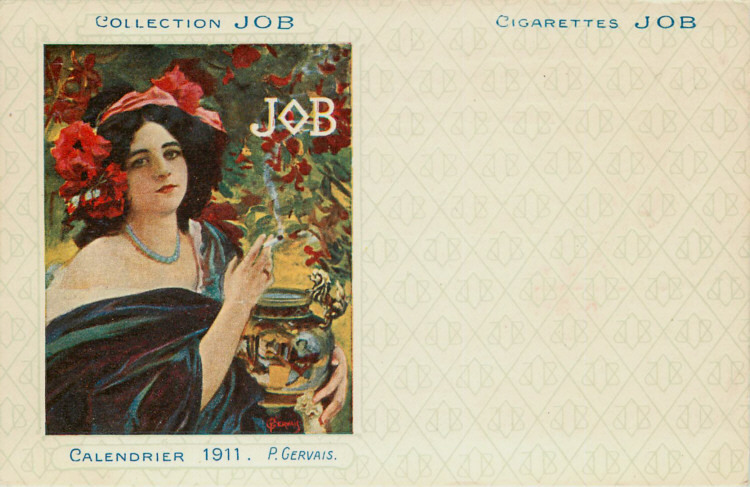
1911 series, P. Gervais.

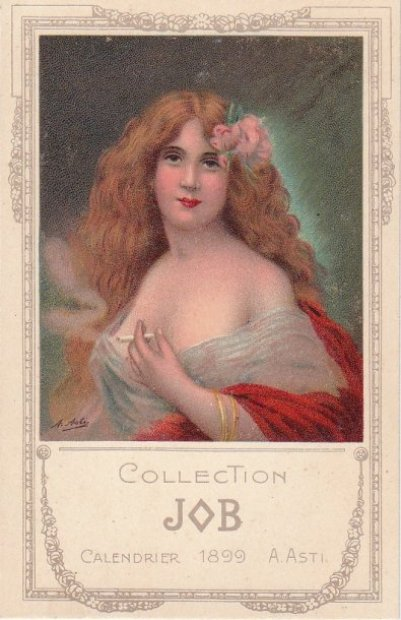
1914 series, A. Asti.

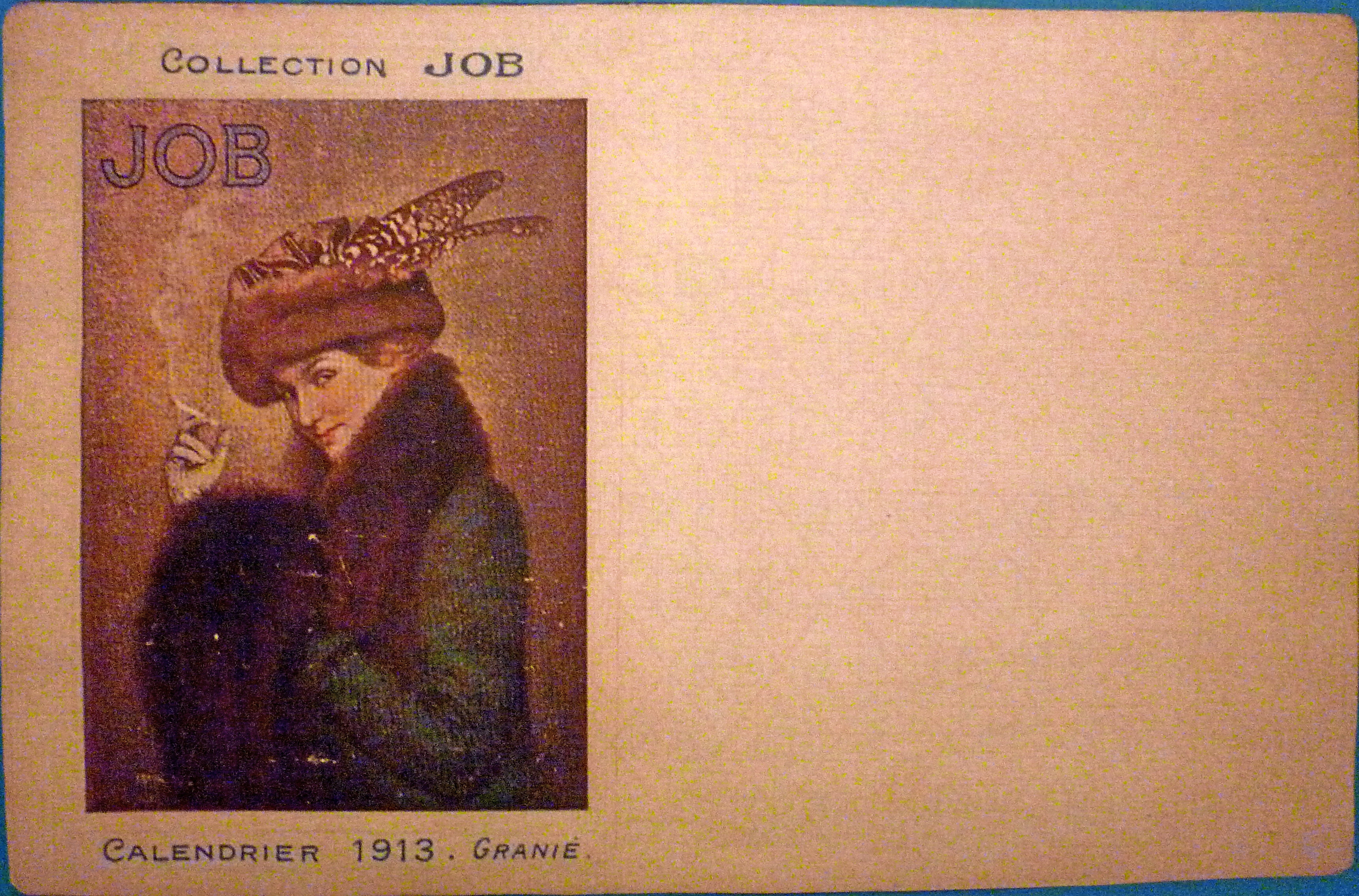
1916 series, J. Granié.

Series	Year	N° of postcards	Postcard orientation	Text	Ornament/Printer
1st	1903	12	Horizontal	Papier à Cigarettes JOB (JOB rolling paper)	Art Nouveau flowers
2nd	1910	20	Horizontal	collection JOB (JOB collection)	Squares, rhombuses
3rd	1910	8	Horizontal	collection JOB (JOB collection)	Squares, rhombuses + Lyon printer's mark
4th	1911	24	Horizontal	collection JOB Cigarettes JOB (JOB collection, JOB cigarettes)	Squares, rhombuses
5th known as "The Great Series".	1914	30	Vertical	collection JOB (JOB collection)	Frieze flower garland
"1916 series"	1916	32	Horizontal	collection JOB (JOB collection)	Squares, rhombuses

==== 1903 series ====
This series included 12 postcards, all of which have now been found except for Meunier and Chéret. The postcards are horizontal, illustrated on the left-hand side and edged with a salmon-pink "Art Nouveau" motif. The motif also occupies the bottom of the right-hand side. A variant of this series is also reported with beige floral motifs. The postcards were labelled " Papier à cigarettes JOB " (JOB rolling paper). They are of excellent printing quality and relatively rare.

==== 1910 series ====
The series is called "1910", but was issued at least twice, around 1907–1908. In all likelihood, these series included 20 cards in the "A" series and 8 cards in the "B" series (calendar reproductions). The 1910 (A) series was printed horizontally, with the words "Collection JOB" (JOB collection), but no printer's mark or "cigarettes JOB" (JOB cigarettes) label. The background is squared. This series is available in two paper qualities: linen and smooth satin. Print quality is good on the rough paper, fair for those on the smooth satin paper. The 1910 (B) series is horizontal, and differs from the 1910 (A) series in that "lyon" is the name of the printer's town where the cards were produced by "Art couleurs".

==== 1911 series ====
This series most certainly included 24 postcards, i.e. all production up to 1911 except for Rassenfosse. The series is horizontal, marked "Collection JOB, cigarettes JOB" (JOB collection, cigarettes JOB) and has a squared background. Print quality is fair on rough backgrounds and good on cards with smooth backgrounds.

==== 1914 series ====
The 1914 series included all production up to 1914, i.e. 30 cards. The design is vertical here, and this is the only series where it occupies the entire surface of the card and not just one half. The lower third of the surface is marked "Collection JOB" (JOB collection). The divided reverse side is marked "postcard". The printing quality is very good.

==== 1916 series ====
This set included the entire series, i.e. 32 illustrations. This series is the rarest of all, and the print run must have been small. Logically, it is the only one to include the Hervé and Loup calendars, issued in 1915 and 1916 respectively. Little known and poorly referenced, this so-called "1916" series may in fact have been marketed only after the war. What's more, a few details in the descriptions differ and could point to the existence of 2 distinct print runs. Indeed, the cards are always horizontal, the left half is the same as the 1910 series, but the right side is described, depending on the source, as either "decorated with a single diamond, containing the word Job very stylized" or as being identical to the 1910 series. The paper is rough and the printing quality, acceptable. This series is said to be subject to certain peculiarities: the 1910 Gervais calendar was mistakenly dated 1911, and the text on the Ng Duc Thuc card was adapted.

==== Single postcards ====
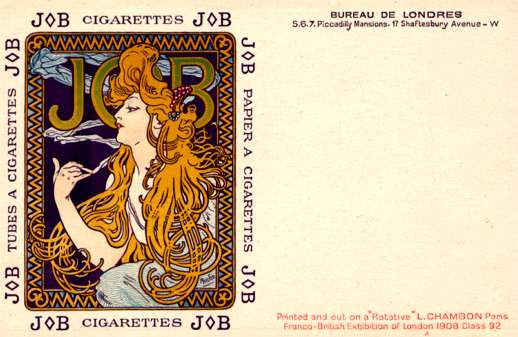
Postcard by Alphonse Mucha, London office edition, 1908

- Mucha's London office

This is the rare 1908 postcard published for the Franco-British Exhibition in London by JOB's London office. It's a reproduction of Mucha's calendar (Femme blonde).

- Cappiello, Le pacha

There is a large-format vertical postcard from Cappiello, "JOB cigarette paper and cigarettes". The printing date of this card is not known with certainty (1914?). Some of Cappiello's postcards differ from the 1914 series in minor ways: no outline on the front, or no inscription on the reverse. This is linked to the period reprints of this "successful" card.

- Other cards

Just as there is a large-format, vertical Gervais 1905 calendar postcard dating from around 1914, it's difficult to be exhaustive, as postcard issues were undoubtedly made elsewhere, but very sporadically.

=== Brief description of series works ===
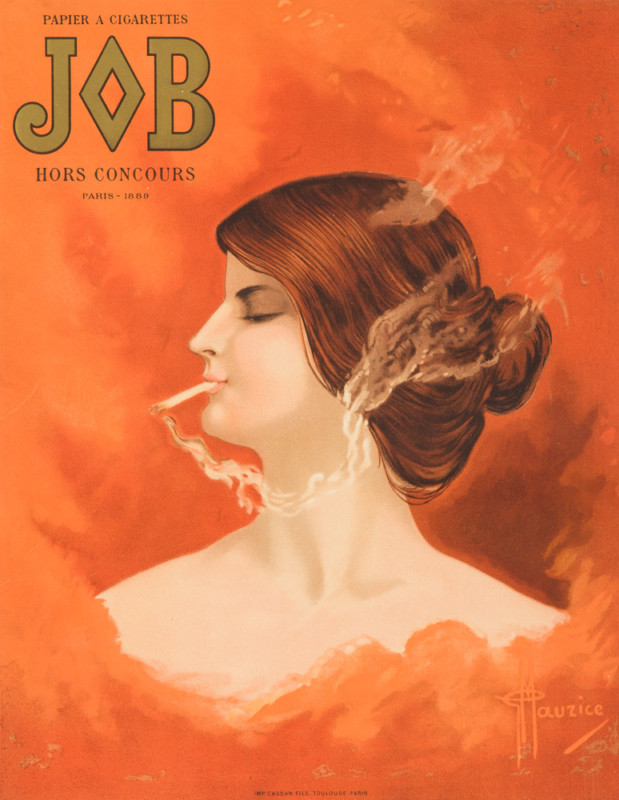
1897 G. Maurice calendar

Each creation in the series was initially published as a calendar, and sometimes as a poster. The calendar was generally printed on cardboard, or at least on reinforced paper, with an ephemeris of the year notched into the cardboard, which has often been leafed through and disappeared. Posters were printed on paper, sometimes in deluxe editions.

The poster or calendar, at least the first print run, often included the advertising slogan "Smoke with JOB or don't smoke" in the language of the poster's destination, the "JOB" trademark, sometimes a reference to "out of competition, Paris 1889" (or 1900), and was often decorated with a harmonious border. The reference to the Paris Universal Exhibition of 1889 or 1900 indicated that the JOB brand was "out of competition", meaning it won a medal. This clarification is important, as biographers have sometimes believed that the date corresponded to a medal received by the artist himself.

Other prints followed without any mention, with only the decorative image; this was also the case for the proofs before the letter, often found in the collections of old printing works. The printer's mark was often present, especially for quality prints, often the former Cassan or Sirven artistic printers, both of which had branches in Toulouse and Paris. It's important to distinguish these vintage lithographic prints from the more recent offset reproductions that have been in vogue for the last ten years or so, and to bear in mind that these posters, which were intended for advertising purposes and are by no means cabinet prints, were often printed in different sizes and qualities in their day.

Here is a brief description of the works.

- 1895 Bouisset poster. Firmin Bouisset, the specialist in children's advertising (he was the father of the famous Menier chocolate poster), began the JOB series with a little chimney sweep, black with smoke, whose connection with the brand was hard to see. It was used on posters, now rare, but not in calendars.
- 1895 Meunier Calendar. This was the first female JOB in the series. According to the inscription on the postcards, this was originally a calendar, but it has to be said that almost all of them have now disappeared. The corresponding period poster, large in size (approx. 240 × 87 cm), was printed by Chaix; it was intended more for lining city walls than for interior decoration. Other posters have more modest formats, but are nevertheless larger than later creations by other illustrators; given the various formats encountered, we can deduce that this successful design was the subject of numerous print runs.
- 1896 Chéret calendar. Proudly displaying a cigarette, this moving woman, whose back can be seen, was typical of Chéret's elegant and cheerful creations, and was thus "La Chérette" from the JOB collection. On the small-format calendar, the design was highlighted by a decorative border: the zigzag motif used on the brand's cigarette-paper notebooks, a motif that was to be used again and again by poster artists. The design, without the frieze, was used again for an imposing 1.20-meter-high poster by Imprimerie Chaix.
- 1897 Maurice calendar. The first in a long series of smaller posters (51 × 38 cm). This work by Maurice, an unidentified artist, depicted a woman in profile, stylized in orange tones. The printer was Cassan Fils Toulouse-Paris.
- 1897 Mucha calendar and 1898 Mucha poster. Mucha's famous Femme Blonde JOB is world-famous. A splendid, dreamy creature with long, curving hair mingling with wisps of smoke, this "Mucha-style" woman is not to be trifled with by her admirers, whose detractors refer to her as "Mucha macaroni". An icon of the "advertising woman", a pin-up before her time, all the elements were in place to make this calendar the emblematic centerpiece of the JOB collection. After seducing Art Nouveau enthusiasts at the beginning of the 20th century, it was rediscovered in the 1960s by Psychedelic enthusiasts, and is still used and adapted today in countless works and derivative products. This calendar was the subject of numerous poster prints in slightly different shades. For his second creation, La femme brune, Mucha was inspired by a fresco by Michelangelo in the Sistine Chapel. The exuberant hair, typical of Mucha, remained, as did numerous allusions to the JOB brand, from the brooch to the cigarette-paper case and even the background as wallpaper. A third poster by Mucha remained in the draft stage. The plates were printed in Paris by F. Champenois.
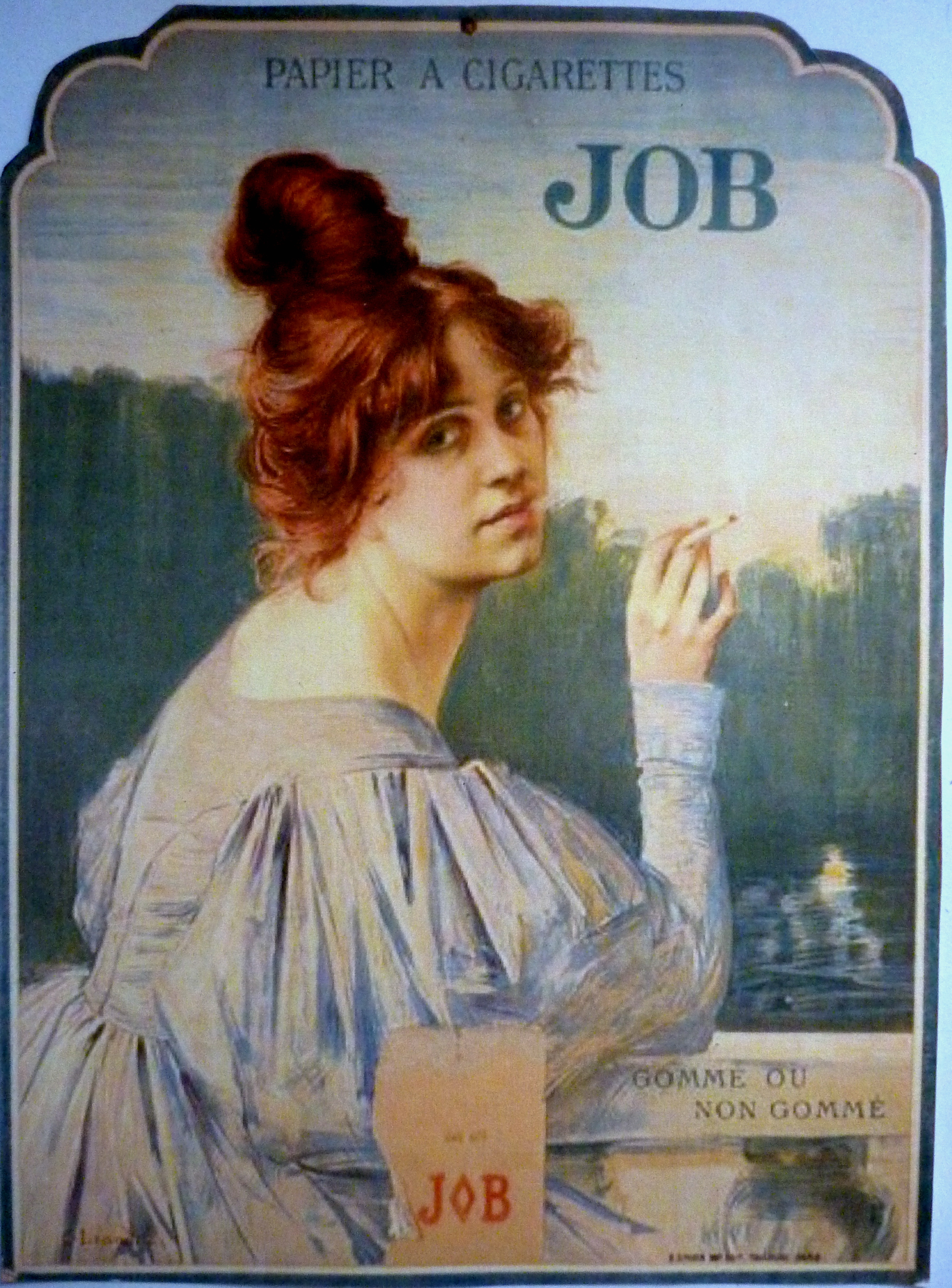
  1900 Charles Léandre calendar
- 1897 Atché poster. The young Jane Atché – she was only 24 when she imagined this subject – was the only woman to contribute to the collection. Produced in 1896 for a print run the following year, the stylized representation of a woman smoking and the contrasting colors make this poster a remarkable work. Its refined graphics evoke Toulouse-Lautrec or Japanese prints. The woman imagined by Jane Atché smoked with natural simplicity and elegance, in her large black cape, her hair wisely up. The draft poster presented a young woman in a straw-yellow dress and large black cape, but was modified by the JOB company: the dress became a soft green to match the background, the circle of smoke revolved around the JOB trademark and, as on most pre-1900 productions, the initials "Out of contest, Paris 1889" were added. The poster broke with the depiction of women smoking as "women of ill repute" or "of dubious morality", at a time when smoking was reserved for men. Printed in Toulouse by Cassan Fils, it was not published as a calendar.
- 1898 Graner calendar. This calendar is atypical of the collection. There's no JOB woman here, but an elderly man, poorly lit by a kerosene lamp, dutifully preparing himself a JOB cigarette.
- 1898 Hernández calendar. This was the painter's only contribution as a JOB woman. Hernández often painted portraits of young women, such as this one, pensive or dreamy and very much in tune with the times.
- 1899 Asti calendar. This calendar featured a woman with long hair and a flower, in the style and with this attribute of the Art Nouveau woman. Printed by Cassan Fils Toulouse-Paris, it measured 43 × 32 cm and bore the words "Hors concours Paris 1889" ("Out of competition Paris 1889").
- 1900 Léandre calendar. Léandre, the humorist from Montmartre, made a single contribution to the JOB collection. For the calendar, printed by Sirven in Toulouse, Léandre's young redheaded JOB woman, with her slightly enticing gaze, reflected the painter's boulevardier character.
- 1901, 1903 and 1905 Maxence calendars. The original 1901 calendar, an oil on canvas, is now in the Musée d'Orsay. This astonishing Symbolist painting depicts a redheaded woman holding a smoking cigarette in her hand in a spidery plant setting: this is Jeanne Bardou-Job, daughter of the industrialist and patron of the arts, owner of JOB rolling papers. The calendar print, with its high-quality colors and gilding, was produced by the Sirven artistic printing house in Toulouse. Given its success, it was systematically reproduced on postcards and posters. After the Femme rousse à l'orchidée, Maxence did it again in 1903, depicting a woman with a cigarette in a boat against a watery backdrop of water lilies. Finally, for his third calendar, Maxence, as usual, depicted a woman in a plant world.
- 1902, 1904, 1905, 1909, 1910, 1911 and 1912 Gervais calendars. Gervais was the most prolific of the painters in the JOB collection, his creations spanning some ten years. The artist liked to depict pretty women with flowers blooming in their hair: everything was a pretext for using a colorful palette, and Woman with a Garland of Flowers 1902 was his first contribution. Relatively rare: she wasn't smoking, so the advertisement could be used for products other than cigarette paper. Two years later, the painter from Toulouse drew his second JOB woman. This woman in a hat, holding a carnival mask near a light, was the medium for a pleasant calendar. For his third contribution, Gervais remained in the register of the flower woman, which he had already interpreted for the 1902 calendar. In 1909, he again depicted a woman with flowers in her hair, in keeping with the traditional representation of the 1900 woman. In 1910, it was the turn of a woman wearing a mantilla, in 1911 a pretty calendar of a woman carrying a vase, and in 1912 a woman smoking, again in a setting of flowers on an aquatic background, one of his most successful works.
- 1906 Duvocelle calendar. Portrait painter Duvocelle depicted a woman in profile for his only contribution to the collection. Only the woman's face, hands and especially the cigarette were pale, while the clothes and background were very dark. The complete calendar was distributed with the 1906 ephemeris, the drawing was dated 1905 and there were generally no printer's marks; the calendar also featured a wide imitation wood border, which was not repeated on the postcards.
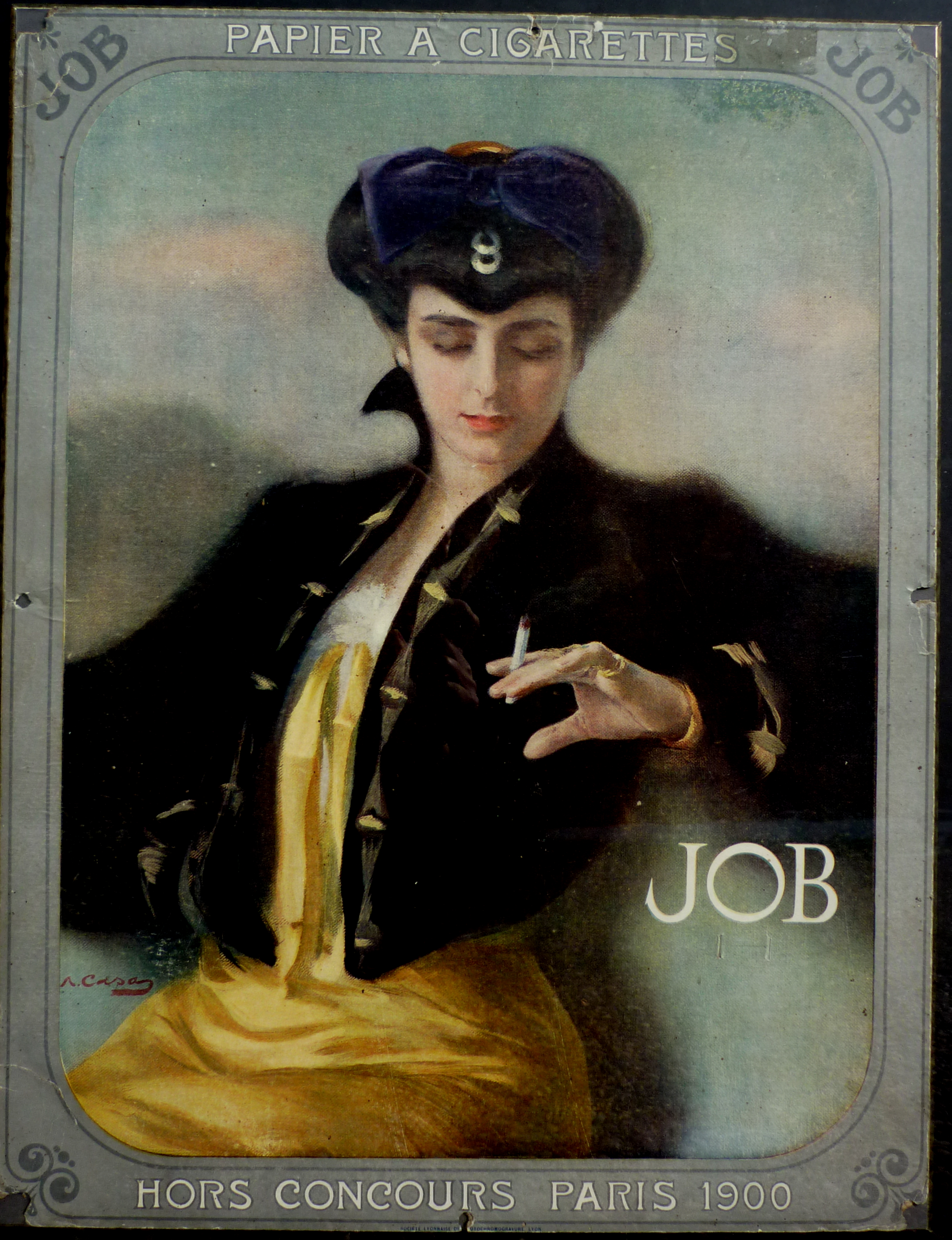
  1906 Ramon Casas calendar
- 1906 Casas calendar. The calendar portrayed a woman in a Spanish costume, with a black jacket and yellow dress. The background appeared flat, as was frequently done by this master of the Catalan modernist school. The finesse of the drawing, the color contrasts and the mastery and originality of the line made of this a pleasant, high-quality work. The drawing was surrounded by a gray border, which was absent from posters and postcards. This calendar was marked "hors-concours Paris 1900", but there is no printer's mark.
- 1907 Villa calendar. It featured a smiling woman enjoying a cigarette, the smoke from which formed the three letters JOB. The work was not decorated with a frieze or frame, as was often the case with borders.
- 1908 and 1914 Rochegrosse calendars. These two orientalist works were painted in the orange hues so beloved of this artist. The JOB 1908 woman is wearing a shoulder-length tunic in a slightly seductive pose. The printer's mark indicated Lyon, and the calendar was bordered by a frame in orange tones. The second woman, illustrating the 1914 calendar, is a beautiful oriental woman wearing a tiara.
- 1913 Granié calendar. This rare calendar from the Champenois printing house in Paris featured a woman wearing a feathered hat. Today, the work is best known for the postcard corresponding to this calendar, published during the "Great War".
- 1910 Rassenfosse poster. The poster depicts a gypsy woman smoking. It's a large poster, 129 × 94 cm, printed in Liège.
- 1914 Cappiello poster. Along with Cassandre, Cappiello is the precursor of the modern poster. His creation for JOB represented a resolute break with his predecessors and Art Nouveau, which was in its twilight years, for a new style of poster that played on pure color contrasts, stylized lines and artistic research. He also left the over-exploited female repertoire to create Le pacha, one of the few JOB works to feature men. Cappiello's Le pacha was a great success and was republished. It is these reprints that are the most frequent, or least rare, today. The printer was either Vercasson or Devambez. The 1933 poster from Vercasson, Paris, bore the words 13th edition, June 1933, demonstrating the poster's success with the public. As for Devambez, its competitor, its aggressive sales practices also favored the large print runs of Cappiello, its protégé. The fact remains that, despite these relatively large print runs, the poster remains highly collectible among lovers of fine images, and its value is reflected in its price.
- 1914 Duc Thuc poster. This original and very rare poster by Nguyen Duc Thuc is atypical in the collection. Depicting a Chinese scene, it bore, on a wide upper band, the drawing of an unrolled parchment bearing the words "la grande marque française JOB" (the great French brand JOB), demonstrating the company's growing importance in the export market.
- 1915 Hervé calendar. This wartime calendar featured a woman in a red suit imitating a uniform jacket. The calendar is quite rare, and the postcard, from the latest 1916 series, is almost impossible to find.
- 1916 Loup calendar. Eugène Loup's JOB woman was finely processed in brown cameo tones. This was a very rare presentation in which the pensive JOB woman (this was wartime) was not smoking. The calendar, whose print run was small, generally lacked a printer's mark. The postcard, which obviously only existed in the last series (1916), is very rare.

=== Other creations ===
Other posters, which are rarely referenced and quoted, are listed here. As they were not printed on postcards, they do not benefit from the remarkable memory offered by this widely distributed medium, that of a widely collected image with the advantage of small format. A development on the comparison between postcard and poster collecting around 1900, specialized directories and postcard series devoted to posters (Cinos, Gérin, Job, Chemins de Fer posters). They are no less interesting, especially as they are sometimes the work of important illustrators.

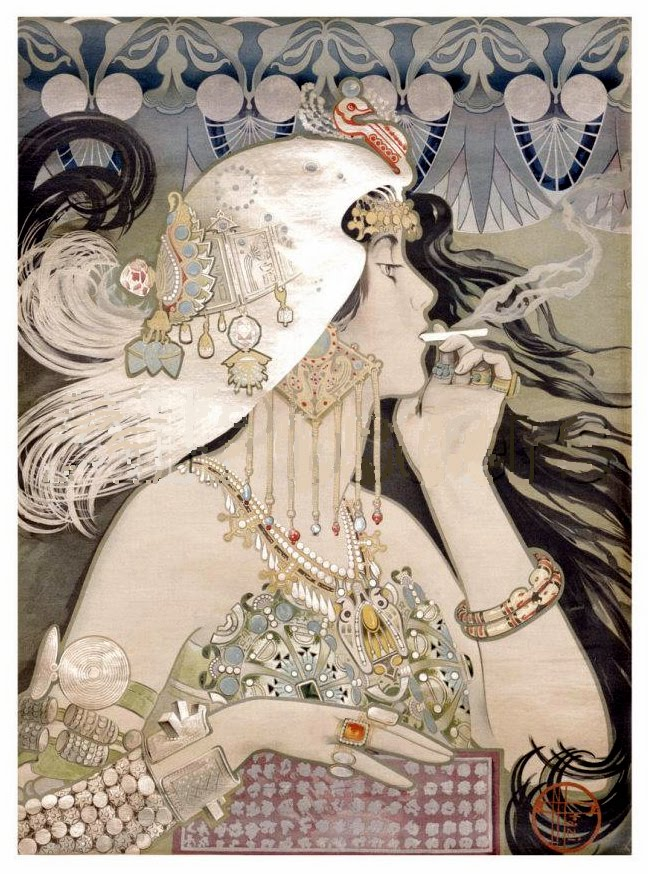
1902 Manuel Orazi poster

Year	Illustrator	Theme	Description
1895	Jean de Paleologue (Pal)	Art nouveau: sensual woman	Poster bearing the text "out of competition Paris 1889", depicting a sensual woman or cocotte, boldly dressed in a green dress near a bedside table.
circa 1900	Louis Vallet	Humor: the firefighter	rare JOB poster of a firefighter sacrificing fire extinguishing to the pleasure of a cigarette
1898	Félix Thuillière	Militaria: The spahi	Poster entitled Spahi, size 55 x 36 cm, published by the printing house Cassan fils, Toulouse Paris and dated 1898.
circa 1900–1910	Félix Thuillière	Militaria: Guard Cossacks	Poster entitled Cosaque de la garde, size 55 × 36 cm, published by the printing house Cassan fils, Toulouse.
1902	Manuel Orazi	Art nouveau: Female profile	Poster or print, woman in profile, not JOB branded but often cited as such
circa 1914		Militaria: Soldiers on the front line	Soldiers at the front during the "Great War". Patriotic series of posters on the various European army corps. The posters usually featured soldiers rolling or smoking cigarettes. Slogan, in French only, "fumez le JOB ou ne fumez pas" ("smoke with JOB or don't smoke"), various medium-sized (approx. 50 cm) unsigned signs, example of illustration: gunner, French infantry soldier.
1915	Gaspar Camps	Spain: cigarette-smoking woman	Spanish woman, elegantly dressed woman smoking a cigarette on red background, Dimensions 50 × 40 cm or 43 × 30.5 cm
circa 1920	Gaspar Camps	Spain: Spanish girl with pearl necklace	Poster on green background of a "femme fatale", Printing company Sirven, Toulouse, 26 × 35.2 cm, in addition to JOB, the poster was also used by other brands, such as Anis Antich
circa 1920	André Joyeux	Colonies: Asian smoking couple	Poster with a pair of Asian smokers facing each other in profile, size 160 × 120 cm, printed by Sirven, Toulouse Paris.
circa 1920	André Joyeux	Colonies : Buddha	Poster depicting a meditating Buddha, size 52 × 38 cm, one of the JOB posters signed by A. Joyeux is conserved at the Bibliothèque de Genève and dated Circa 1910.
1923	André Joyeux	Colonies: old Chinese man	Poster showing an old Chinese man on a red background, size 52 × 36 cm, printed by Sirven, Toulouse. Poster dated 1923 by the Musée du Papier, Angoulême
1924	Cyprien Boulez	Woman with a fan	Poster showing a woman in a summer dress carrying a fan

== In 20th-century art ==
Until 1914, calendar, poster and postcard editions were commonplace. They became rarer during the war, but continued nonetheless. In the inter-war period, posters were mainly used to promote products for exportation to the colonies.

By the 1930s, there was little to report, and collaboration with artists became the exception. Of note, however, is a typically Art Deco creation, "Cigarettes Job blanches" (White Job cigarettes), by Swiss engraver Noël Fontanet (1898–1982), and the 1933 reprint of Cappiello's Le pacha poster. The few rigorously geometric posters of the brand from the 1940s, though worthy of note, do not stand out from the mass of advertising of the period; they were often anonymous. In 1961, graphic designer and illustrator Donald Brun produced an advertising poster for the brand entitled Algérienne Job (Algerian Job).

JOB inspired artists such as Maurits Cornelis Escher with his 1943 reptile lithograph. After decades of disgrace, Art Nouveau returned to the forefront in the 1960s. In 1966, Alphonse Mucha's 1897 JOB poster was reinterpreted by Stanley Mouse and Alton Kelley with a psychedelic effect. Printed in San Francisco, to advertise a rock concert. But in both cases, it was no longer an order from the JOB brand.

As elsewhere in the world, in the last quarter of the 20th century, the fight against smoking became a public health priority in France. The Veil law of 1976 and the Évin law of 1991 prohibited all direct or indirect advertising for tobacco and tobacco products. These measures could have put a stop to tobacco advertising, but the brand's artistic creations had already fallen into disuse at a time of serious financial difficulties.

Nevertheless, in 2008, JOB asked British punk musician, painter and stuckist Paul Harvey, an artist inspired by Art Nouveau, to update the brand's advertising posters. The result was a series of Famous Doubles posters, a commercial reference to the JOB factory's double packs. Gilbert and George supported this graphic creation, unlike other artist duos, The Mighty Boosh or The White Stripes, who appeared on the poster projects without their agreement. Famous Doubles were exhibited at Wanted Gallery, a contemporary art gallery in Notting Hill, London, in 2009. The posters featured both real and imaginary characters, with no direct allusion to the brand except through collective memory. Thus, in a very Art Nouveau setting featuring Edgar Maxence's 1903 calendar frieze, and in a symmetrical composition, Gilbert and George posed standing framing Le pacha, the emblematic character imagined by Leonetto Cappiello almost a century earlier, as if to "come full circle".

Today, the posters in the collection are widely recognized and reproduced. While art lovers and collectors prefer chromolithographic plates that are easy to recognize, the market is flooded with "decorative posters", reproductions of images at low prices. To adorn walls, these beautiful images of yesteryear still have their enthusiasts. The JOB collection will remain an outstanding, timeless example of advertising graphics.

== Image gallery ==
=== Selected calendars and posters ===
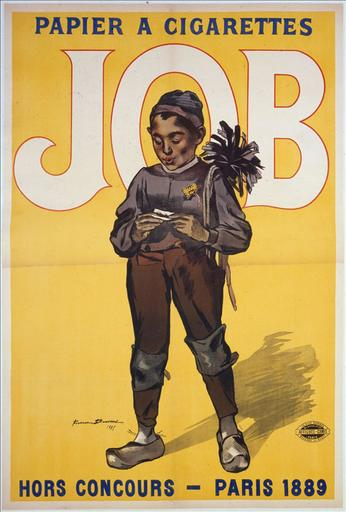
Firmin Bouisset, affiche 1895

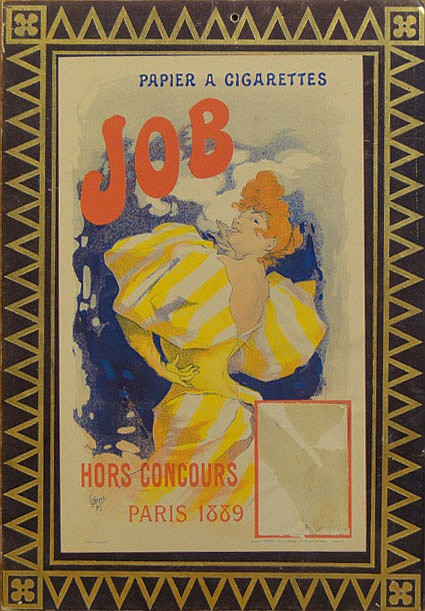
Jules Chéret, calendrier 1896 avec sa frise en zigzag

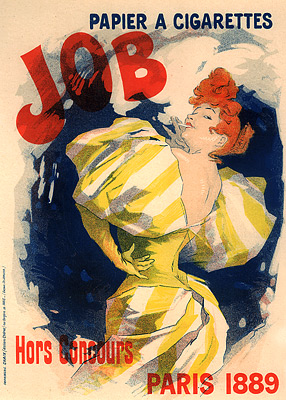
Jules Chéret, affiche 1896

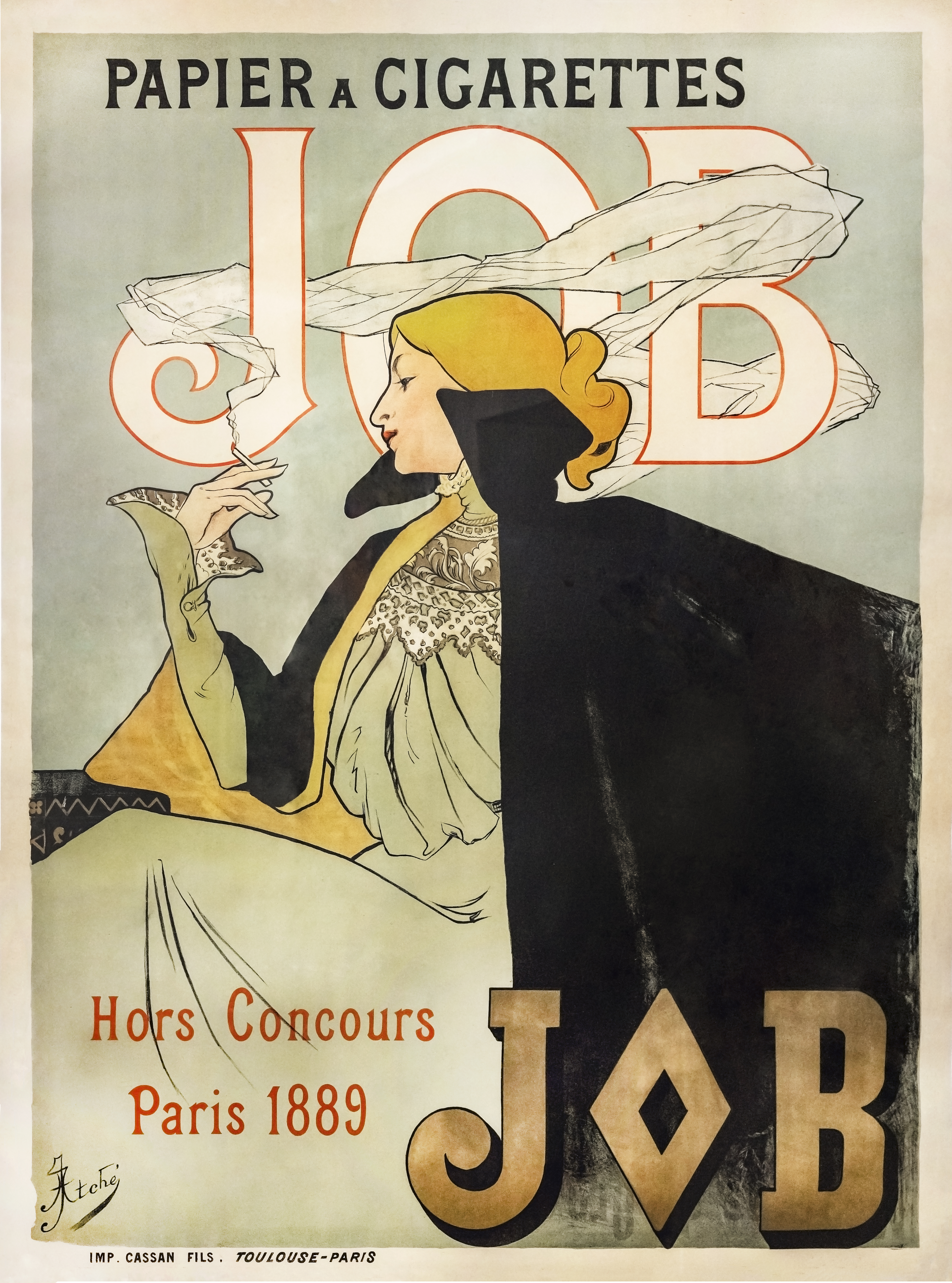
Jane Atché, affiche 1896

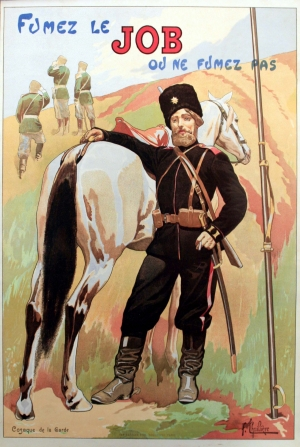
Félix Thuillière, affiche vers 1900

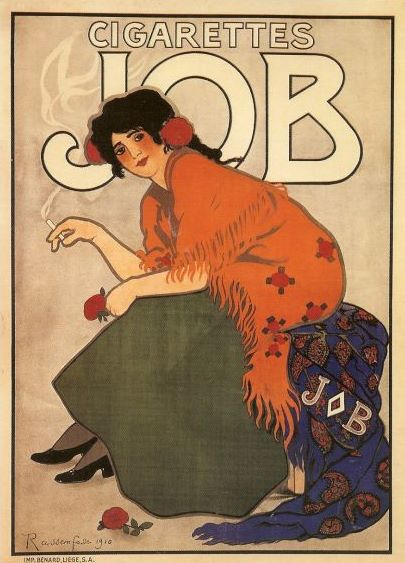
Armand Rassenfosse, affiche 1910

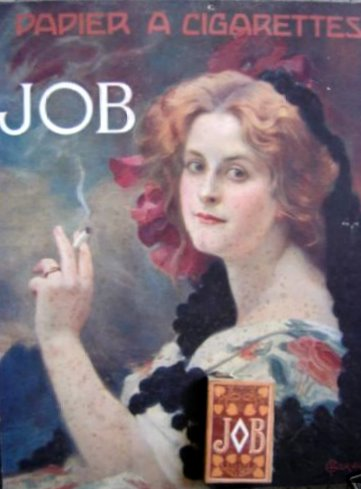
Paul Jean Gervais, calendrier 1910 avec son éphéméride

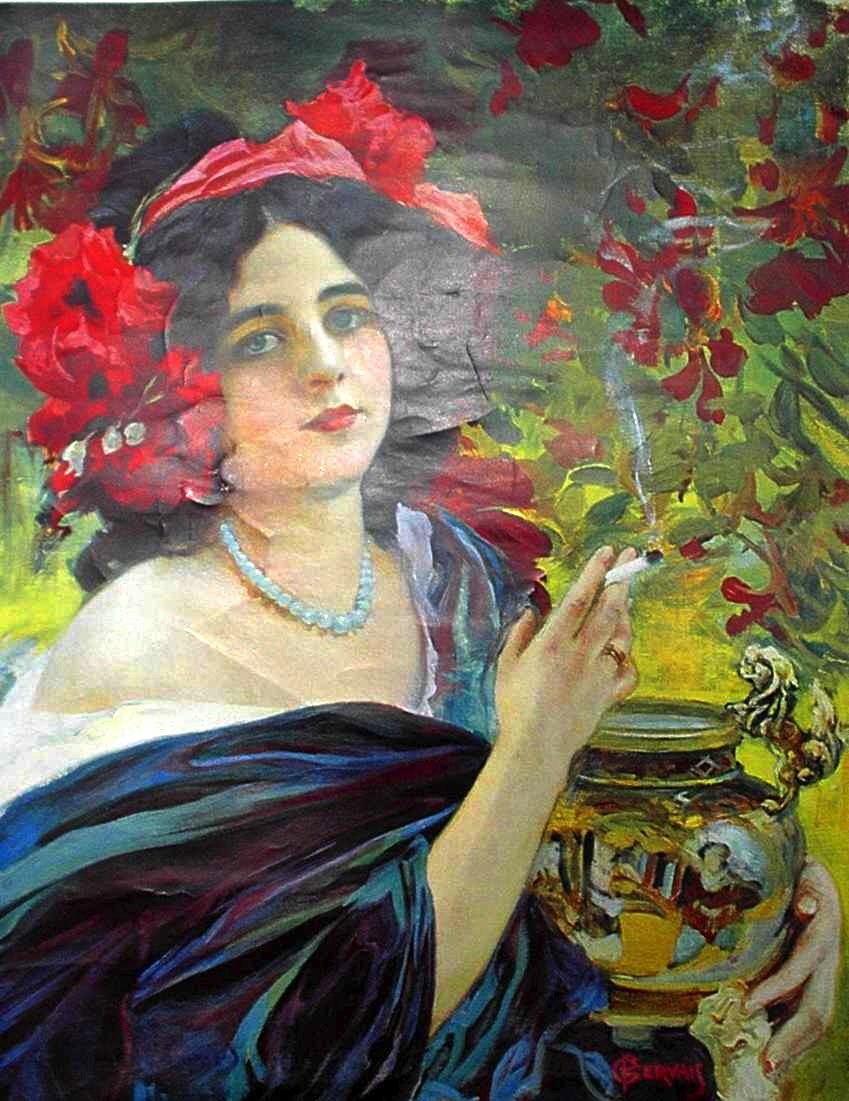
Paul Jean Gervais, affiche 1911

=== Selected postcards ===
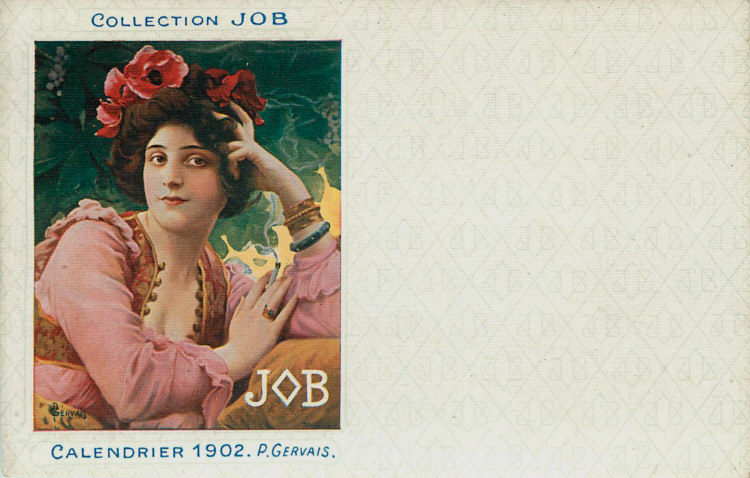
Paul Jean Gervais, 1902 postcard

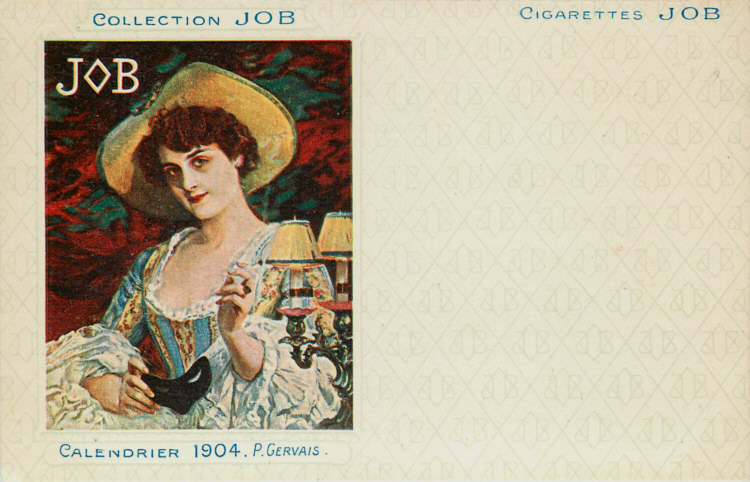
Paul Jean Gervais, 1904 postcard

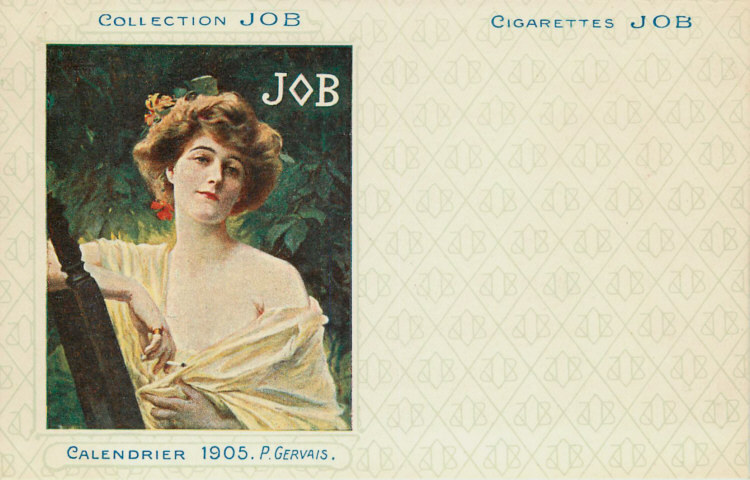
Paul Jean Gervais, 1905 postcard

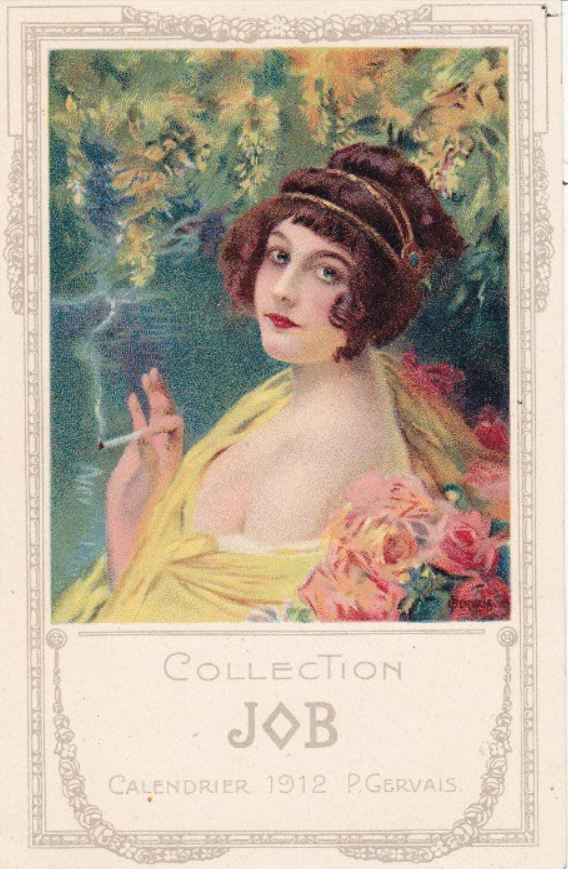
Paul Jean Gervais, 1912 postcard

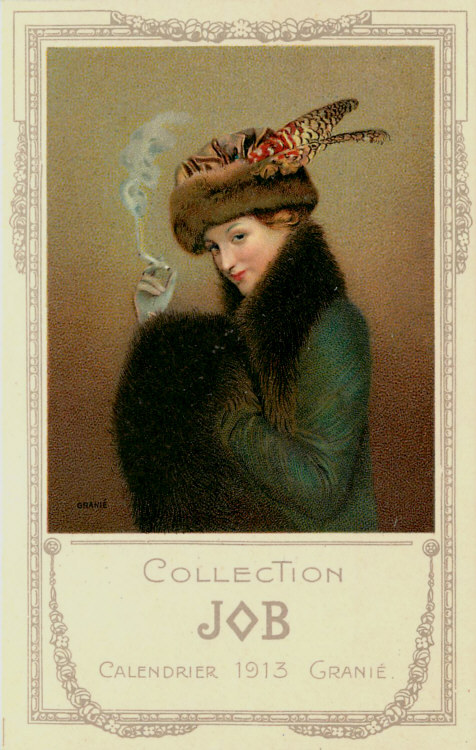
Joseph Granié, 1913 postcard

The year indicated corresponds to the calendar date.

== See also ==
- JOB (rolling papers)

== Bibliography ==
Documents used as a source for this article.

- Fanetti, Giovanni; Godoli, Ezio (1992). Art nouveau. La carte postale (in French). Celiv. ISBN 978-2-86535-158-9.
- Weill, Alain (1987). Affiches et art publicitaire (in French). Editions Mayer. ISBN 978-2-85299-003-6.
- Calò Carducci, Carmello (1987). "Une grande série La Collection JOB". Cartes Postales et Collection (in French) (116).
- "La "Collection Job"". La Vie du Collectionneur (in French) (170). March 21, 1997.
- "Le site des collectionneurs. La collection JOB". La Vie du Collectionneur (in French) (390). November 23, 2001.
