= Jules Flandrin =

French painter

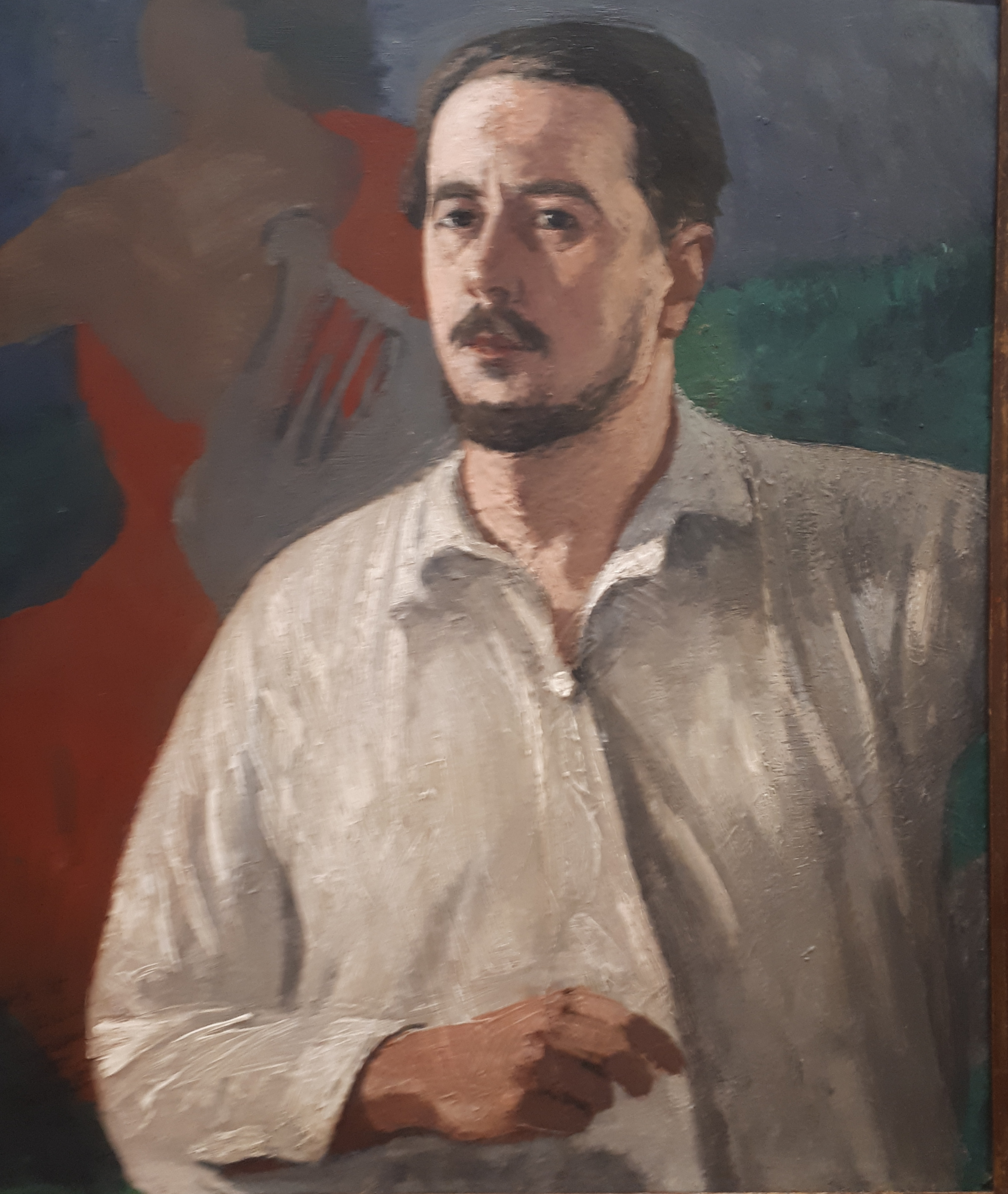
Self-portrait by Flandrin, c. 1924

Jules Flandrin (1871–1947) was a French painter, printer and draughtsman, born at Corenc, near Grenoble, on 9 July 1871. He was a pupil of Gustave Moreau. He was a contemporary of Henri Matisse, Georges Rouault, Albert Marquet, Henri Evenepoel and Léon Printemps. He became somewhat famous for being fairly conformist early in his career but later in life he made more emotional and less widely known art. His experiences during World War I shaped the rest of his life and artistic career. He was awarded the Légion d'honneur in 1912.

He died at Corenc, and was buried at the Saint Roch Cemetery in Grenoble.
