= Edgar Maxence =

French painter

Edgard Maxence
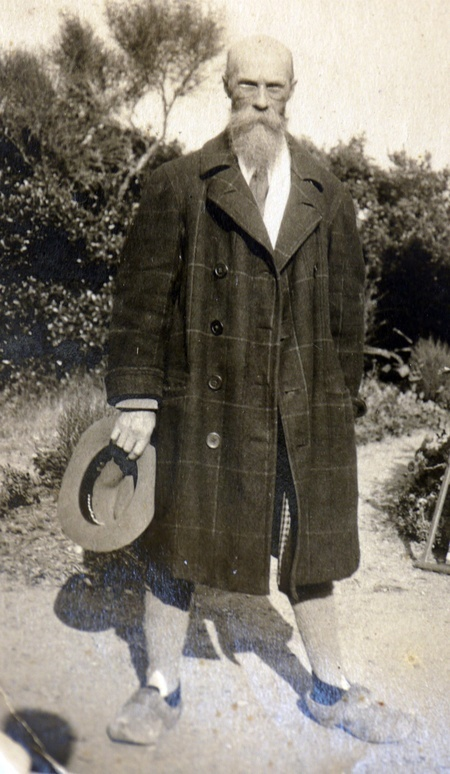
- Edgard Maxence
- Born: 17 September 1871; Nantes, France
- Died: 31 July 1954 (aged 82); La Bernerie-en-Retz, France
- Education: École des Beaux-Arts
- Known for: Painter
- Notable work: L'âme de la forêt
- Movement: Symbolism

Edgard Maxence (French: [maksɑ̃s]; 17 September 1871 – 31 July 1954) was a French Symbolist painter.

== Life ==
He was taught by Elie Delaunay and Gustave Moreau at the École des Beaux-Arts in Paris. He is a contemporary of Henri Evenepoel, Jules Flandrin, Albert Marquet, Henri Matisse, Léon Printemps, Georges Rouault and other notable alumni from this famous school. He exhibited in the Salon des Artistes Français from 1894 until 1939, and was active on the salon's committees and juries. Maxence combined a highly trained technique with a taste for medieval and mythical subjects and for hermetic imagery; he exhibited at the Salon de la Rose+Croix from 1895 to 1897.

In 1920 he painted the image of Our Lady on the vaulted ceiling of the choir in the Basilica of the Rosary in Lourdes. He also illustrated the book Sainte-Jeanne-d'Arc (1945) by Jean-Joseph-Léonce Villepelet (Bishop of Nantes 1936–1966).

== Gallery ==
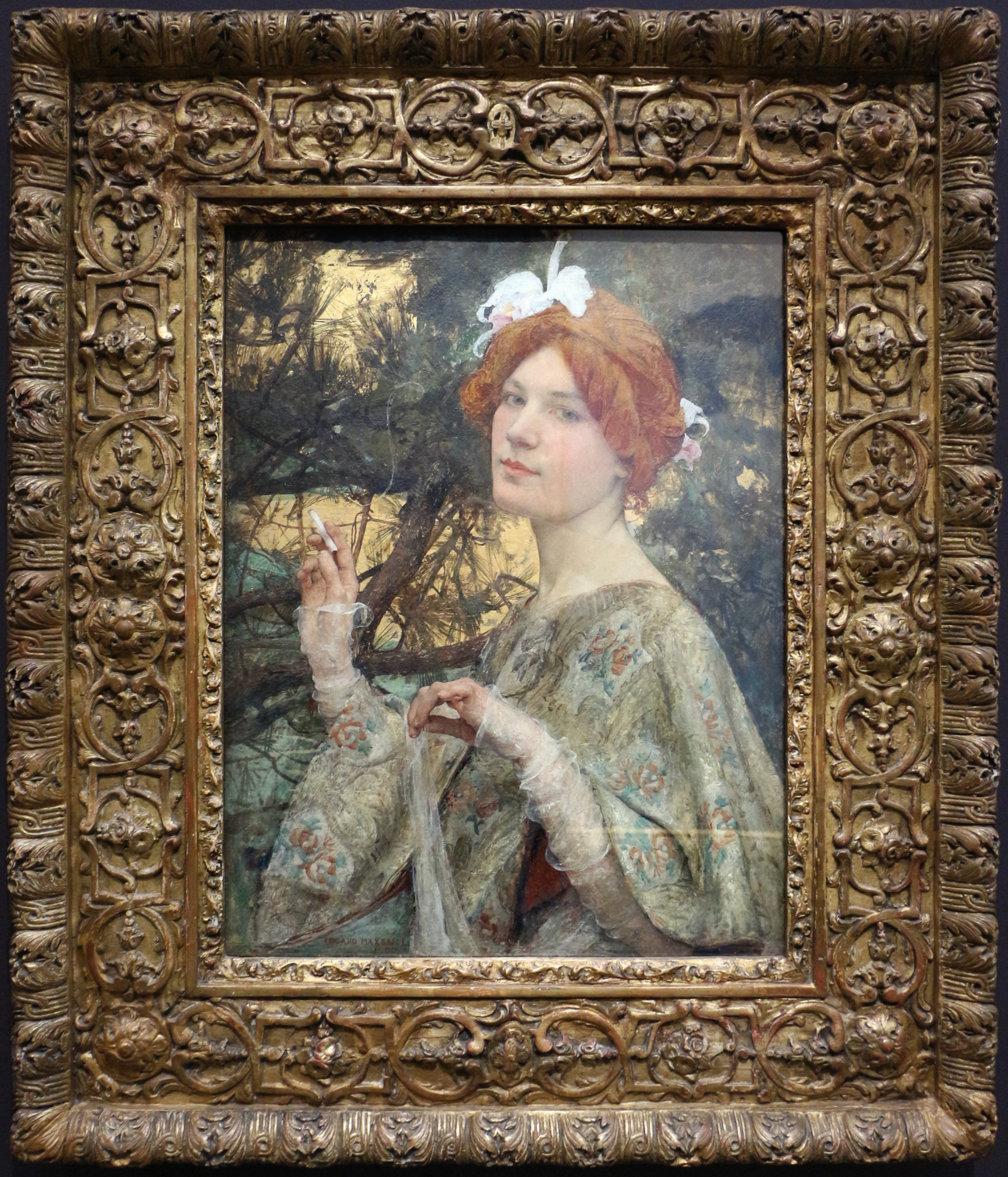
Donna con Orchidea, 1900

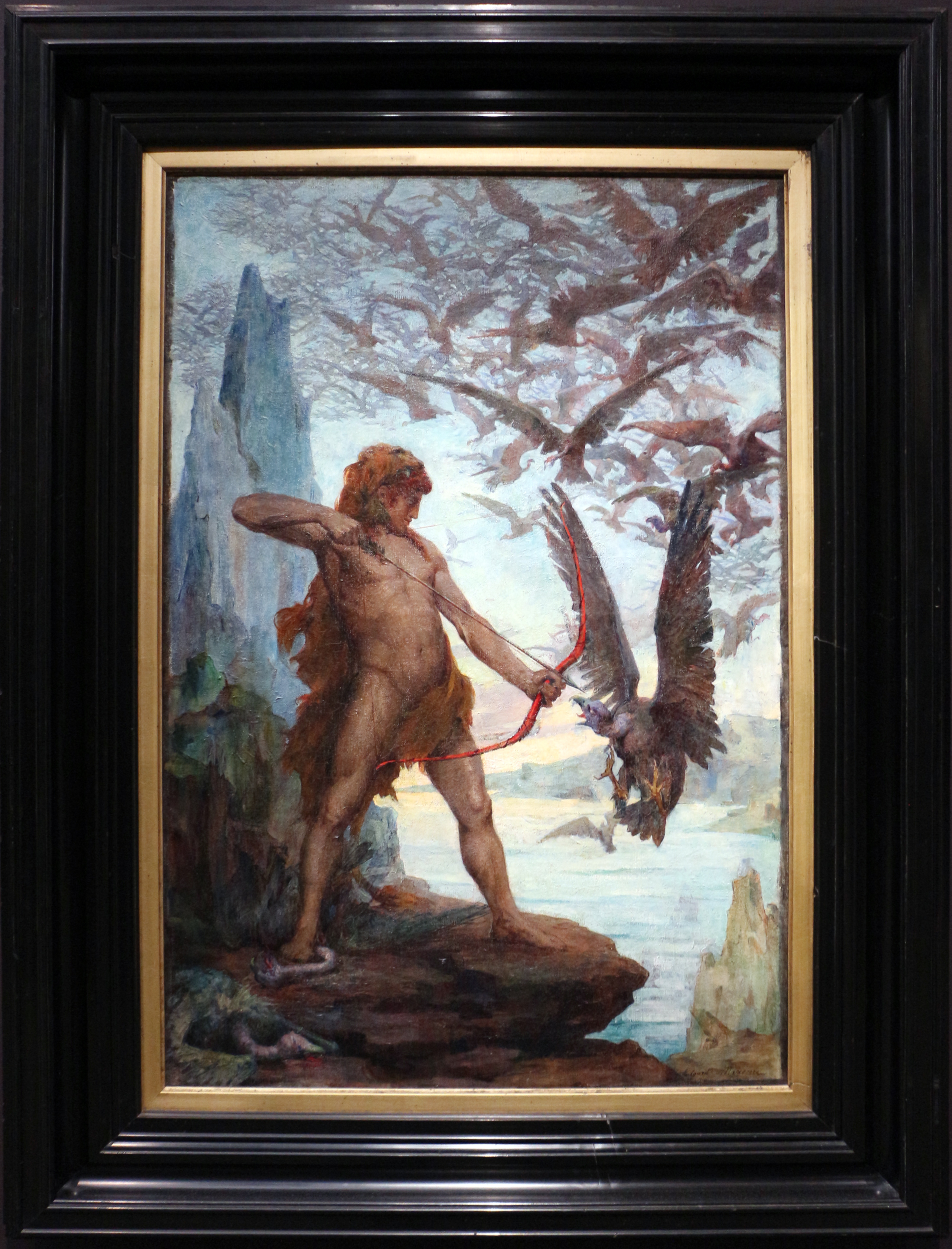
Ercole Uccide gli Uccelli di Stinfalo, 1893

== Works in museums or public galleries ==
- In the Musée d'Orsay, Paris

Femme à l'Orchidée, 1900
Sérénité, ca. 1912
Tête de jeune fille, 1932
Fleurs des champs, ca. 1950

- Portrait de jeune fille, ca. 1900, Musée des Beaux-Arts de Rennes
- "Le Livre de Paix", Musée des Beaux-Arts de Bordeaux
- L'âme de la forêt, 1898, Musée des Beaux-Arts de Nantes.
- Le Livre de Paix, 1913, Art Gallery of New South Wales
- "Annunciation, Purité", 1901, Wiesbaden Museum
