= Jane Atché =

French painter

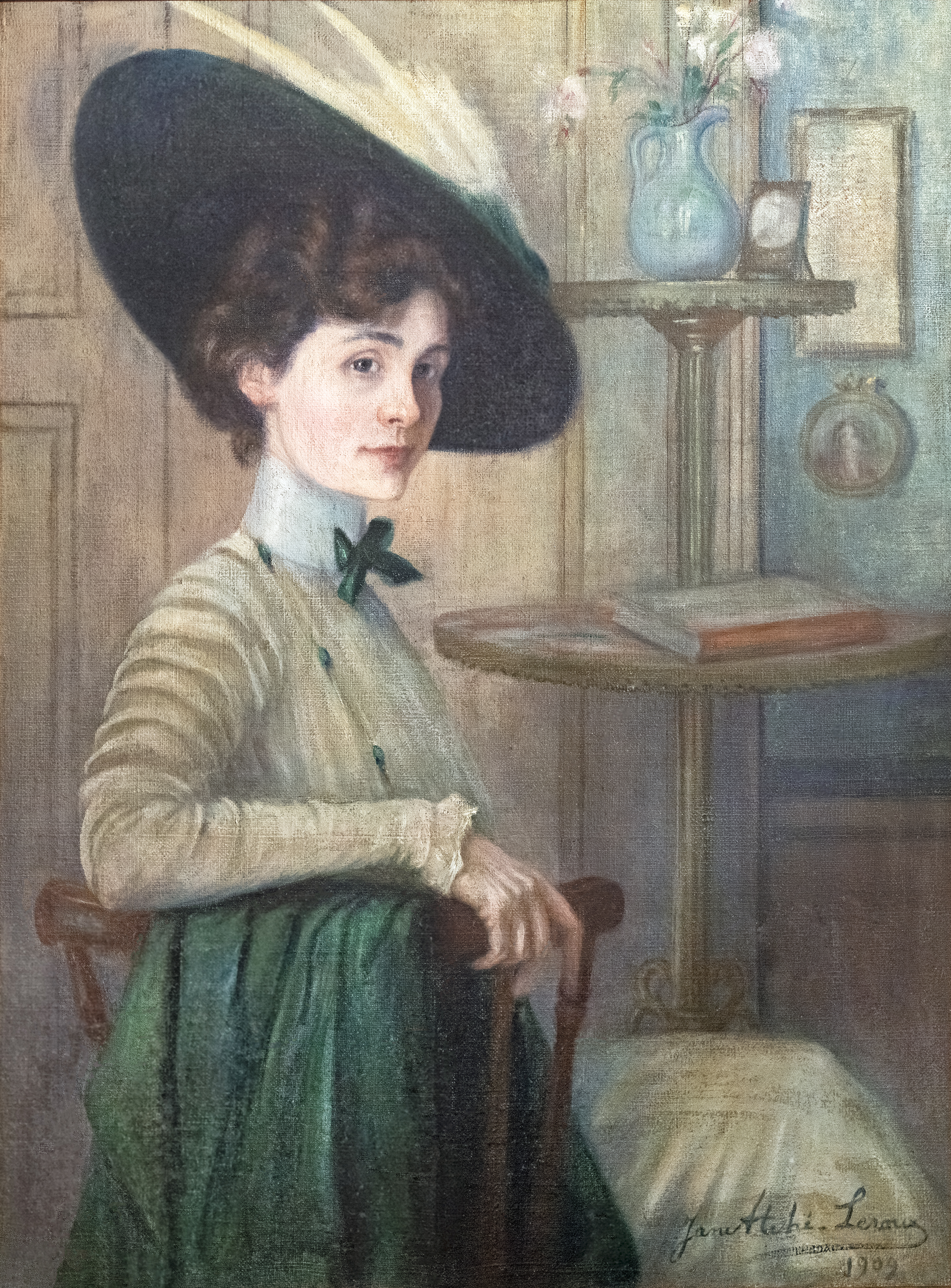
Self-portrait with green Hat (1909)

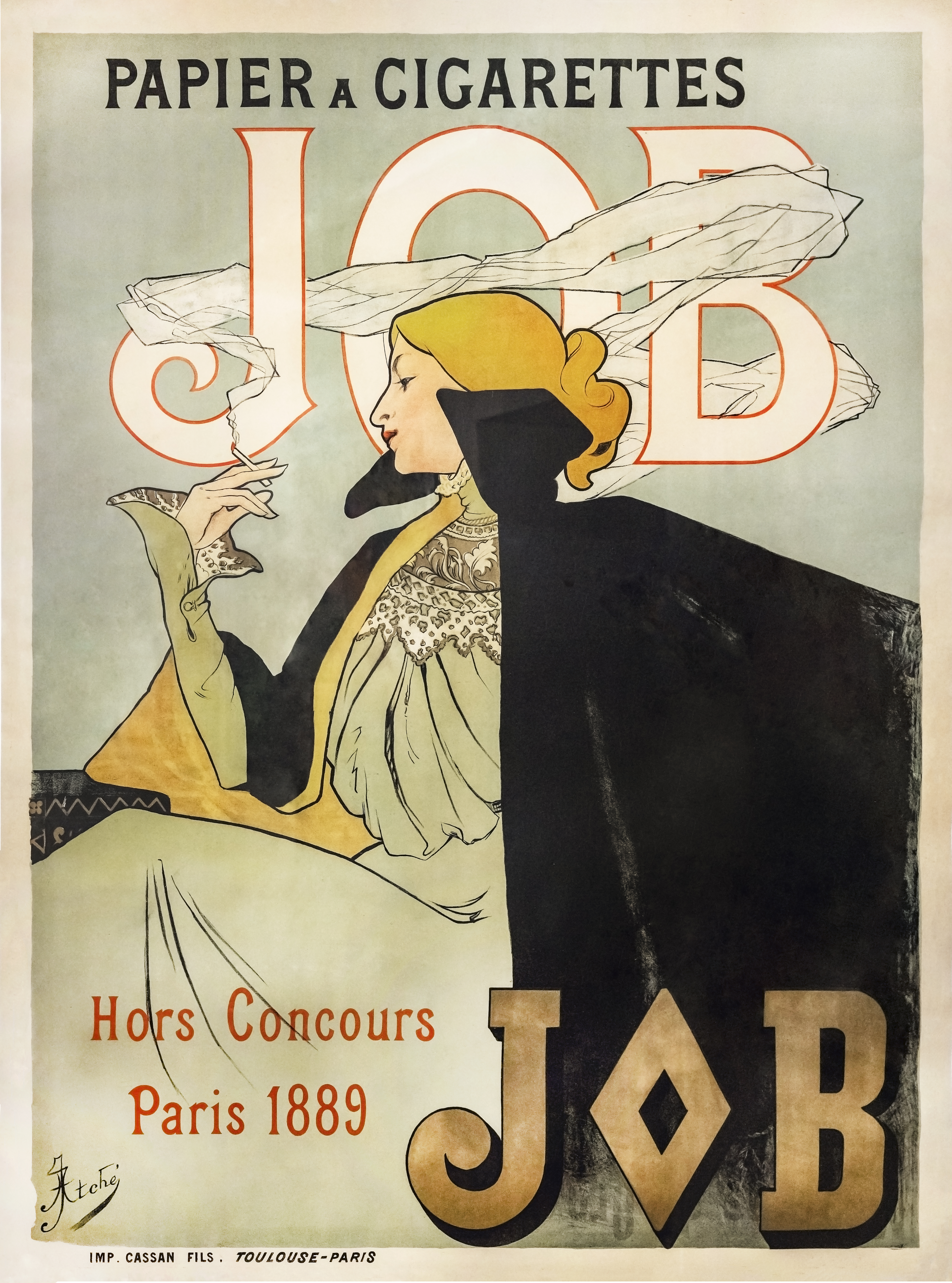
Lithography for JOB Cigarette Papers

Jeanne Louise Marie Euphrasie Atché, known as Jane (16 August 1872 – 6 February 1937) was a French painter and poster artist in the Art Nouveau style.

== Biography ==
She was born in Toulouse. Her family was originally from Rabastens and her father was an infantry captain. Around 1890, she went to Paris to study at the Académie Julian with Jean-Paul Laurens and Marcel Baschet. She also came under the influence of Jean-Joseph Benjamin-Constant. It is at this time that she anglicised her first name to "Jane".

She made her debut in 1895 at the Salon, displaying a pastel titled Girl with Violets. The following year, she created her first poster for JOB cigarette papers, which was a great success. Not long after, she came into contact with Alphonse Mucha at the "Poster Exhibition of French and Foreign Art" and adopted some of his stylistic techniques. For many years, she was the only woman among the numerous French poster artists.

From 1897 to 1911, she was a regular exhibitor at all the salons and galleries. Around 1900, her admiration for Mucha began to fade and she increasingly turned to works of a religious nature. Her art style moved from Art Nouveau towards Symbolism. Her "Fiat Voluntas Tua" (Thy Will be Done) received special mention at the Salon of 1902. From 1901 to 1905, she illustrated La Poupée Modèle, a monthly magazine for girls.

Her sister, Louise, died in 1905 and her father followed in 1907. Shortly before her sister's death, she had married Raymond Leroux, who was five years her junior. He was conscripted for World War I and was killed in 1918, in the Second Battle of the Marne.

After missing the 1905, 1906 and 1907 Salons, she presented a self-portrait "On the Wings of Dreams" at the 1908 Salon. This work was presented under the name of Atché-Leroux. She also presented a lithograph at the 1909 Salon.

In 1920 she re-married, to the couturier Arsène Bonnaire (1862–1947), an old family acquaintance who had also recently lost his spouse. In 1923, they retired to Rabastens. She became ill in 1937 and went to Paris for treatment. She died there and was interred in the Bonnaire family vault in Vaucresson.

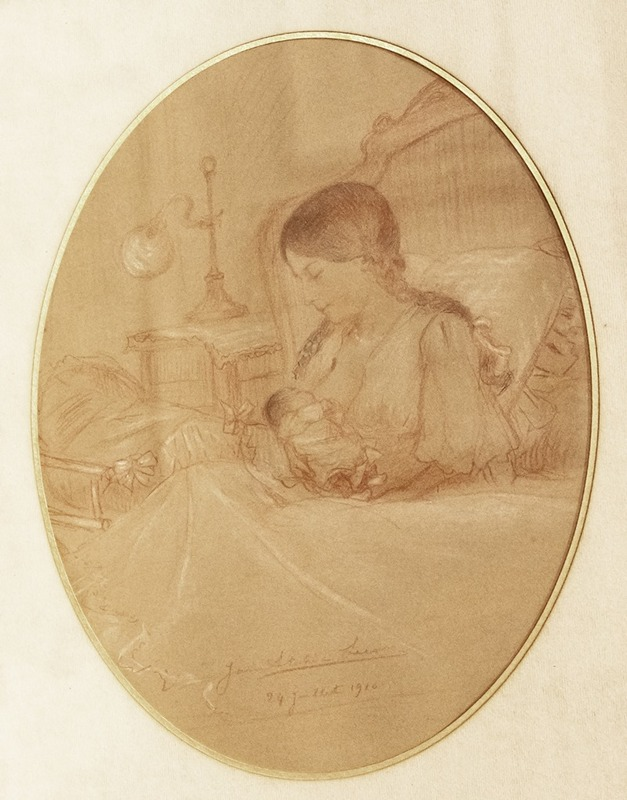
Marcelle Vermorel and his son Victor (1910)

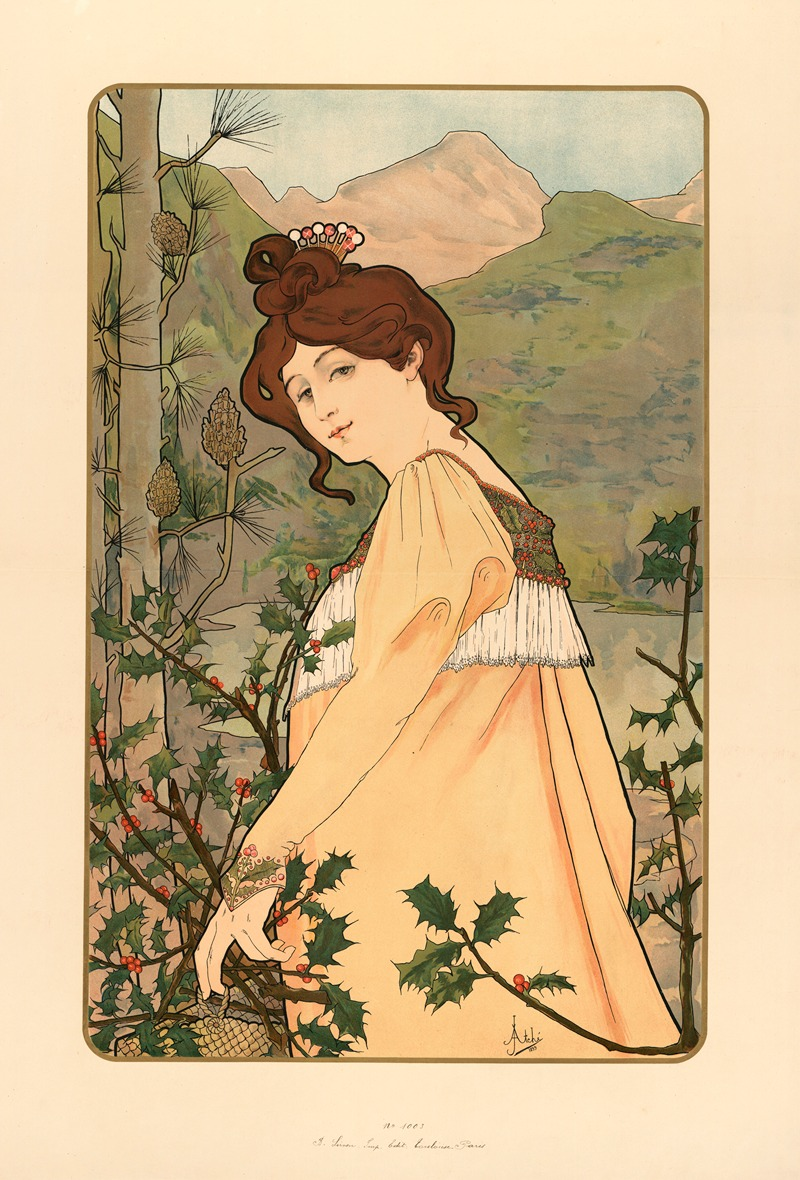
Le Gui et le Houx

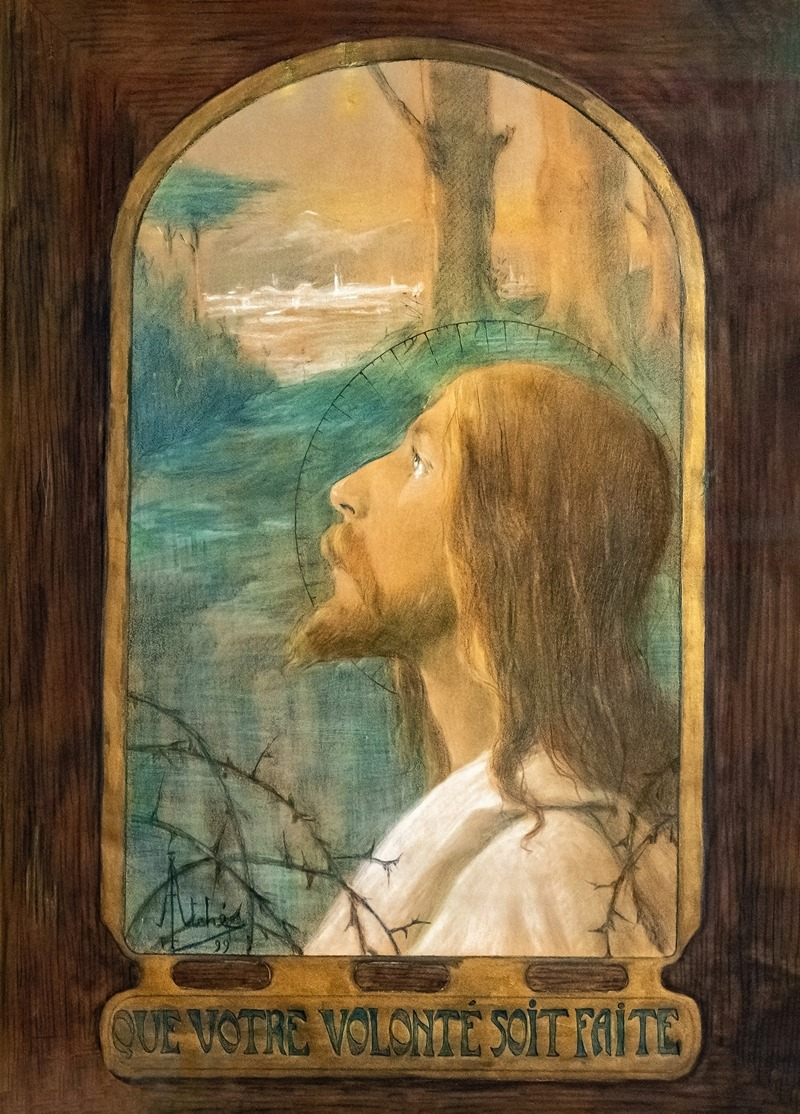
May your will be done (1899)

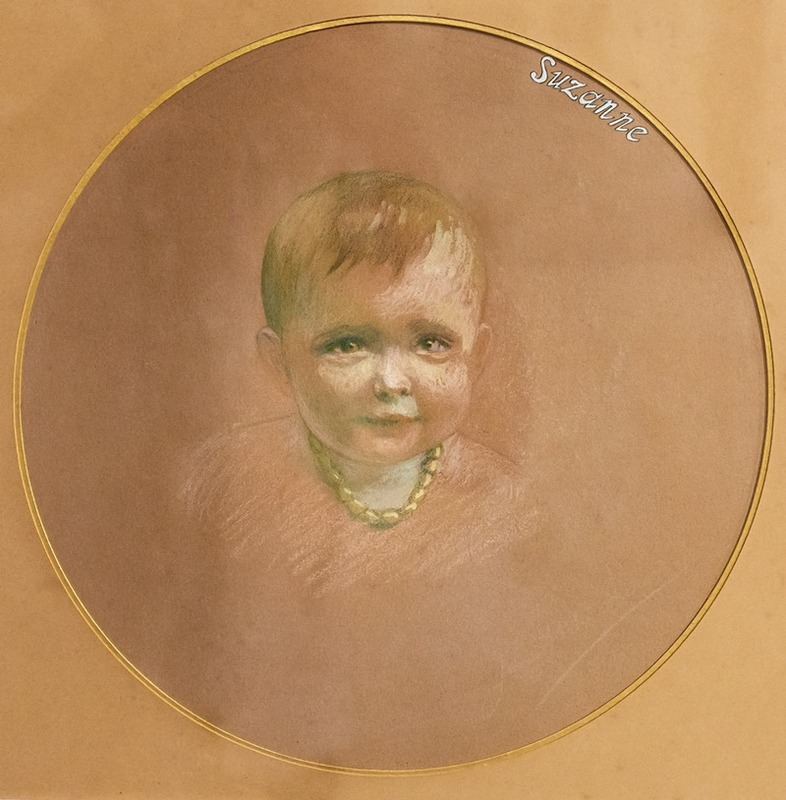
Suzanne

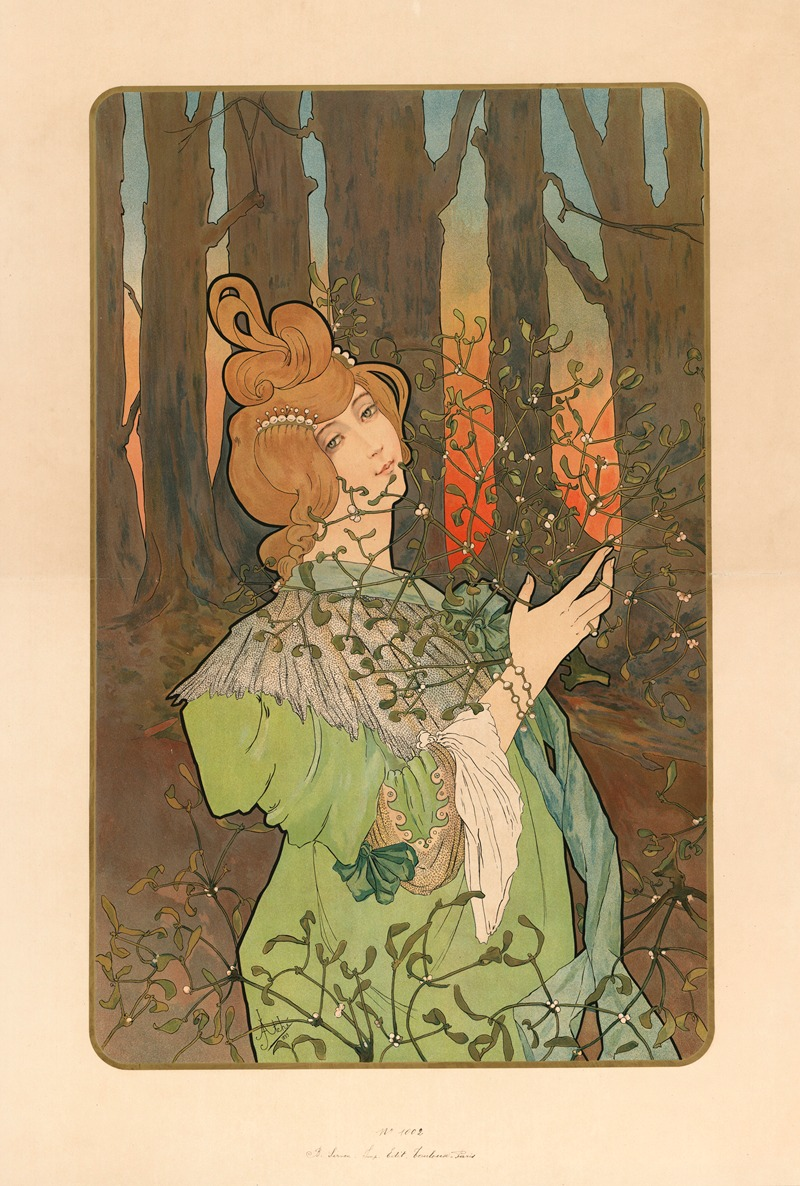
Le Gui et le Houx (1899)

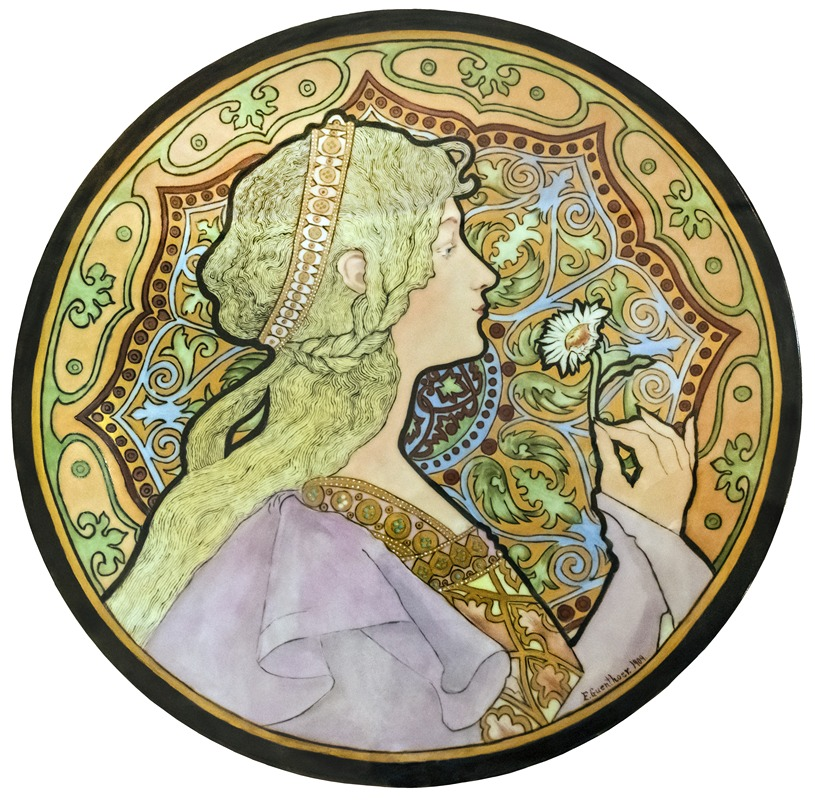
Reverie

== Sources ==
- Jane Atché @ the Musée du Pays rabastinois
- Claudine Dhotel-Velliet: Jane Atché: 1872–1937. Le Pont du Nord, Lille 2009, ISBN 978-2-908418-05-7
