= Eugène Loup =

French painter (1867–1948)

Eugène Loup (1867–1948) was a French painter of portraits, interiors and landscapes.

== Biography ==
Eugène Loup was born in Rodez to Jean Louis Loup, a lithographer, and Virginie Albouy on 1 February 1867 and died on 10 September 1948 in Paris. After schooling in Rodez, in 1884 Loup enrolled at the Ecole des Beaux-arts of Toulouse where he studied with Élie Faure. At 21, he moved to the studio of his cousin Maurice Bompard in Paris. He joined the Academie Julian and studied with Jean-Joseph Benjamin-Constant and Jules Joseph Lefebvre.

From 1889, his figures in grisailles exhibited at the Salon des Artistes Français were favorably noted. He also exhibited at the Salon des Champs-Élysées. For his pastels titled Rêverie he was awarded the National Prize for Travel Bursaries awarded by the Superior Council of Fine Arts in 1899. After a trip to Flanders, he spent a year in Italy. After his return he won a medal at Salon (Paris), married and was elected in 1901 as a member of the Society of French Pastellists in Paris where was present in all their exhibitions from that year forward. He was given commissions from institutions and individuals, which allowed him to participate in the main international exhibitions. He was appointed in 1923 chevalier of the Legion of Honor.

After his death, some of his paintings were donated to Musée Denys-Puech by his widow. Many of his works appeared in several museums and public collections such as the Musée d'Orsay and the Art Gallery of South Australia.

== Works ==
- “The convalescent”, oil on canvas, dated 1905, Collection Musée Denys-Puech, Rodez
- “The exhaustion”, oil on canvas, dated 1896, Rogalińska Gallery by Edward Aleksander Raczyński
- “The Mystery and the Radiance” pastel, Musée d'Orsay, Paris
- "Melancholy", pastel, 1901, Musée d'Orsay, Paris
- “Portrait de Marguerite Fabié”, oil on canvas, Collection Musée Denys-Puech, Rodez.
- “Melancholy”, oil on canvas, Collection Musée Denys-Puech, Rodez.
- “Luxembourg Gardens, Diane”, pastel, Collection Musée Denys-Puech, Rodez.
- “Reverie”, oil on canvas, dated 1899, Art Gallery of South Australia
- “Portrait de Madame Laurent Valière”, pastel, Rodez, musée Denys-Puech
- “Bather - Large nude”, pastel, Rodez, musée Denys-Puech
- "Portrait of a young lady" dated 1898, pastel
- “Portrait of young woman embroidering” pastel.
- “Portrait of a young lady in a veil”, oil on canvas.
