= Byrrh =

Aromatised wine-based apéritif

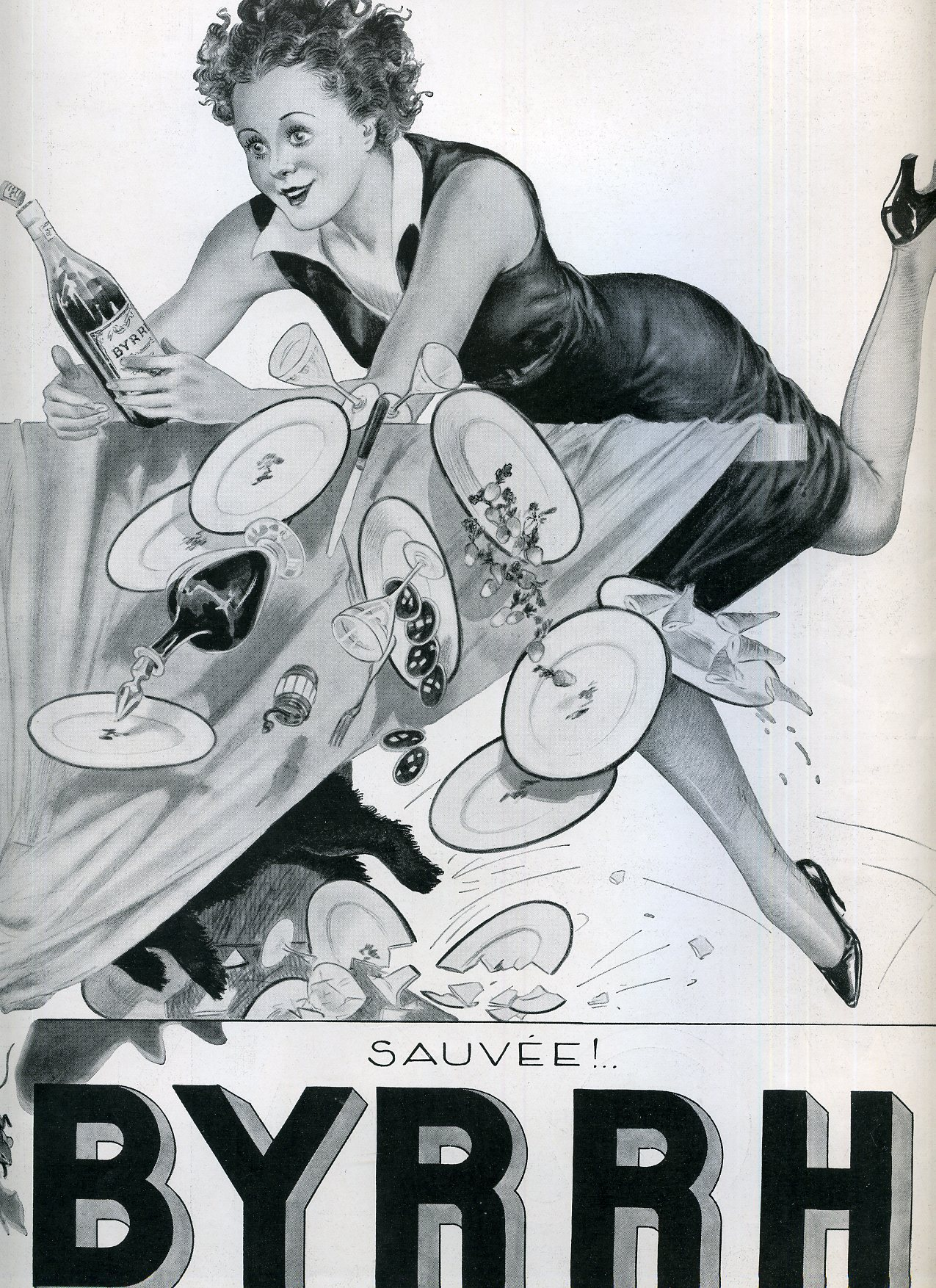
Byrrh advertisement

Byrrh is an aromatised wine apéritif made of red wine, mistelle, and quinine. Created in France in 1866 and trademarked in 1873, it was popular as an apéritif in the early 20th century. With its marketing and reputation as a "hygienic drink", Byrrh sold well. It was even exported, despite the similarity of its name to "beer", complicating sales in English- and German-language speaking regions.

Byrrh was sold in the United States until Prohibition. As of 2012, Byrrh has been reintroduced to the United States.

== History ==
Brothers Pallade and Simon Violet, itinerant drapers from Thuir (France), decided to take advantage of the wine fever in the region to develop an apéritif wine flavoured with cinchona. They mixed dry wines and mistelles and initially marketed the resulting product as a health drink or tonic. This was because the local apéritif producers were displeased about competition with their established brands. Rebranding the brothers' aperitif as a health drink got around this problem, and Byrrh was sold in pharmacies.

The Second World War initiated the decline of Byrrh. Aided by tax benefits, natural sweet wines such as Banyuls, Muscat de Frontignan, and Rivesaltes superseded Byrrh, which went out of fashion.

In 1977, the family business, divided by strife, was acquired by Pernod-Ricard. Pernod-Ricard still makes the drink at its facility in Thuir near Perpignan, part of which was designed by Gustave Eiffel.

== In popular culture ==
Advertisements for Byrrh are often visible in older French films or in films set in the France of the past. Some examples: Alfred Hitchcock's Rich and Strange (1931), An American in Paris (1951), the Oscar winning short film The Red Balloon (1956), Claude Chabrol's Le Beau Serge (1958), Dunkirk (1958), François Truffaut's Shoot the Piano Player (1960), The Great Escape (1963), Jack of Diamonds (1967, MGM) filmed in Germany, the 1970 World War II comedy Kelly's Heroes, The Wing or the Thigh (1976) in which it appears in Auberge de la Truite, and the 1998 Steven Spielberg film Saving Private Ryan.

On a French postage stamp of 1932 is a small advertisement for Byrrh on the selvage of the stamp sheet. The stamp is a 50 centimes stamp designed for regular postage (not a commemorative) designated #267 in the Scott Catalogue of Stamps. It pictures a woman who is supposed to represent Peace holding an olive branch. The stamp is printed in red on white paper.

Byrrh signs are prominently displayed throughout Café Réne in the 1980s BBC sitcom 'Allo 'Allo!

Mad Men Season 4, episode 6 ("Waldorf Stories") featured a Byrrh advertisement that won a CLIO Award in April 1965. The A.V. Club reviewer Keith Phipps notes: "One of the other Clios went to Byrrh, a wine-based aperitif whose failure to catch fire in America illustrates that even great advertising can't sell something people don’t want."
