= Charles in a Striped Jersey =

Painting of Henri Evenepoel

- French: Charles au jersey rayé
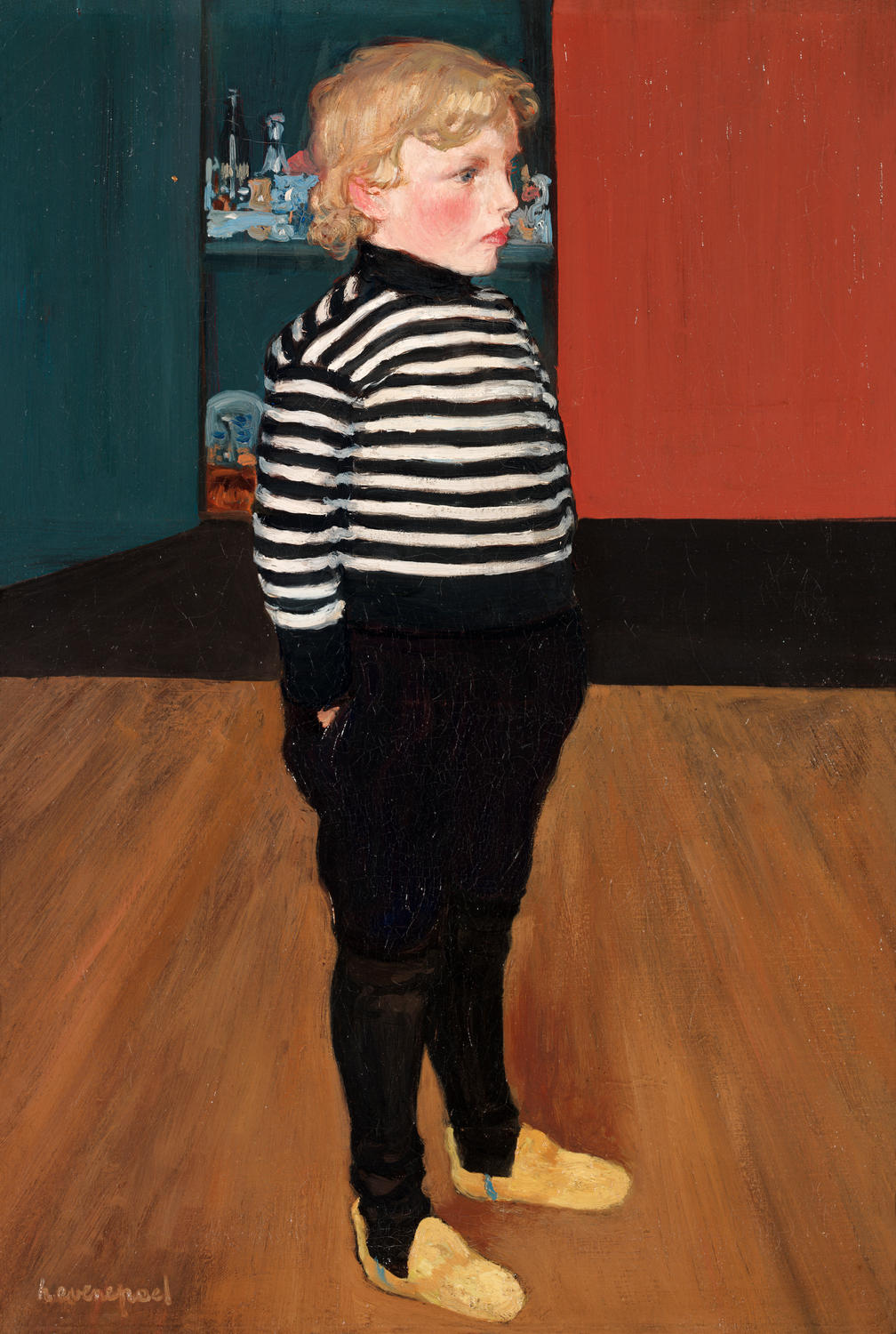
- Artist: Henri Evenepoel
- Completion date: 1898
- Location: Royal Museum of Fine Arts, Antwerp, Belgium
- Owner: King Baudouin Foundation

Charles in a Striped Jersey is an 1898 painting by Henri Evenepoel. It was donated to the Heritage Fund of the King Baudouin Foundation in 2008 in honour of Anne and André Leysen. It is now on long-term loan to the Royal Museum of Fine Arts, Antwerp.
