= Henri Evenepoel =

Belgian artist

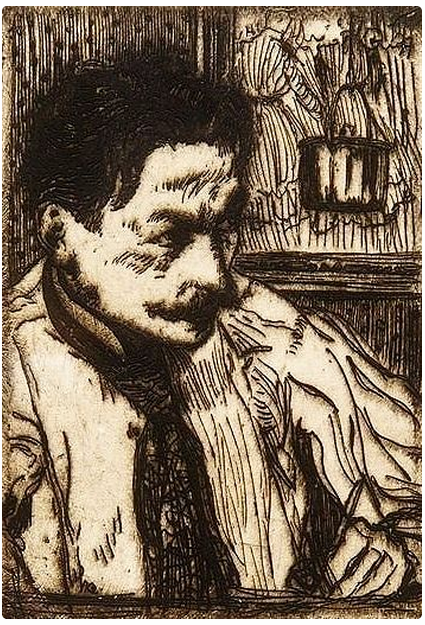
- Self-portrait (engraving), 1899
- Born: Henri-Jacques-Edouard Evenepoel; 3 October 1872; Nice, France
- Died: 27 December 1899 (aged 27); Paris, France
- Education: Académie Royale des Beaux-Arts
- Occupation: Painter

Henri-Jacques-Edouard Evenepoel (3 October 1872 – 27 December 1899) was a French-born Belgian artist whose most important works are associated with Fauvism.

== Life and career ==
Evenepoel was born in Nice. He first studied art in Brussels at the Académie Royale des Beaux-Arts between 1889 and 1890, and entered Paris's Ecole des Beaux-Arts in 1892. Evenepoel entered the atelier of Gustave Moreau in 1893, which put him in contact with Henri Matisse, Georges Rouault, Albert Marquet, Edgar Maxence, Charles Milcendeau, and Léon Printemps.

The artist debuted a portrait of his cousin (Louise in Mourning) at the 1894 Salon des Artistes Français. He showed four portraits at the Salon du Champ-de-Mars in 1895 and continued to exhibit there until his death. His first solo exhibition came at the Brussels Cercle Artistique (December 1897 – January 1898). Family and friends were the artist's preferred subjects; his full-length portraits, often against a neutral background, show the influence of Édouard Manet and James Abbott McNeill Whistler. His Parisian scenes were influenced by Henri de Toulouse-Lautrec and Jean-Louis Forain. Though his early scenes had a somber palette, his paintings while in Algeria (where he first wintered during his solo exhibition) were very different in style, anticipating the bold colours of Fauvism (e.g., Orange Market, Blidah).

Evenepoel died of typhus in Paris at the age of 27.

== Representative works ==
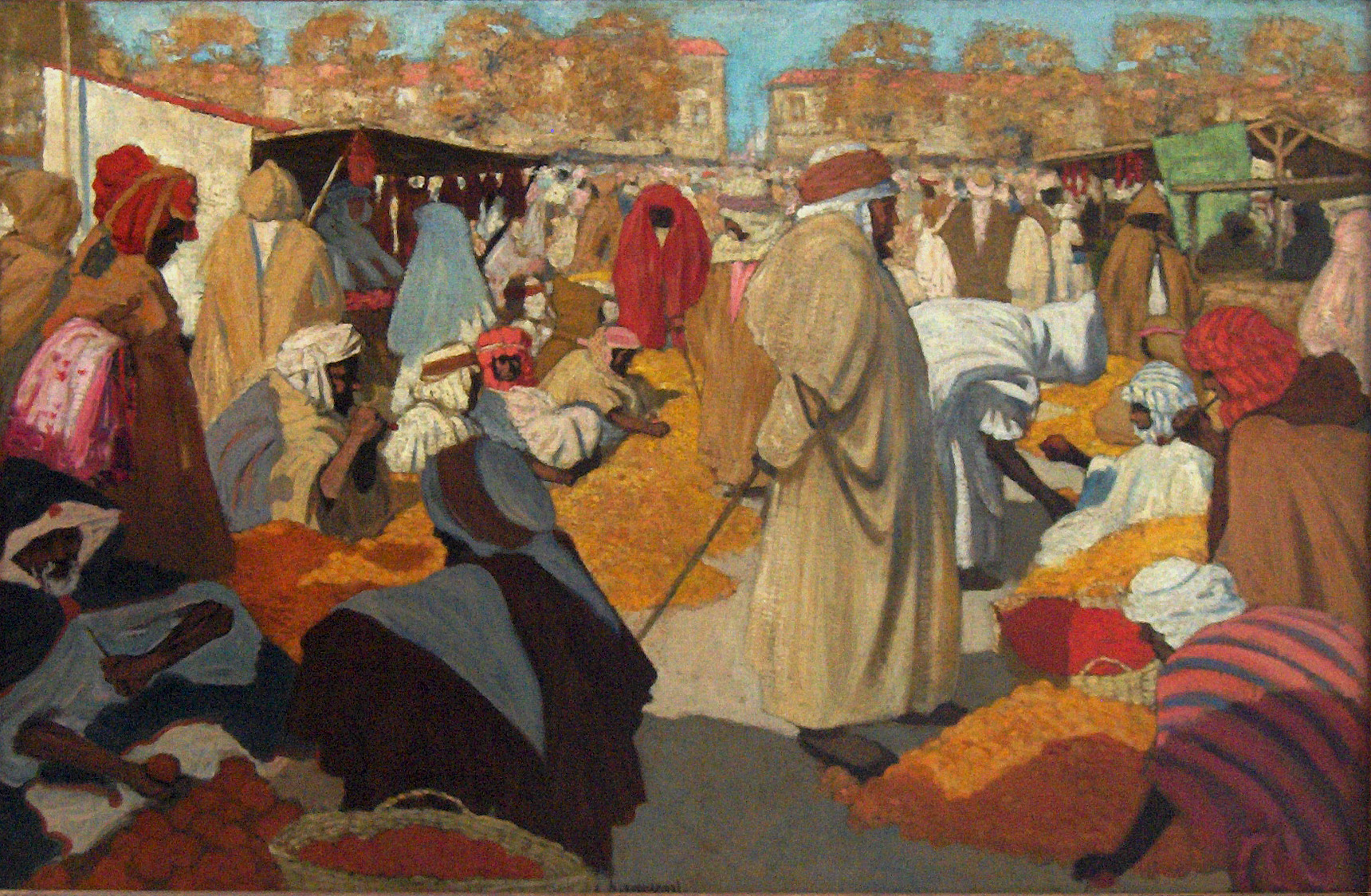
Orange Market, Blidah, 1898, Royal Museums of Fine Arts of Belgium.

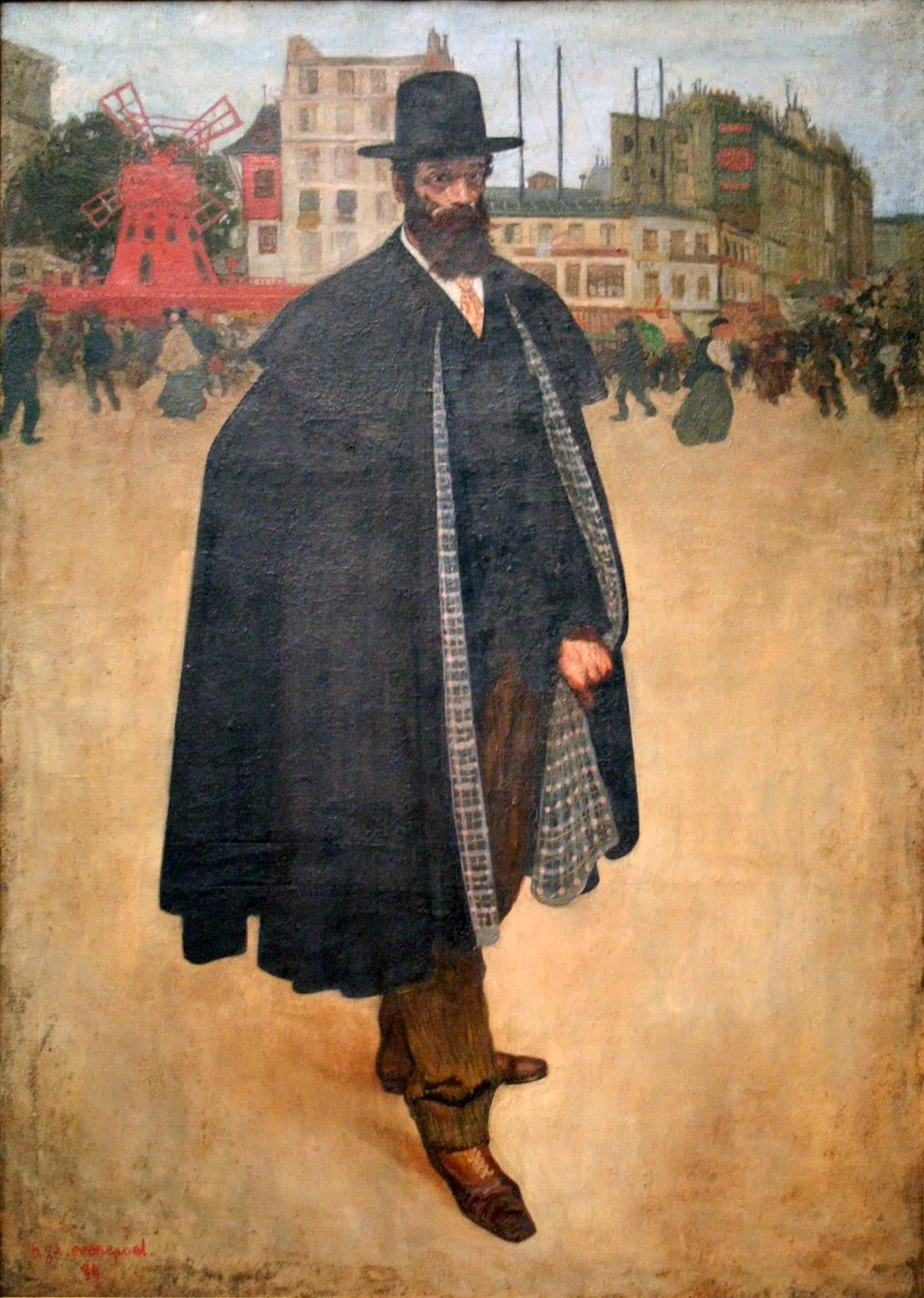
L'Espagnole à Paris (portrait of the painter Francisco Iturrino), 1899, Museum of Fine Arts, Ghent.

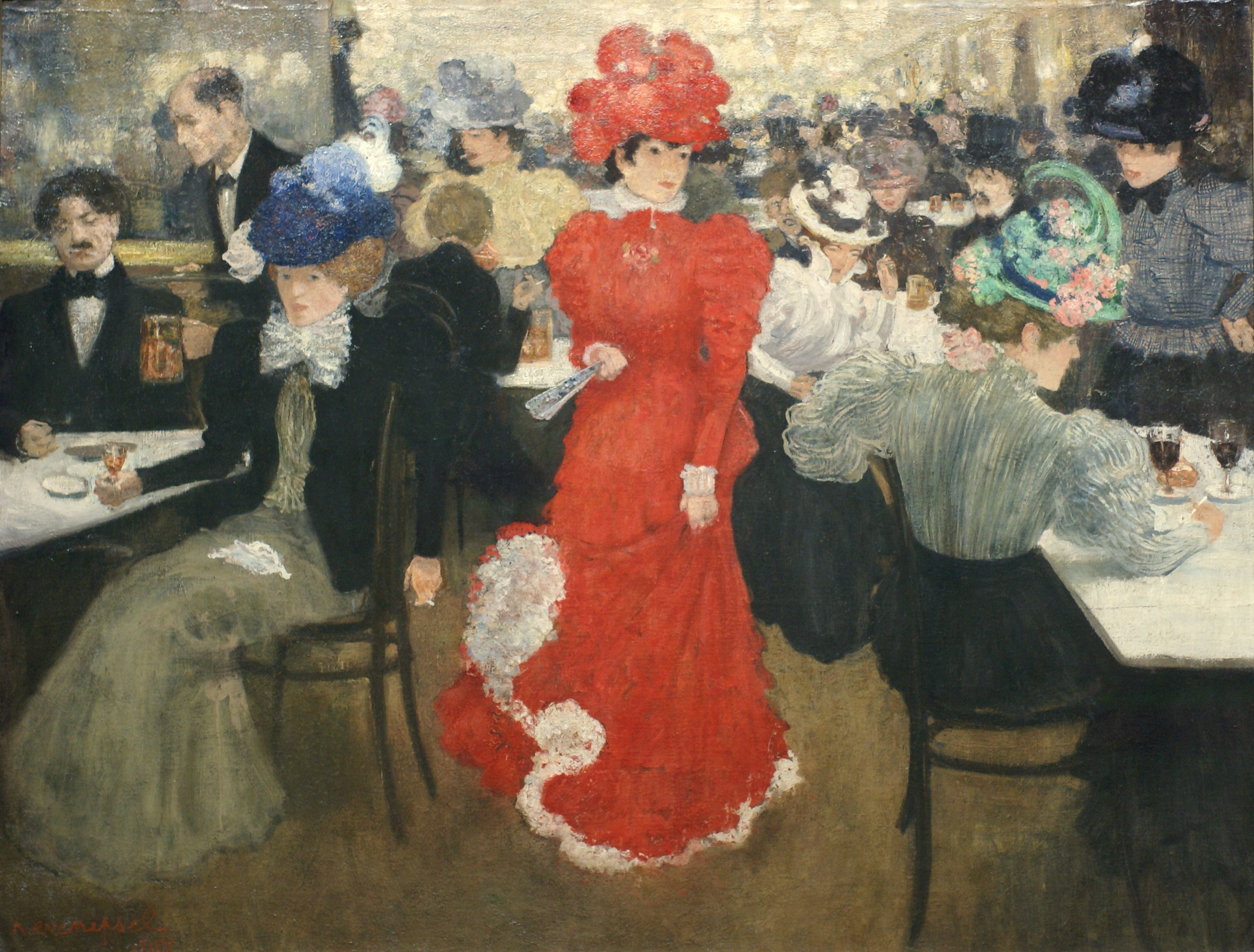
Café d´Harcourt in Paris, 1897, Städel Museum, Frankfurt am Main.

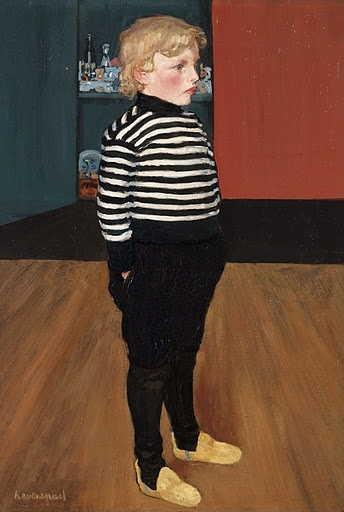
Charles au jersey rayé (portrait of Evenepoel's son), c.1898, Koning Boudewijnstichting

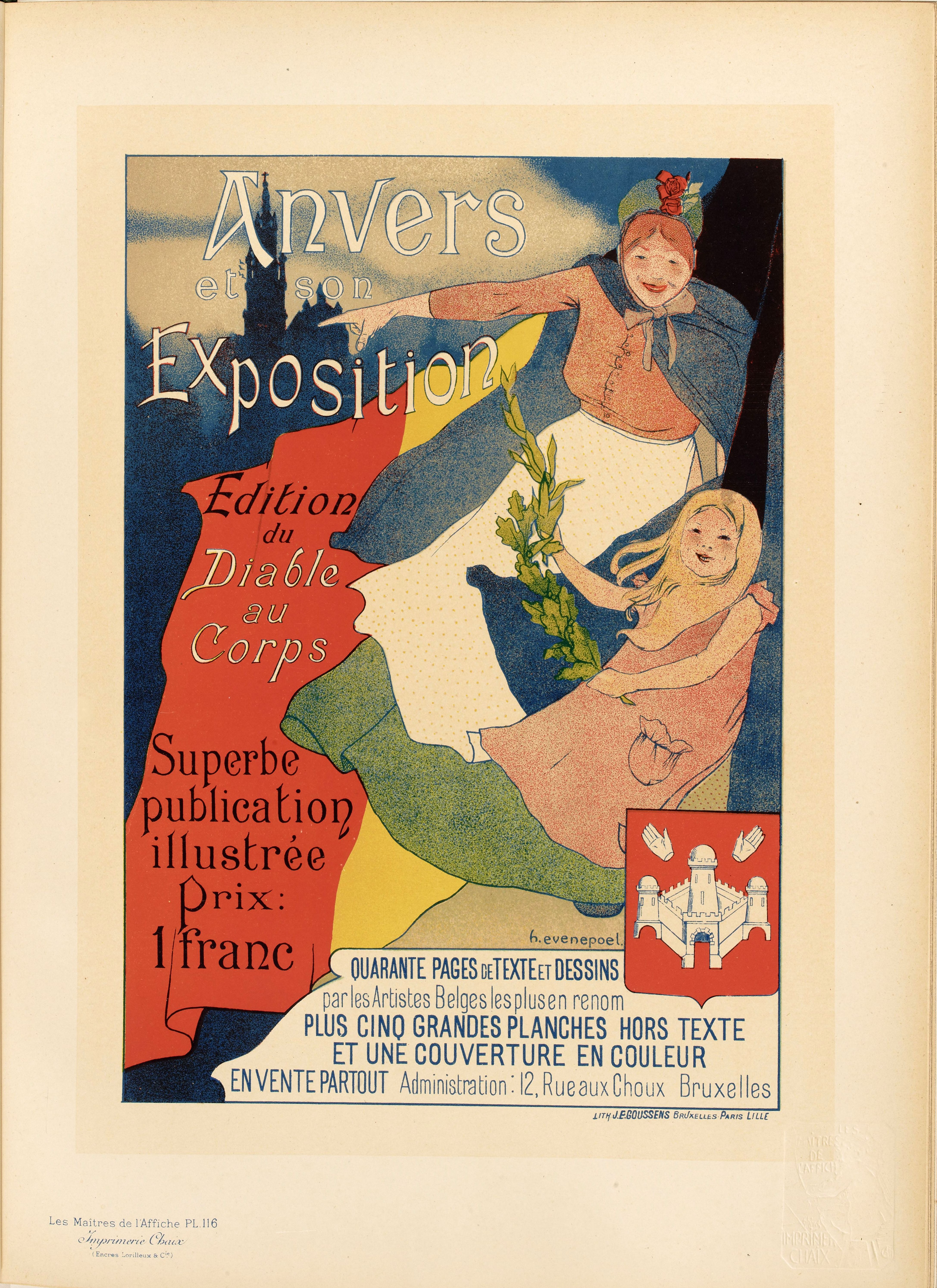
Poster published in Les Maîtres de l'Affiche
