= Francisco Iturrino =

Spanish painter (1864–1924)

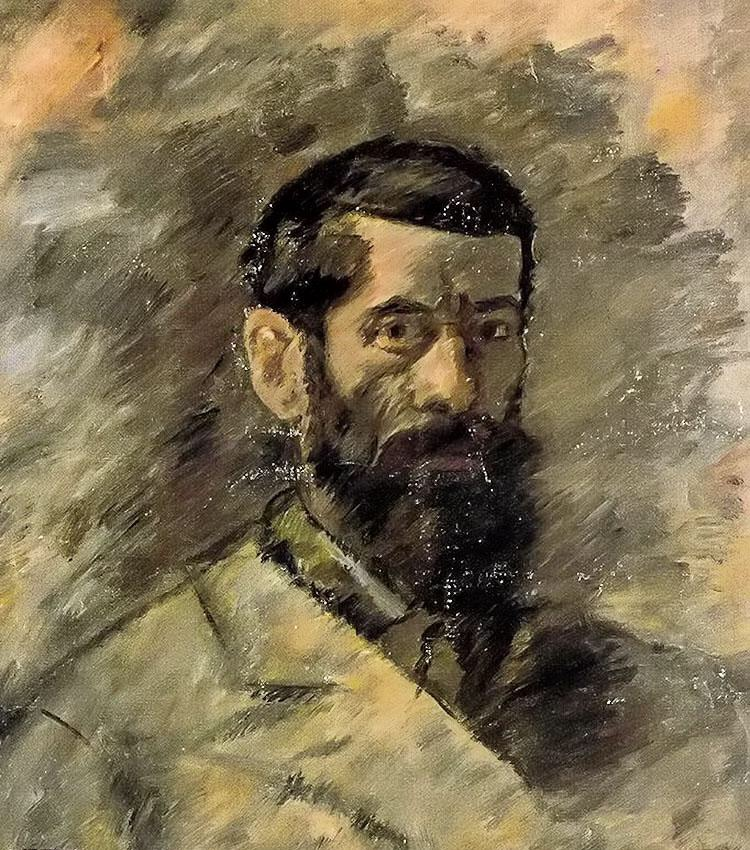
- Francisco Iturrino, Self-portrait, c.1910
- Born: Francisco Nicolás Iturrino y González; 9 September 1864; Santander, Spain
- Died: 20 June 1924 (aged 59); Cagnes-sur-Mer, France
- Education: Académie Royale des Beaux-Arts, Brussels
- Known for: Painter
- Movement: Orientalist; Fauvist; Post-impressionist

Francisco Nicolás Iturrino González (9 September 1864 – 20 June 1924) was a Spanish Post-impressionist painter of Basque ancestry. He is sometimes classified as a Fauvist.

== Biography ==
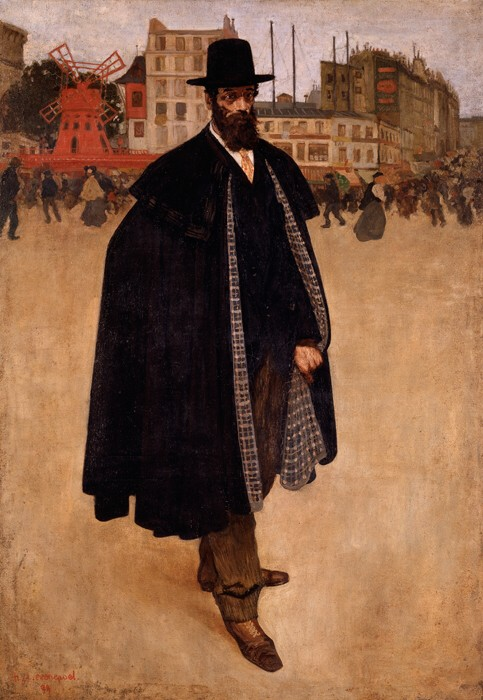
A Spaniard in Paris, (Portrait of the Painter Francisco Iturrino) by Henri Evenepoel

Iturrino was born in Santander. In 1872, his family moved to Bilbao. While he was still very young, he received his first drawing lessons from his uncle, Elviro González, who was a poet, painter and musician. Later, after graduating from the Augustinian school, he went to Liège to study engineering, but his early exposure to art led him to abandon his classes and, without his parents' knowledge, move to Brussels to study painting at the Académie Royale des Beaux-Arts instead.

To pursue his new-found career, he went to Paris, where he worked with Henri Evenepoel, a friend from Brussels. In 1901, he had advanced to the point that he was able to show his work at the prestigious Vollard Gallery, alongside a then-unknown Pablo Picasso. Later, he had a showing at the Salon d'Automne. Soon after, he returned home, walked across Spain, stayed for a time in Salamanca, then established his workshop in Seville. In 1906, he married Marie Joséphine Delwit Schwartz, who he had met in Belgium.

He continued to travel throughout the Basque Country, France and Andalusia, which was his favorite place because of the landscapes, although he also painted bullfights, festivals and portraits of women. During this time his palette brightened and he made more use of contrasting colors. From 1911 to 1912, he spent some time in Morocco with Henri Matisse, a close friend he had met in the workshops of Gustave Moreau, and who he often stayed with when visiting Paris. He had a major showing in 1919, hosted by the Círculo de Bellas Artes.

In 1920, he developed gangrene on one of his legs, requiring an operation. It had to be amputated the following year. After that, he confined himself to etching, required further surgery, and soon found himself in financial difficulties. The art historian, Élie Faure, helped organize an exhibition at the Galerie Rosenberg, featuring paintings donated by Matisse, Picasso and several other of Iturrino's friends. With the money raised, he was able to retire to Cagnes-sur-Mer in 1922 and died there two years later, aged 59.

== Selected paintings ==
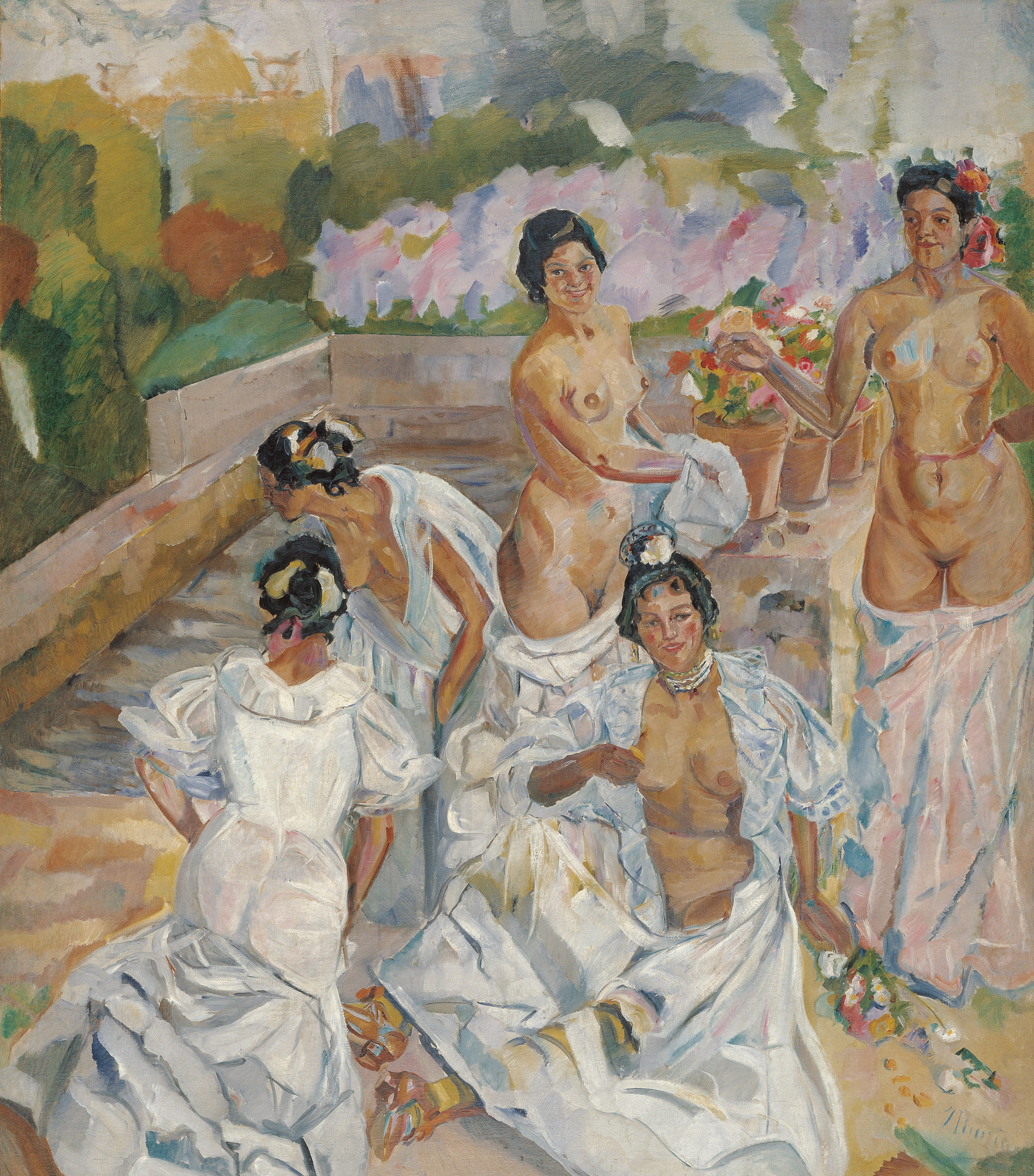
The Bath

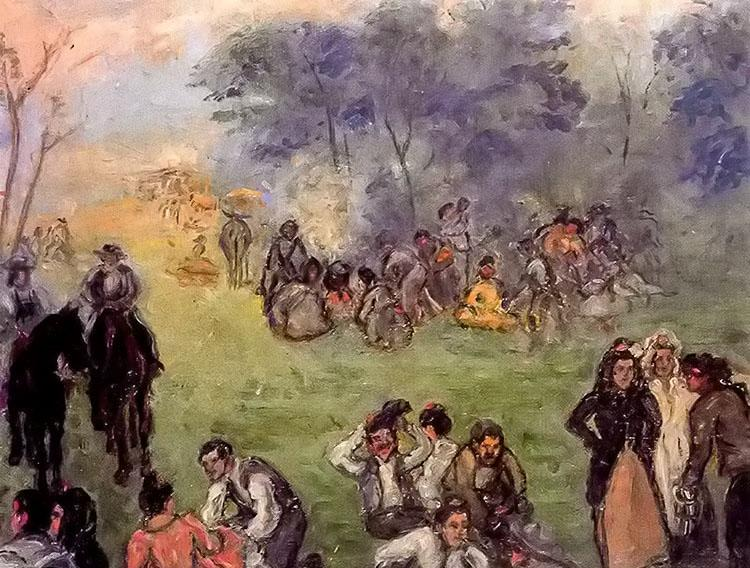
Sunday

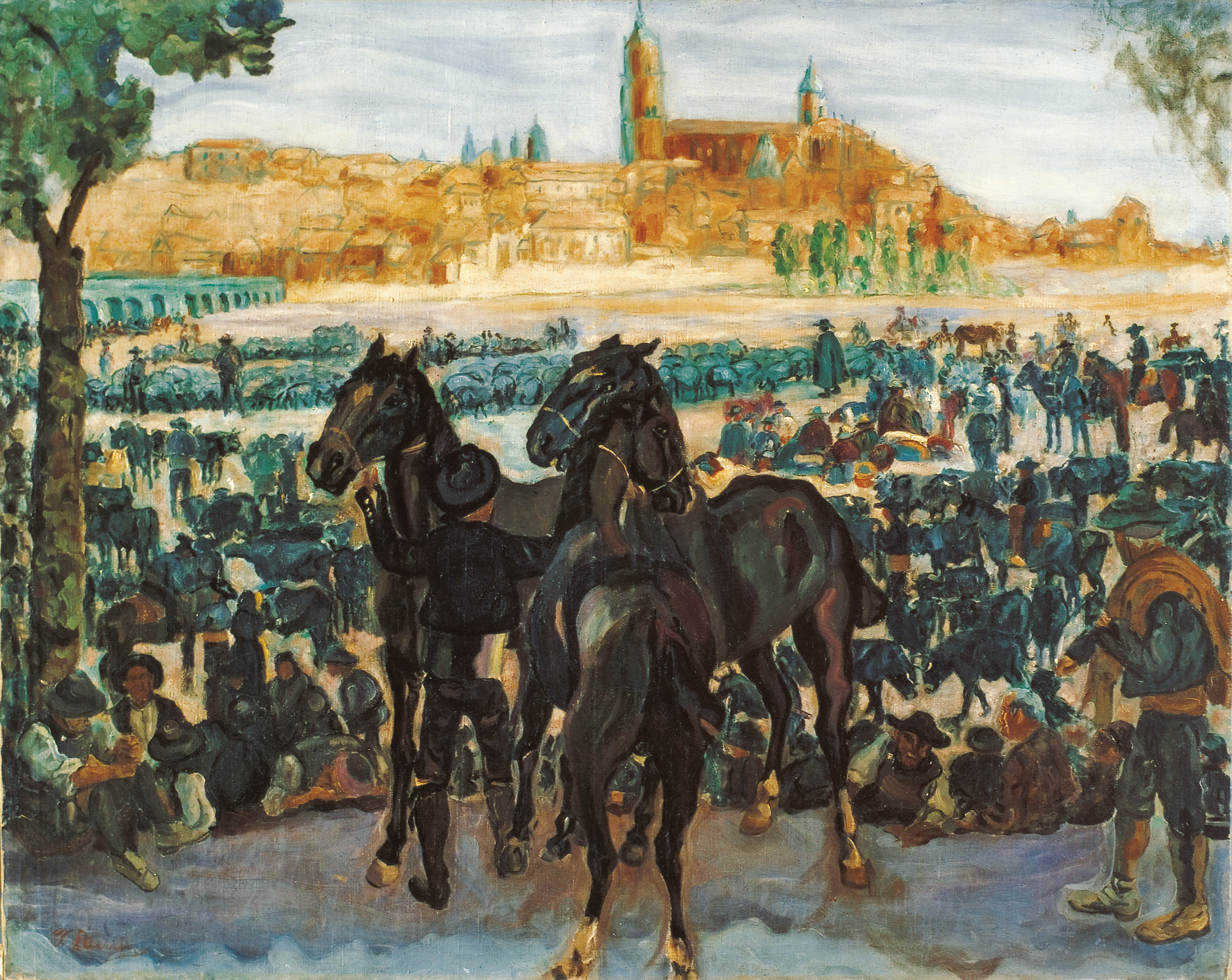
Cattle Fair in Salamanca

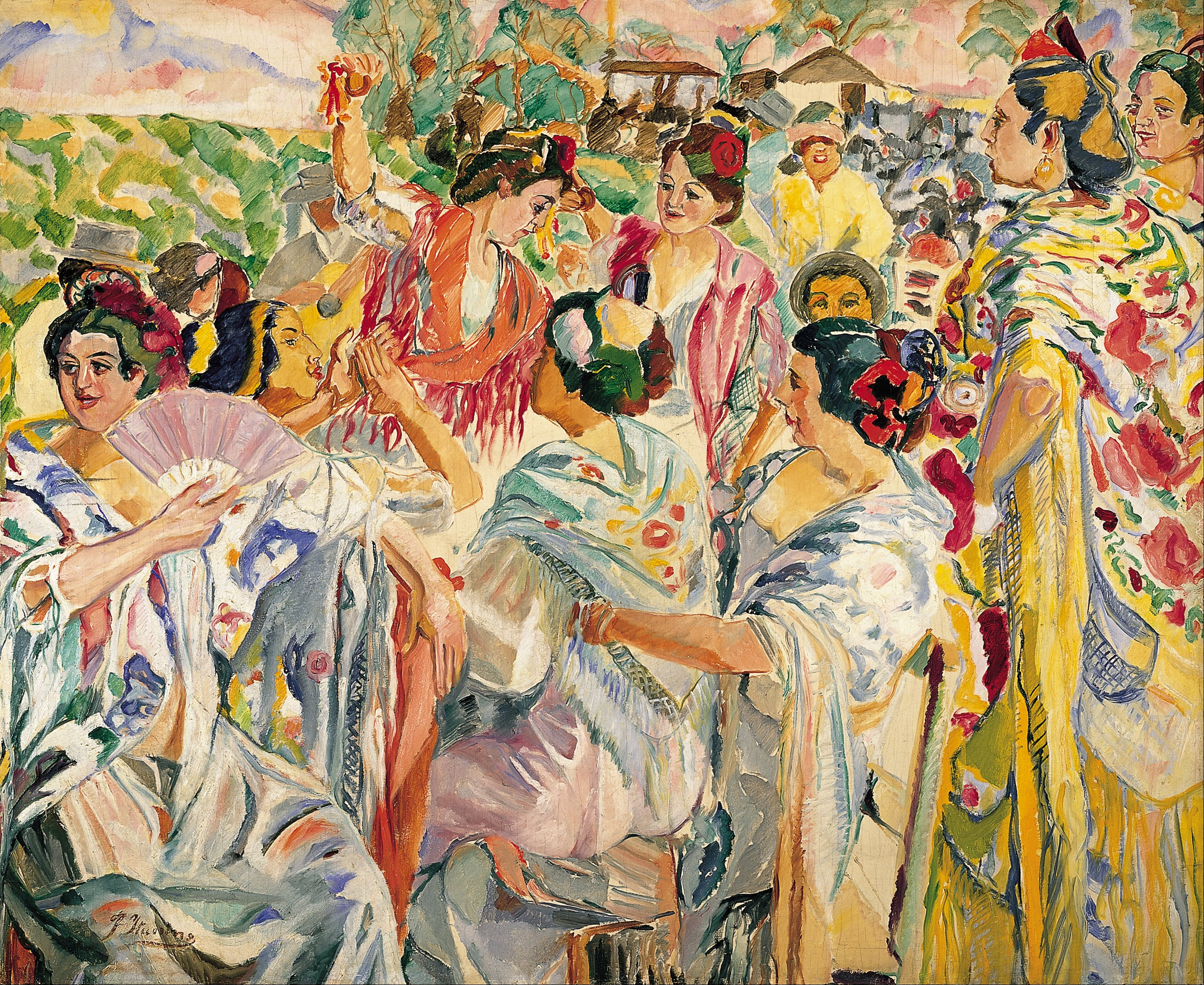
Manolas
