= Les Alliés (woodcut) =

1914 woodcut by Raoul Dufy

- Allies (English)
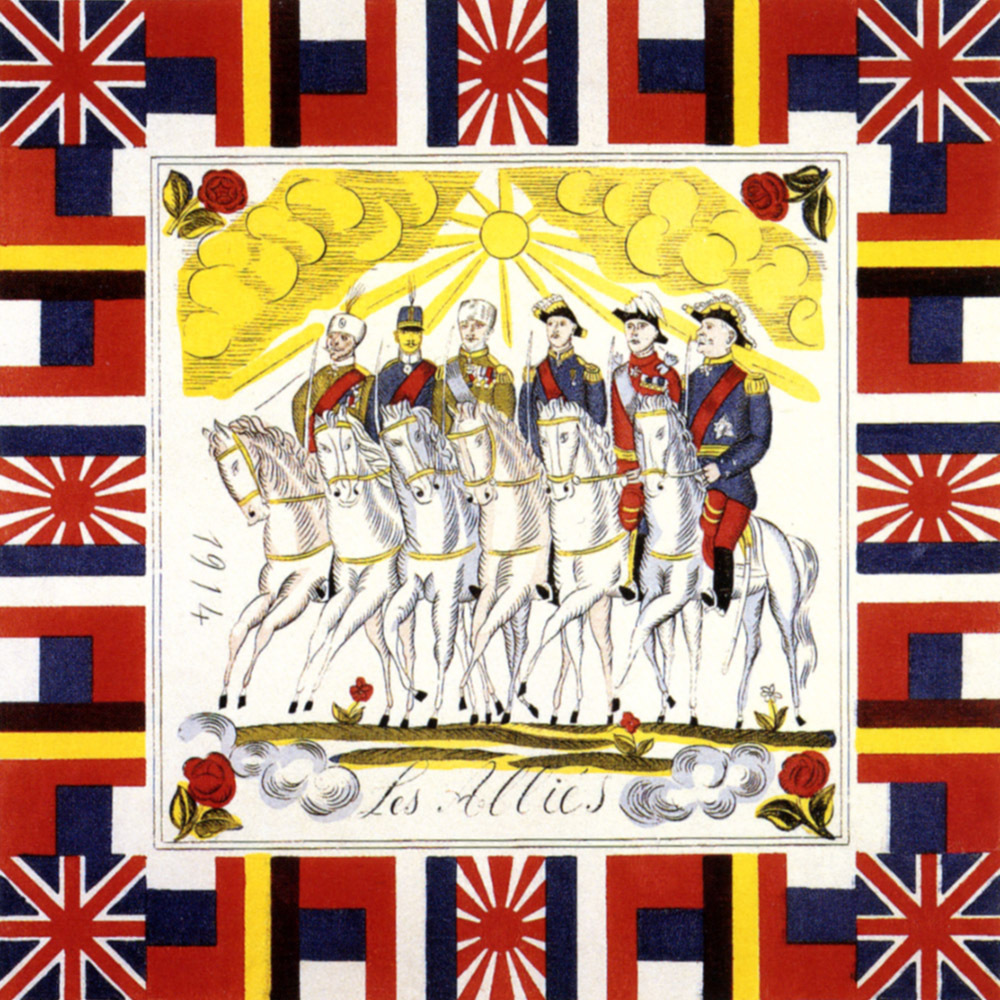
- Artist: Raoul Dufy
- Year: 1914; 112 years ago
- Completion date: 1915; 111 years ago
- Medium: woodcut silk
- Dimensions: 45 cm × 45 cm (18 in × 18 in)
- Location: Centre national d'art et de culture Georges-Pompidou

Les Alliés (Allies) is a colour woodcut, in the form of a silk scarf, by Raoul Dufy created in 1914.

It depicts six mounted soldiers, one from each of the Allies of World War I. The scene is cloudy but sunny, decorated by flowers, and is set within a square surround decorated with a pattern using the flags of the six ally nations: Japan, United Kingdom, Belgium, Russia, Serbia and France. The vivid colours, the ornaments, and the stylized characters reflect Dufy's taste for making vivid popular prints.

It is a woodcut on a silk scarf sold by Charvet Place Vendôme in 1915. It is 45 by 45 centimeters (18 in × 18 in). There is a copy in the collection of the Centre national d'art et de culture Georges-Pompidou.
