= Jules Pams =

French politician (1852–1930)

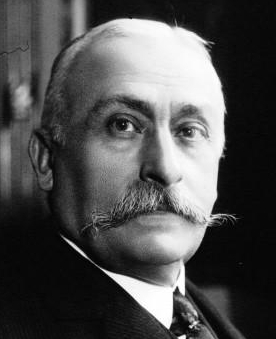
- Jules Pams in 1912

Minister of Agriculture
- In office 2 March 1911 – 17 January 1913
- Preceded by: Maurice Raynaud
- Succeeded by: Fernand David

Minister of the Interior
- In office 16 November 1917 – 20 January 1920
- Preceded by: Théodore Steeg
- Succeeded by: Théodore Steeg

Personal details
- Born: 14 August 1852 Perpignan, Pyrénées-Orientales, France
- Died: 12 May 1930 (aged 77) Paris, France

Jules Pams (14 August 1852 – 12 May 1930) was a French politician who was a deputy from 1893 to 1904, then a senator from 1904 to 1930. He was Minister of Agriculture from 1911 to 1913 and Minister of the Interior from 1917 to 1920. In 1913 he was a candidate for the presidency of France. He is known for the "Hôtel Pams", a mansion in Perpignan that was redesigned and decorated to his taste, and is now a conference center.

== Early years ==
Jules Pams was born on 14 August 1852 in Perpignan, Pyrénées-Orientales, to a leading family in that city. His great grandfather came from humble origins and rose to become vice-consul to the Republic of Genoa. His grandfather, a successful businessman of Port-Vendres, became vice-consul to Sardinia. Jules Pams attended the lycée Charlemagne and then the Faculty of Law of Paris. After graduating he became an attorney in Perpignan. In 1889 Pams ran for election to the legislature on the Radical list but was not elected. He became a member of the general council of the Pyrénées-Orientales department in 1892, representing the canton of Argelès-sur-Mer. He was a member of the general council for thirty six years, and its president for fifteen years.

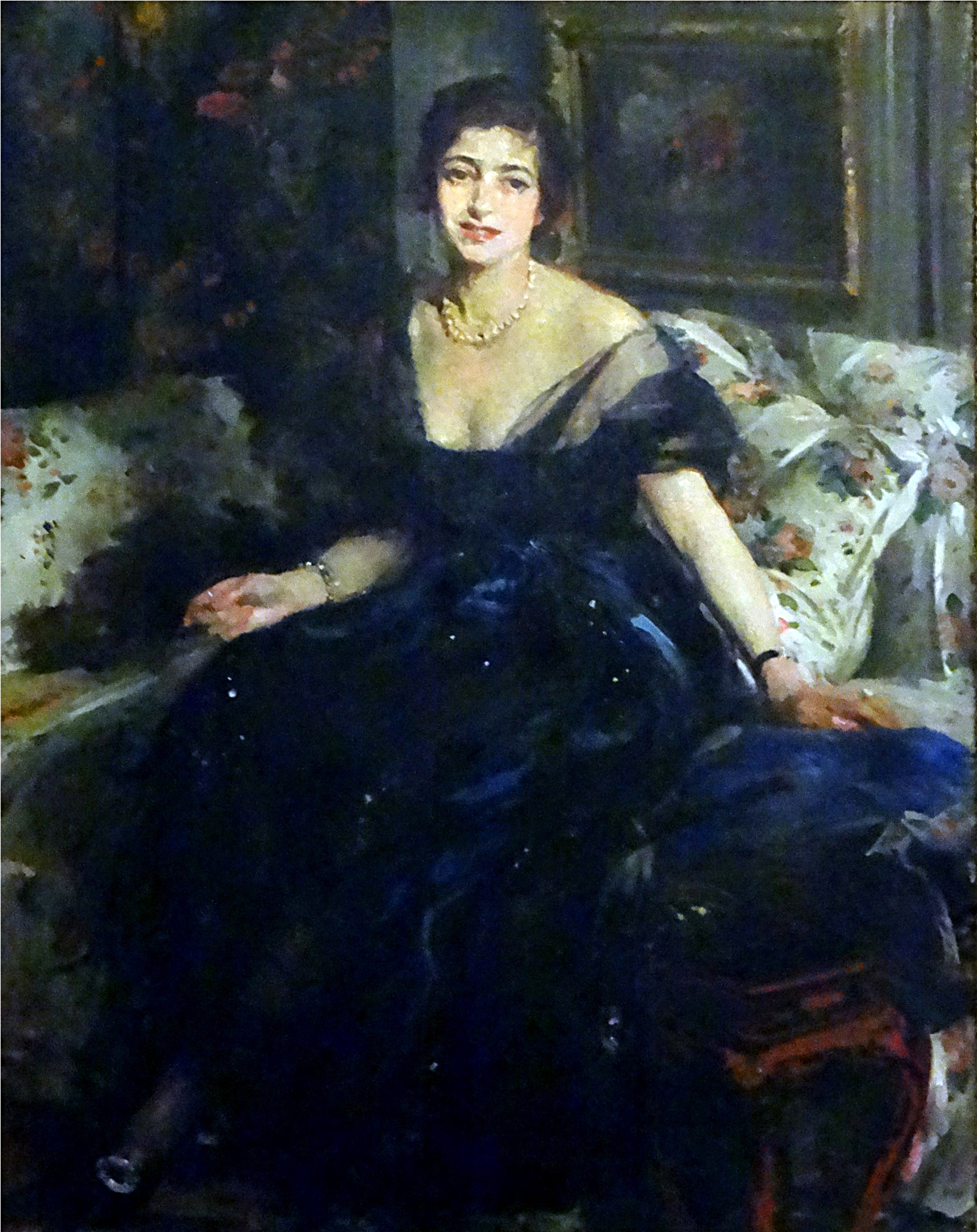
Madame Jules Pams by Jacques-Émile Blanche

In 1888 Jules Pams married Jeanne Bardou, one of the heiresses of the JOB cigarette paper company founded by Jean Bardou. Her father, Pierre Bardou, son of the founder, had bought several properties on the rue Saint-Sauveur (rue E. Zola) between 1852 and 1872 and built a town house on the site illuminated by a magnificent glass roof. Pams and his wife lived in this house, and after the death of Pierre Bardou in 1892 employed the architect and designer Léopold Carlier (1839–1922) to transform it. The renovation in 1894–97 added gold, marble and onyx throughout, with marquetry furniture and paintings by Paul Gervais. The "Hôtel Pams" became the social focus of the wealthy elite of the city. (Note: The city bought the Hôtel Pams in 1946, and as on 2015 it was an administrative building that contained a conference center.) Jeanne died in 1916. Pams married Marguerite Holtzer in 1918.

== National politics ==
Pams ran again for election as a deputy in 1893 and was elected in the first round. He was reelected in 1898 and 1902. He was elected to the Senate on 25 December 1904, and was reelected in 1909, 1920 and 1927. He was mainly involved in issues related to wine and the marine. Pams was appointed Minister of Agriculture on 2 March 1911 in the cabinet of Ernest Monis, and retained this portfolio in the subsequent cabinets of Joseph Caillaux and Raymond Poincaré, leaving office on 17 January 1913. Pams was the originator of the appellation d'origine contrôlée of the sweet wines of his region. He arranged the great naval review on 15 September 1911 in Port-Vendres. On 2 March 1913 he inaugurated the new road from Banyuls to Cerbère.

In 1913 Georges Clemenceau encouraged Pams to stand for election as President of France, but he was beaten in the second round of voting by Poincaré. Pams was relatively obscure by comparison to the very experienced Poincaré. As the Socialist Jean Jaurès said, "In these difficult times, how can the Radicals offer France and the Republic a man who has never revealed, either in opposition of in office, either in debate or in action, any real measure of ability?" On 16 November 1917 Pams was appointed Minister of the Interior by Clemenceau. In April 1919 Pams circulated instructions to prefects that interpreted the 1905 law of separation of church and state as meaning crosses were allowed in monuments in cemeteries, but not on monuments on public roads.

After retiring from the ministry on 20 January 1920 Pams went into semi-retirement, although in 1927 he was a delegate to the 8th meeting of the League of Nations. Jules Pams died at the age of 77 on 12 May 1930 in Paris after a long illness.

== Sources ==
- Jolly, Jean (1960–1977). "Pams (Jules)". Dictionnaire des parlementaires français; notices biographiques sur les ministres, députés et sénateurs français de 1889 à 1940 (in French). Paris: Presses universitaires de France. ISBN 2-1100-1998-0.
- Goldberg, Harvey (1962), The Life of Jean Jaurès, Univ of Wisconsin Press, ISBN 978-0-299-02564-9
- Jules PAMS (in French), Cote Vermeille, archived from the original on 2016-01-07
- "Jules Pams", Les Pyrénées Catalanes (in French)
- "L'hôtel Pams" (in French). Mairie de Perpignan. Archived from the original on 2016-04-09.
- Sherman, Daniel J. (1999), The Construction of Memory in Interwar France, University of Chicago Press, ISBN 978-0-226-75285-3
