= Paul Gervais (painter) =

French painter (1859-1944)

Paul-Jean-Louis Gervais
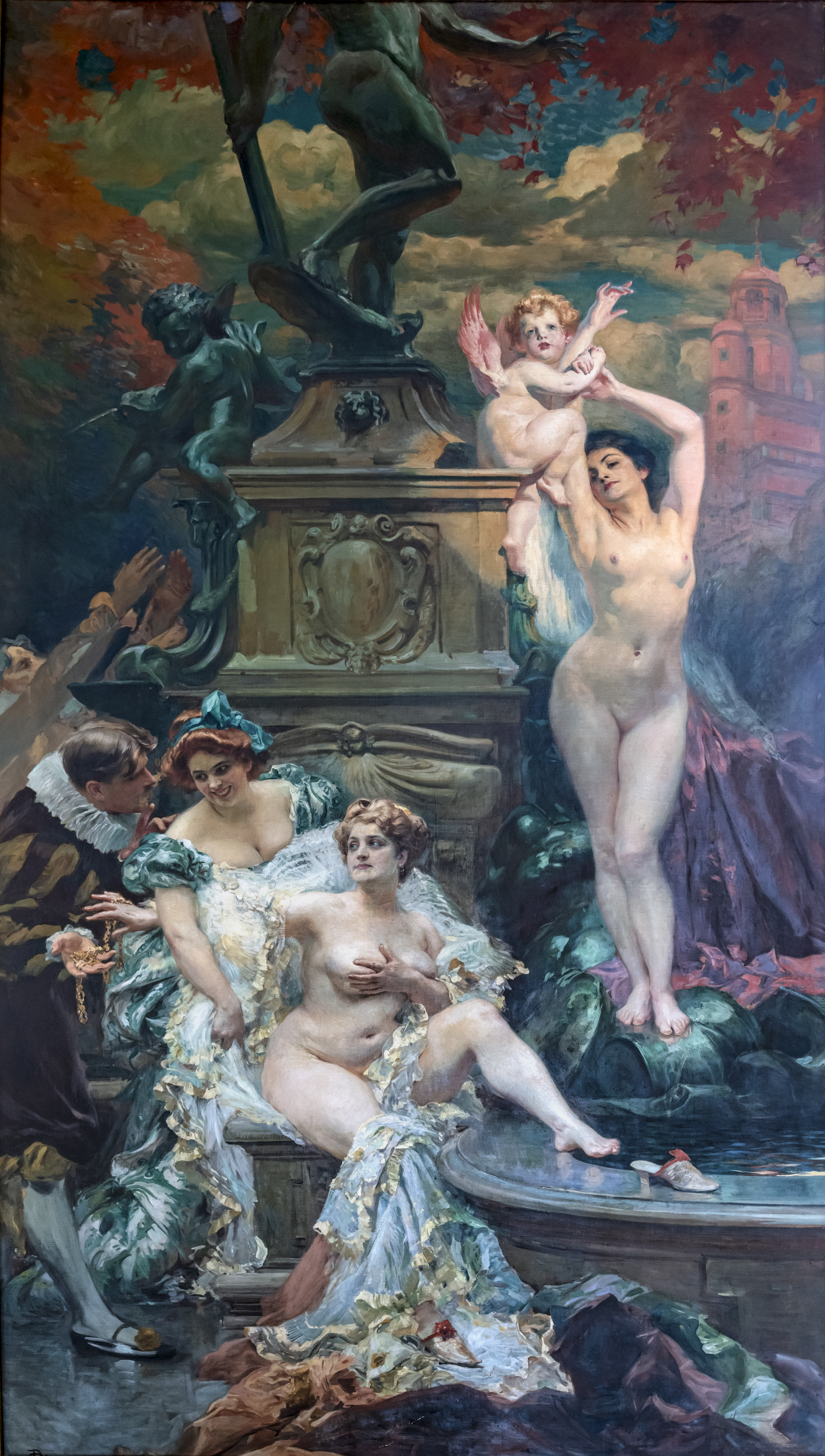
- La Fontaine de Jouvence
- Born: 7 September 1859; Toulouse, France
- Died: 11 March 1944 (aged 84); Paris, France
- Occupation: Painter

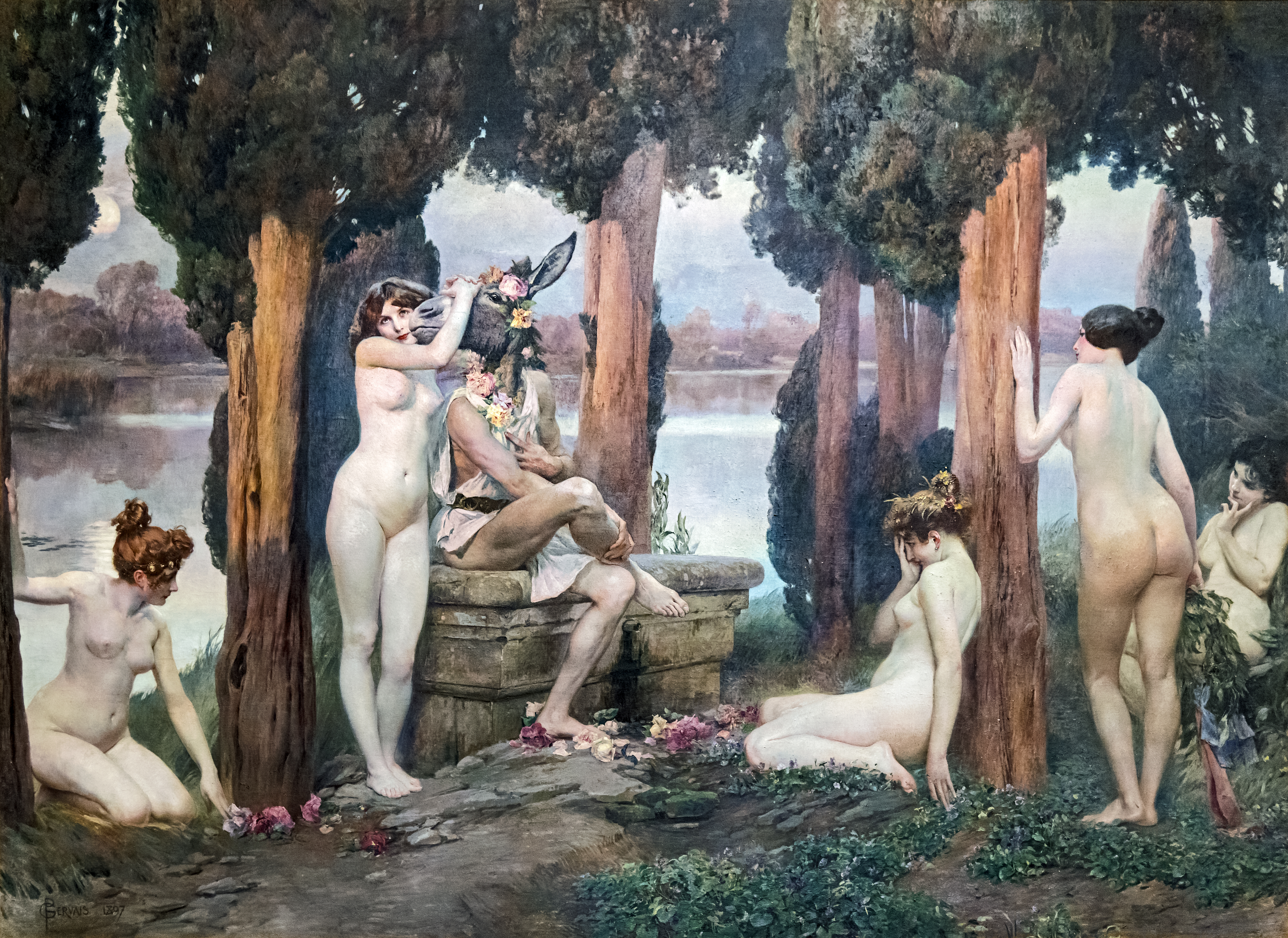
The madness of Titania Musée des Augustins

Paul-Jean-Louis Gervais (7 September 1859 – 11 March 1944) was a French painter who was fashionable around the end of the 19th century. He is known for his sensuous paintings of nude women.

== Life ==
Paul-Jean-Louis Gervais was born in Toulouse, France on 7 September 1859. He was a pupil of Jean-Léon Gérôme (1824–1904) and of Gabriel Ferrier (1847–1914). Paul Gervais was teaching at the Académie Julian in 1887, where one of his pupils was Abbott Fuller Graves. In July 1891 Gervais won the Prix du Salon with 19 votes against 16 for M. Chigot and 5 for M. Henri Martin. In 1904 Gervais was at the Académie Vitti, where he taught the British artist Charles Ginner. He died in Paris on 11 March 1944.

== Work ==
Paul Gervais's paintings celebrate seductive women, love, and the virtues of civilization. Pierre Bardou-Job, one of the founders of the JOB cigarette paper company, died in 1892,. His son-in-law Jules Pams commissioned the architect and designer Léopold Carlier to remodel Bardou's Hôtel Pams in Perpignan to his taste. The paintings were by Paul Gervais, a fashionable artist at the time. Gervais also decorated the casinos in Monaco and Nice and the Capitole in Toulouse. An 1895 book reported with grave disapproval that

Although notice will be taken of the Maria Padilla of M. Paul Gervais, it will not be on account of its surpassing merit. The artist has chosen for his subject the narrative of a chronicler: "When the beautiful favourite took her bath it was the custom for the king (Peter the Cruel) and his courtiers to go and keep her company." M. Gervais has elaborated this text according to his fancy, and in such a manner as to render it difficult to exhibit his picture in public. One marvels what historical passage authorises such a grave impropriety and so improbable an interpretation of the theme. The figure of Maria Padilla is erect in the midst of the court, while the king, who is buried in the depths of an armchair, scans her from head to foot, the courtiers grouped behind and the maids of honour in front! It is astonishing that a scene in such bad taste should have tempted so talented a man as M. Gervais.

Around 1900 Gervais produced the painting Fright, now lost but reproduced as the frontispiece to Filson Young's The Complete Motorist (1904). It depicted nymphs and centaurs fleeing from a car that is approaching them along a winding coast road with its headlights blazing. The painting was exhibited at the 1904 Salon. In 1909 he created a huge painting that covered the north wall of the Salle Empire of the Hôtel de Paris Monte-Carlo. It depicted nubile young women playing with peacocks and cheetahs, watched by a catlike Sphinx. Gervais made original watercolor illustrations on Japanese paper for a special edition of Le Maison sur le Nil by Pierre Louÿs, which was sold for a high price in 1909.

== Publications ==
- Pierre Louÿs (1896), Aphrodite – moeurs antiques – 68e éd. (in French), Illustrated by Paul Gervais, Paris: Mercure de France, p. 332

== See also ==
- JOB Collection

== Sources ==
- Bénézit, Emmanual (2012-06-21), Benezit Dictionary of British Graphic Artists and Illustrators, Oxford University Press USA, ISBN 978-0-19-992305-2
- Brighenti, Andrea Mubi (2016-02-11), Urban Interstices: The Aesthetics and the Politics of the In-between, Routledge, ISBN 978-1-317-00373-1
- Calonne, Alphonse de (1895), "The Two Salons", The Nineteenth Century, Henry S. King & Company
- Dearinger, David Bernard (2004), Paintings and Sculpture in the Collection of the National Academy of Design: 1826-1925, Hudson Hills, ISBN 978-1-55595-029-3
- Hôtel Pams, Perpignan, visite (in French), viaFrance S.A.S, archived from the original on 2016-03-04
- Hutchins, Chris; Thompson, Peter (2011-10-14), Athina The Last Onassis, BookBaby, ISBN 978-0-9570207-5-7
- L'hôtel Pams (in French), Mairie de Perpignan, archived from the original on 2016-04-09
- Paul Gervais (1859-1944), BnF: Bibliothèque nationale de France
- R. E. D. (March 1909), "Art in France", The Burlington Magazine for Connoisseurs, 14 (72), Burlington Magazine Publications Ltd., JSTOR 857828
- The Magazine of Art, Cassell, Petter & Galpin, 1891
- Wollen, Peter; Kerr, Joe (2002), Autopia: Cars and Culture, Reaktion Books, ISBN 978-1-86189-132-7
