= Hôtel Pams =

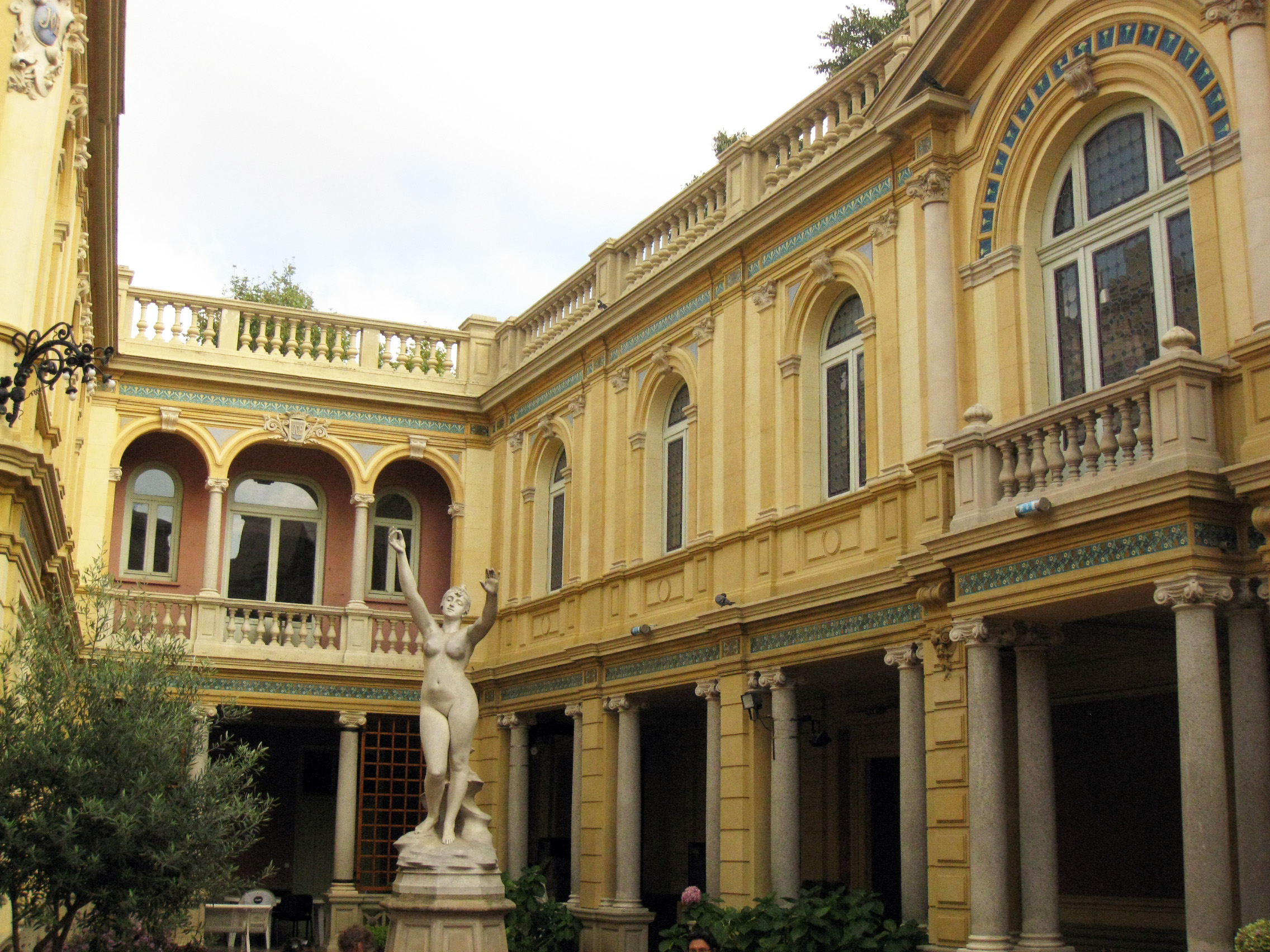
- Inner courtyard with statue of Venus

- Location within France

General information
- Type: Mansion (Hôtel particulier)
- Classification: Monument historique (1989)
- Location: 18 rue Emile-Zola, Perpignan, Languedoc-Roussillon, France
- Coordinates: 42.697900°N 2.898311°E
- Owner: City of Perpignon

Renovating team
- Architect: Léopold Carlier

The Hôtel Pams is a mansion in Perpignan, Pyrénées-Orientales, France. It was built between 1852 and 1872 by Pierre Bardou, one of the founders of the JOB cigarette paper company, then transformed in the 1890s into an elegant mansion by his son-in-law Jules Pams, a politician and amateur art-lover. It illustrates the artistic taste of the wealthy bourgeois at the turn of the 20th century. Today the building is owned by the city of Perpignan, and is only occasionally open to the public.

== Origins ==
Pierre Bardou (1826–92) and his father Jean Bardou founded the JOB cigarette paper company, whose name is taken from Jean Bardou's initials. Pierre Bardou bought several houses in Perpignan on the Rue Émile Zola between 1852 and 1872, where he built workshops lit by a magnificent skylight adjacent to his home, which was enlarged to become a mansion. In practice the factory and the private space were not clearly separated. Pierre's wife, Léonie Amiel, died in 1871 leaving three children. His sister-in-law, Henriette Amiel, moved into the mansion on 18 rue Saint-Sauveur in Perpignan to care for them. In 1888 the politician Jules Pams married Jeanne Bardou. Jeanne was Pierre Bardou's youngest child, and would inherit the property. The Pams' lived in the house. While Pierre Bardou was an enthusiastic collector of "curiosities", Jules Pams was an enlightened amateur and patron of contemporary art, and in effect became Bardou's artistic adviser.

== Development ==
After Pierre Bardou-Job died in 1892 Pams commissioned the architect and designer Léopold Carlier to remodel the mansion to his taste. The renovation in 1894–97 added gold, marble and onyx throughout, with marquetry furniture. The paintings were by Paul Gervais, a fashionable artist at the time. Gervais decorated the casinos in Monaco and Nice and the Capitole in Toulouse. His paintings celebrate seductive women, love, and the virtues of civilization.

The Pams' were childless, but Henriette Amiel stayed in the house and looked after Pierre Michel Bardou (1887–1937), son of Jeanne's brother Justin Bardou (1860–1930). The "Hôtel Pams" became the social focus of the wealthy elite of the city. Jules Pams used the left wing as his private house and the right wing for receiving visitors. By the turn of the 20th century the Hôtel Pams was a large private museum, rivaling Perpignan's public Musée des Beaux-Arts Hyacinthe Rigaud. Jules Pams was administrator of the Musée des Beaux-Arts. Pams' wife Jeanne died in 1916. In 1918 he married again, to Marguerite Holtzer. Pams died in 1930. In 1946 Marguerite sold the building to the city of Perpignan.

On 8 June 1989 part of the building was designated a monument historique. The protected parts are the interior court, vestibule, stairwell, facades, roofs and interior decoration by the architects Léopold Carlier and Viggo Dorph-Petersen, and the painters Paul Gervais and Henri Gervex. As of 2015 it was being used for offices and as a conference center. The Hôtel Pams is generally closed to the public apart from the Visa Pour L'Image exposition in the first two weeks of September, and the European Heritage Days, also in September.

== Building ==
The building has a square plan, with two floors above the ground level and an attic. There are eight window bays on the main street facade, with rectangular frames on the first two levels and curved bays on the second level. Each bay on the second level opens onto a private balcony. Due to the sloping ground, the rear of the first floor above the street entrance opens onto a ground-level inner court lined on two sides by a portico with alternating Ionic columns and sections of wall. Above one side of the inner court there is a long gallery lit by seven bays with semi-circular arches. In the center of the inner court there is a marble nymph signed Bastet (1896). In the main court a ceramic frieze with floral decoration on the wall provides a background to a bronze statue of a young flute player.

Inside, the entrance hall and grand stairway are richly decorated. Above the hall is a cupola lit by a large conical lantern. On the first and second floors painted panels alternate with doors and windows. The first floor panels depict allegories, while those on the second floor depict maritime scenes, perhaps connected with the shipping activities of the Pams family.

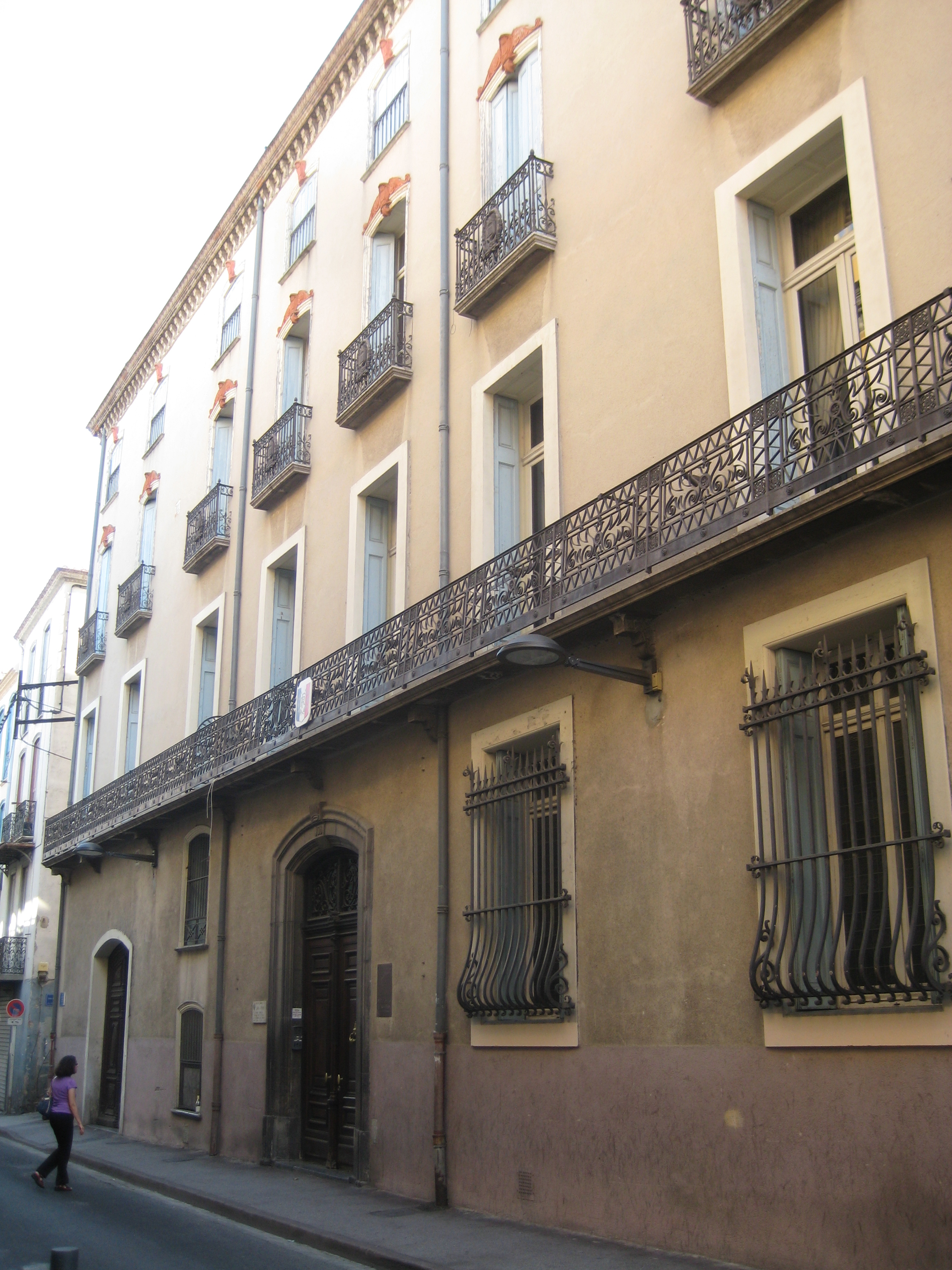
Facade

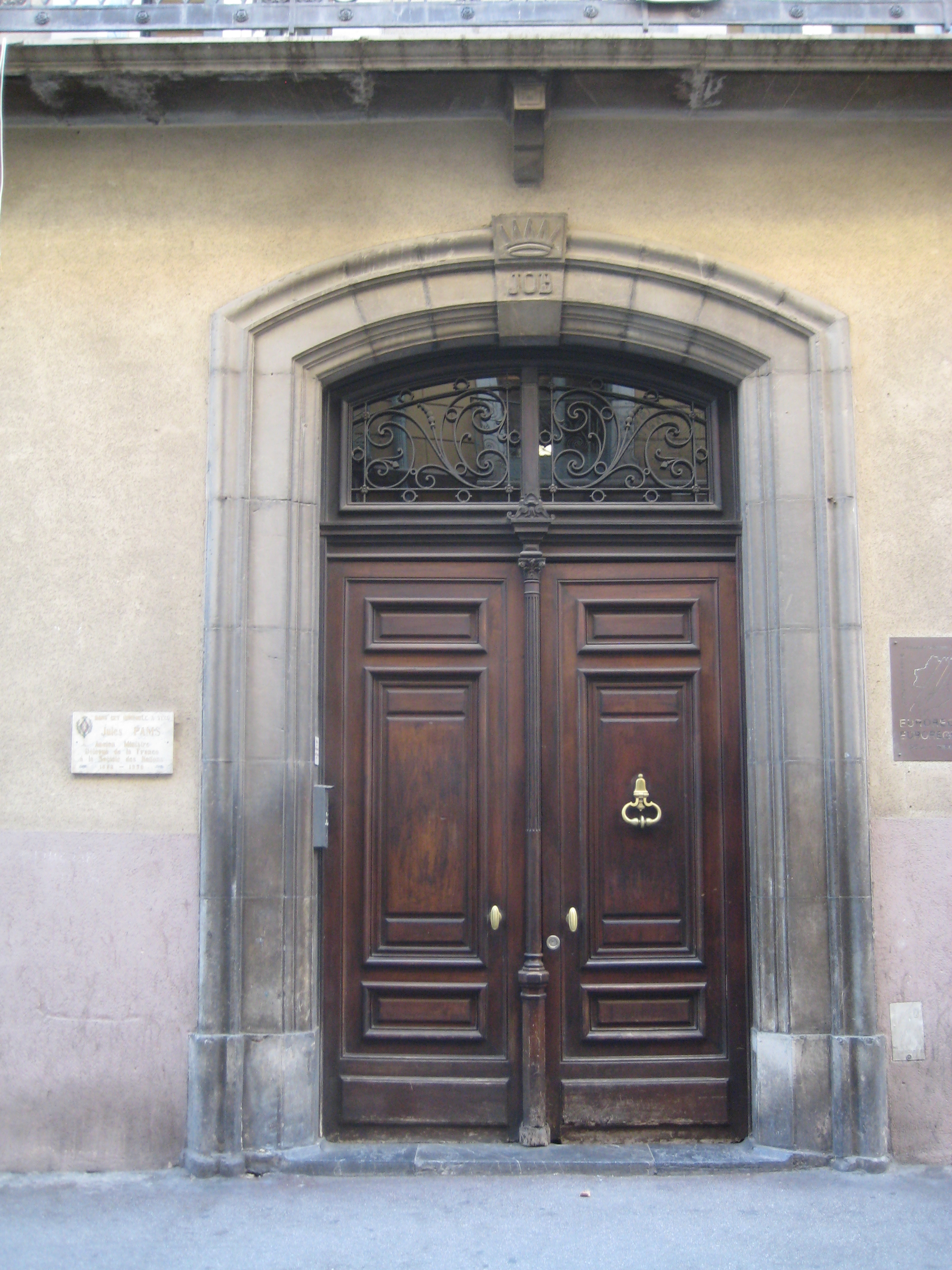
Entrance

Main court

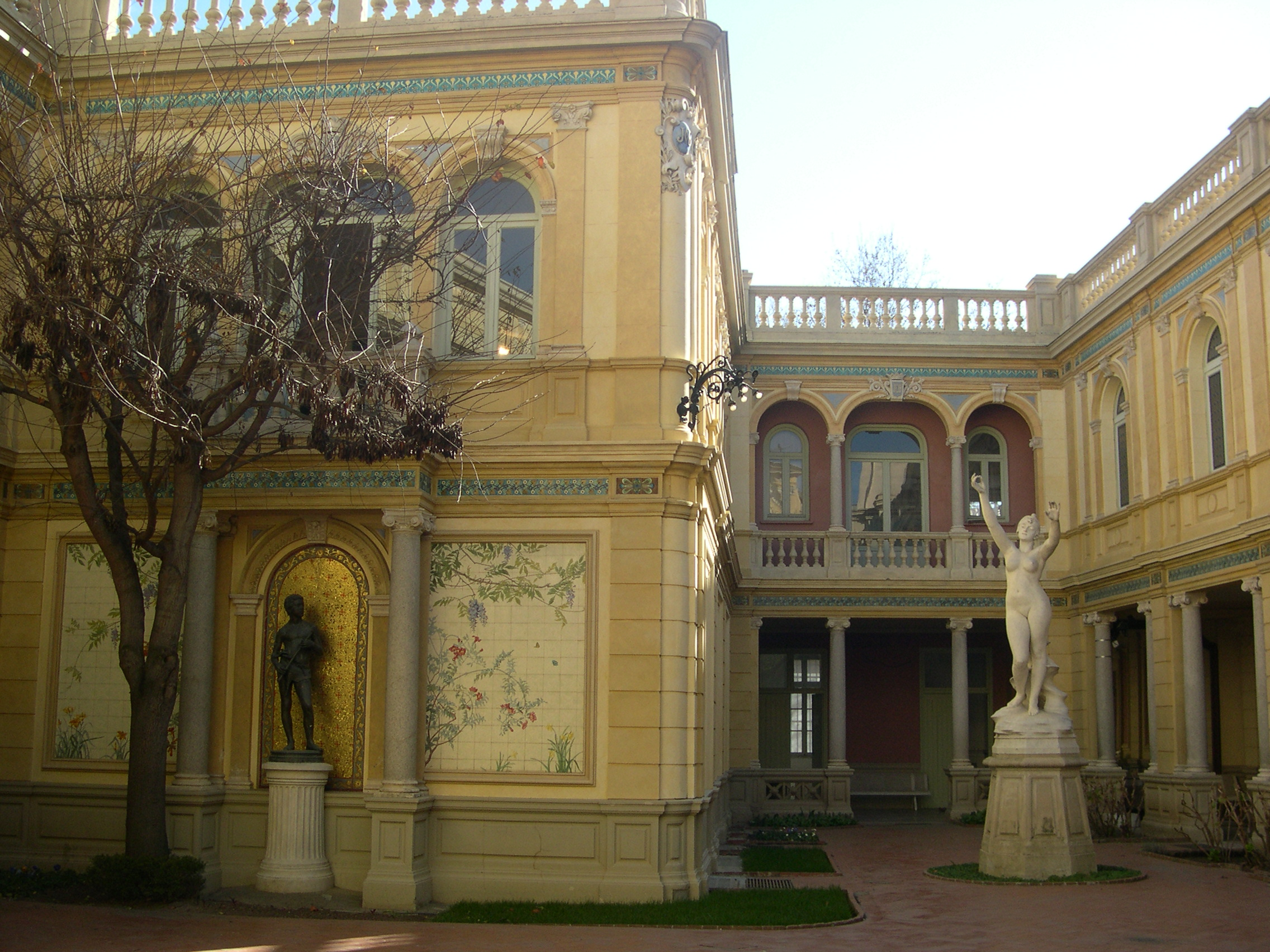
Statues of Pan, and Nymph in inner court

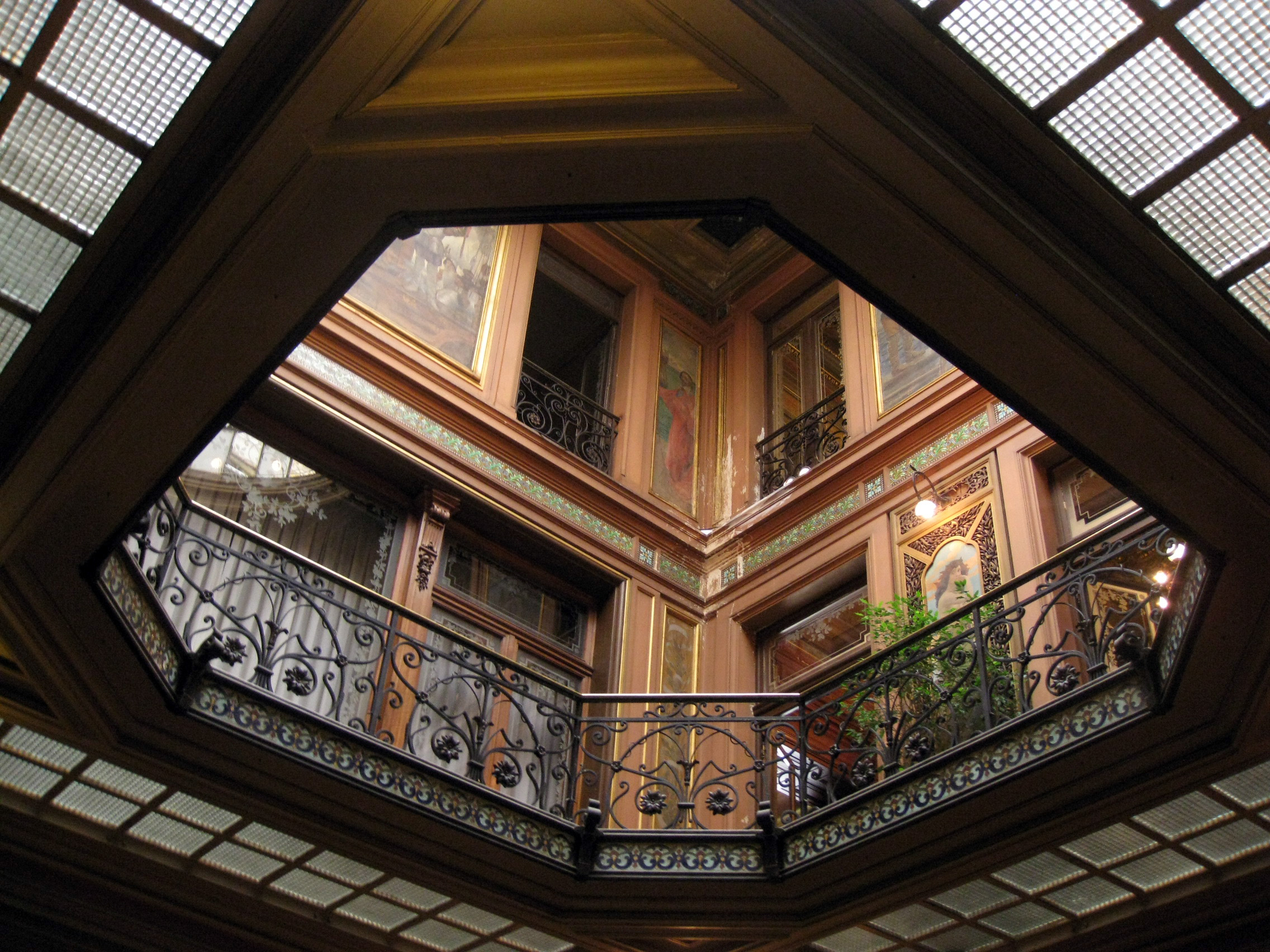
Gallery above the hall

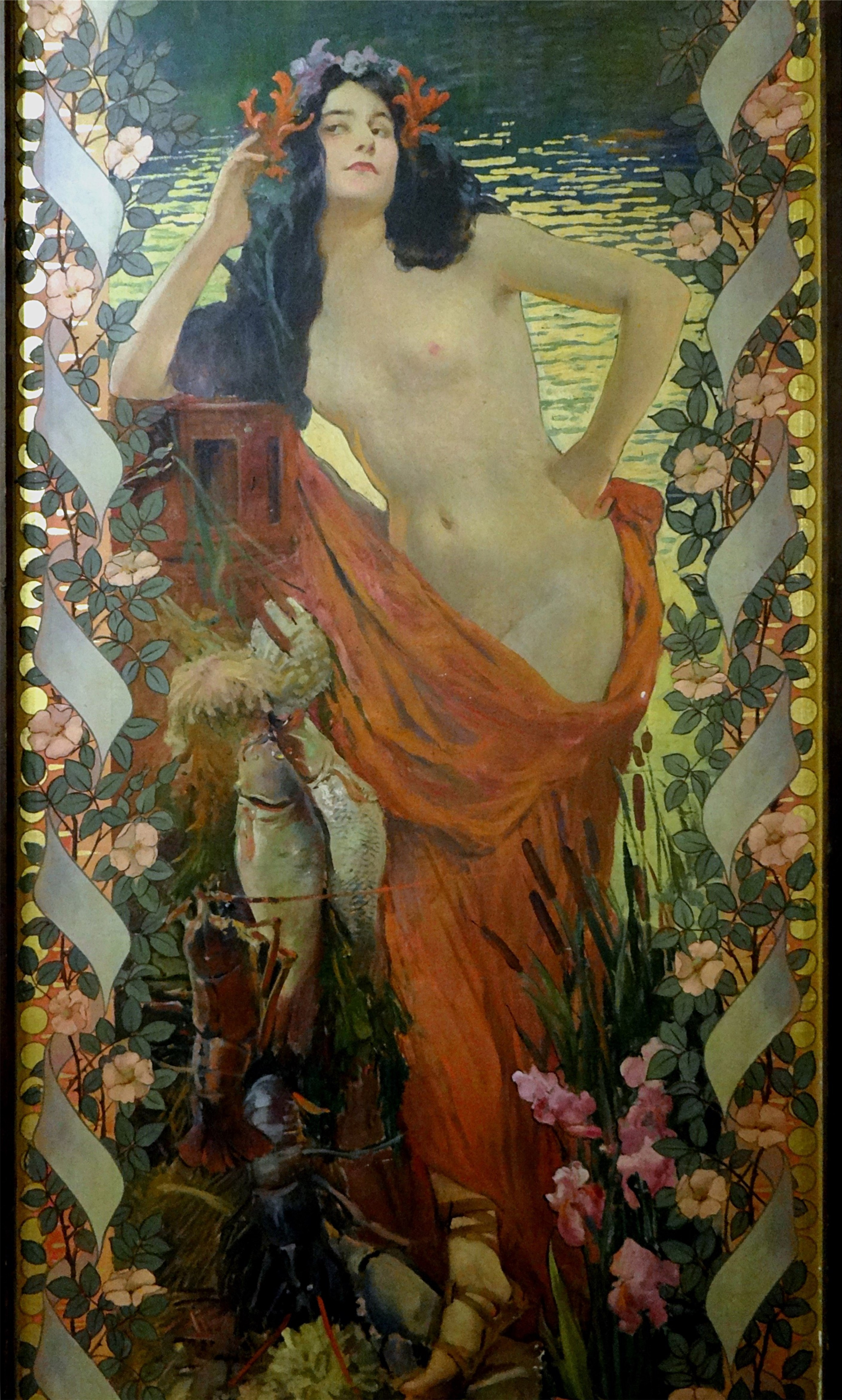
2nd floor mural

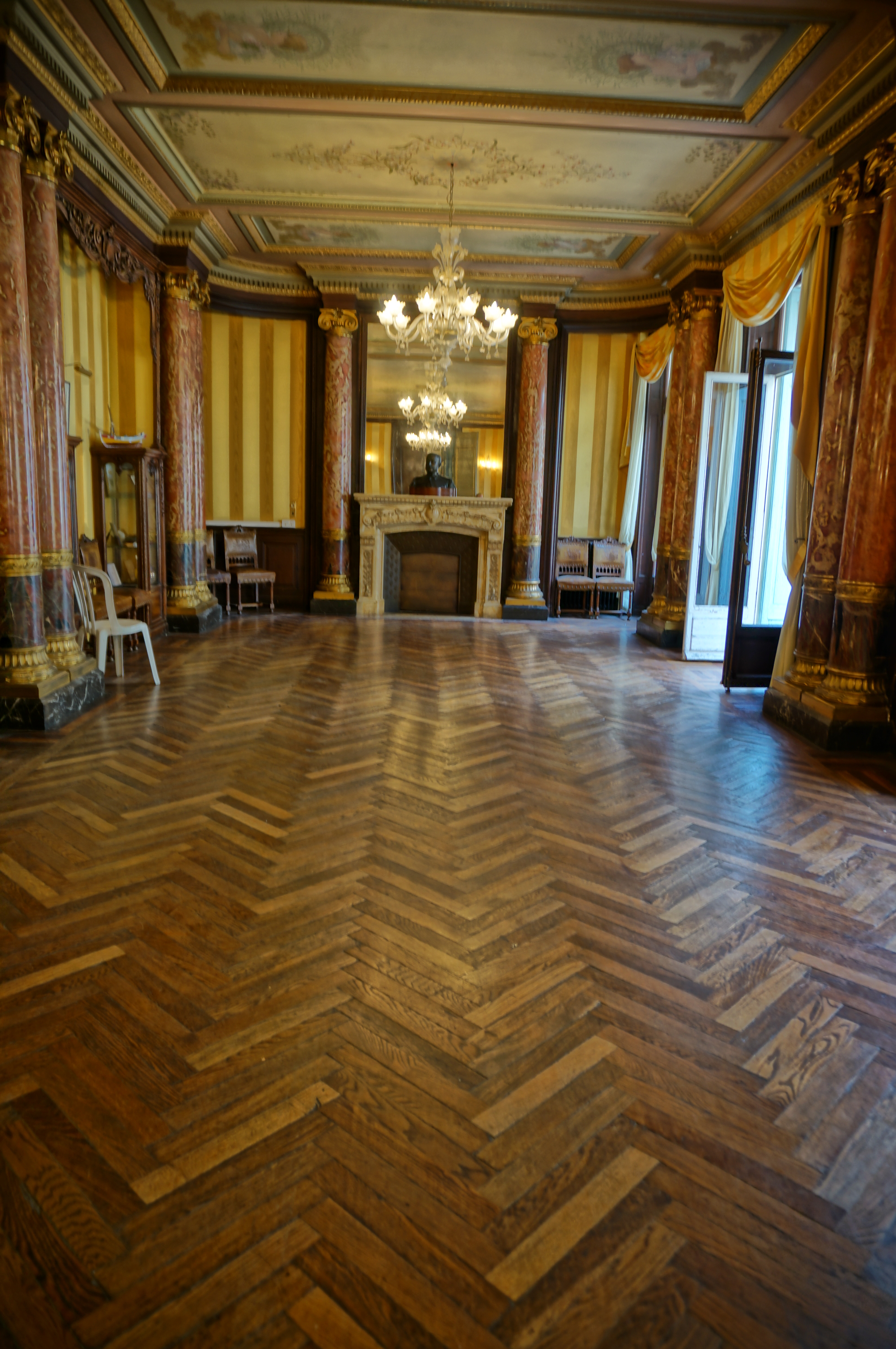
Salon

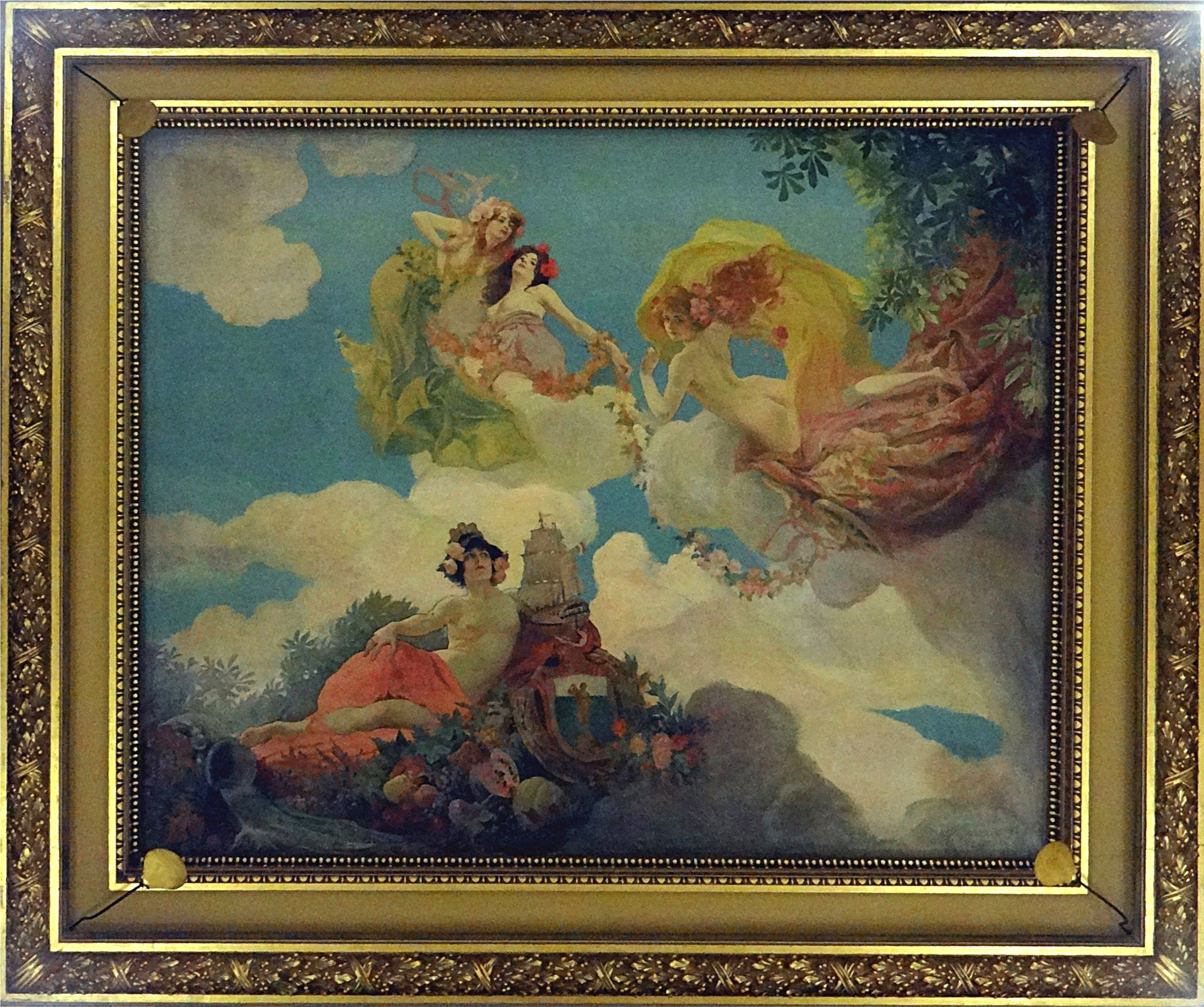
Allegory of Port-Vendres

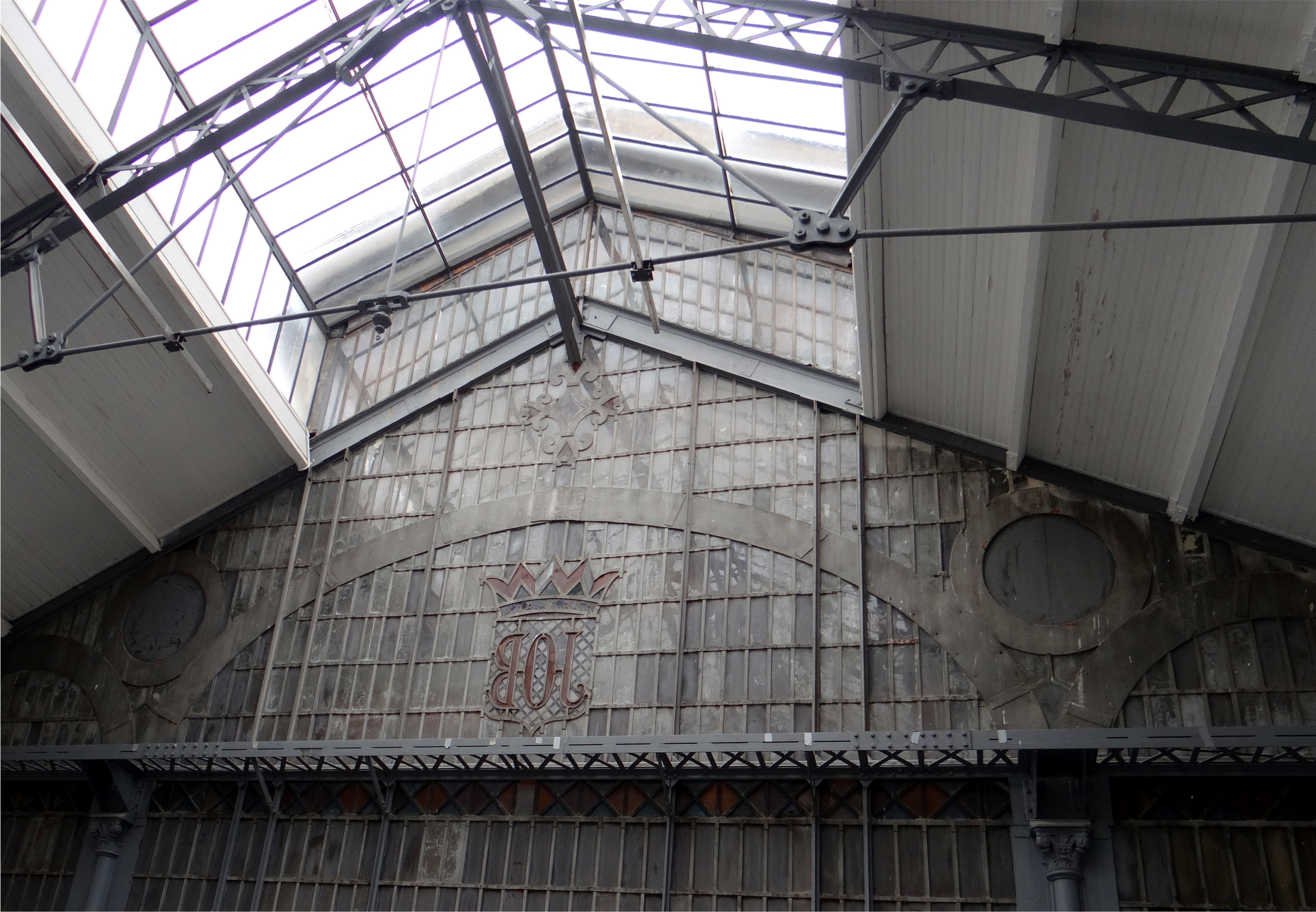
Skylight of the factory

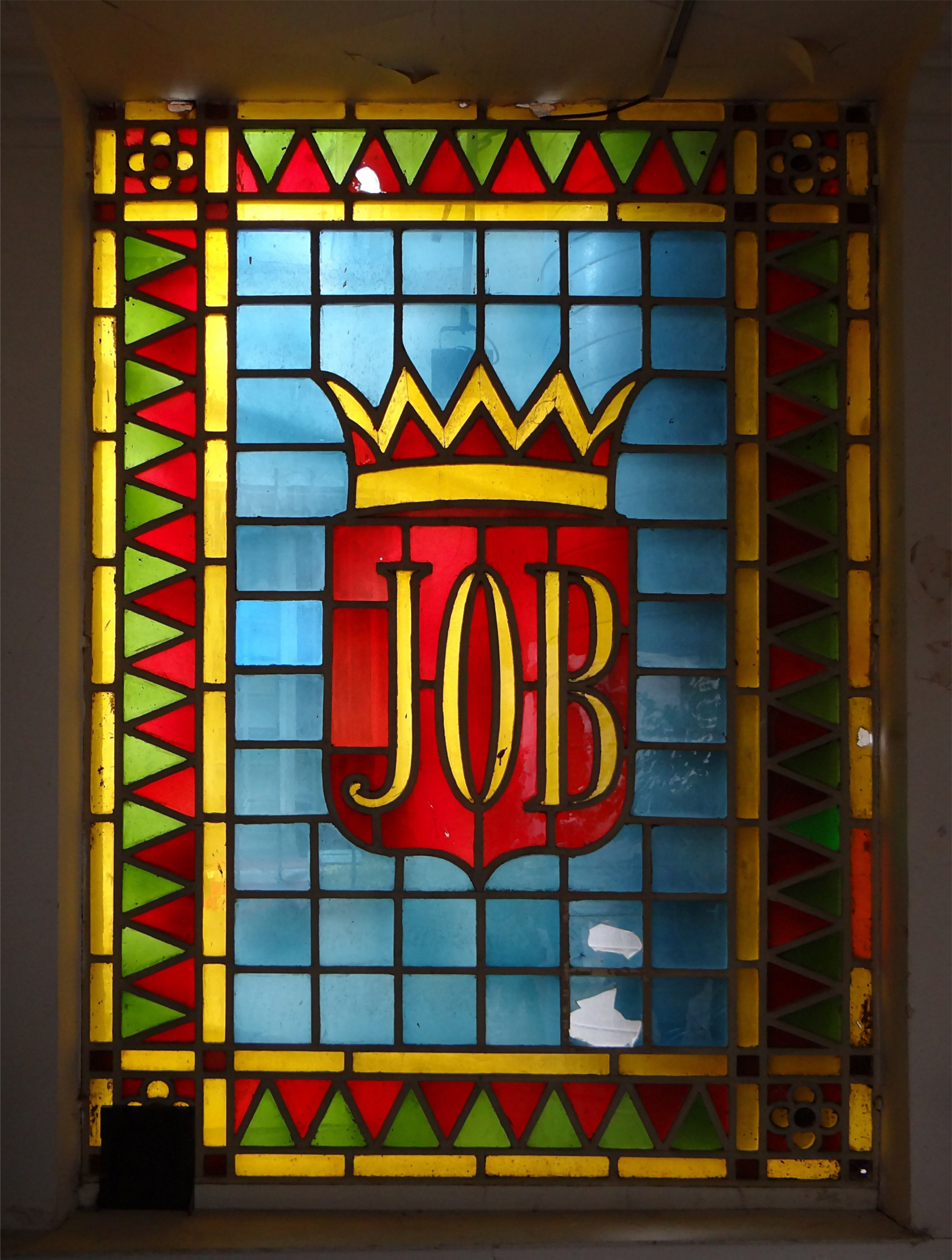
Stained glass JOB emblem

== Sources ==
- "Ancien Hôtel Pams", Mérimée (in French)
- Fiche Pédagogique - Hôtel Pams de Perpignan (PDF) (in French), Association Pédagogique de la Plaine, du Vallespir et de la Côte Vermeille
- Hôtel Pams (in French), Office de tourisme de la ville de Perpignan, archived from the original on 2016-11-18
- Hôtel Pams, Perpignan, visite (in French), viaFrance S.A.S
- Jules PAMS (in French), Cote Vermeille, archived from the original on 2016-01-07
- "Jules Pams", Les Pyrénées Catalanes (in French)
- L'hôtel Pams (in French), Mairie de Perpignan, archived from the original on 2016-04-09
- Muchir, Claire, Jules Pams (1852-1930) et le musée des Beaux-Arts de Perpignan (in French), Les Amis des Bardou
- Praca, Edwige, L’Hôtel Pams à Perpignan : " Cette maison-là était un musée " (in French), Les Amis des Bardou
