= Happy Refugees =

British post-punk band

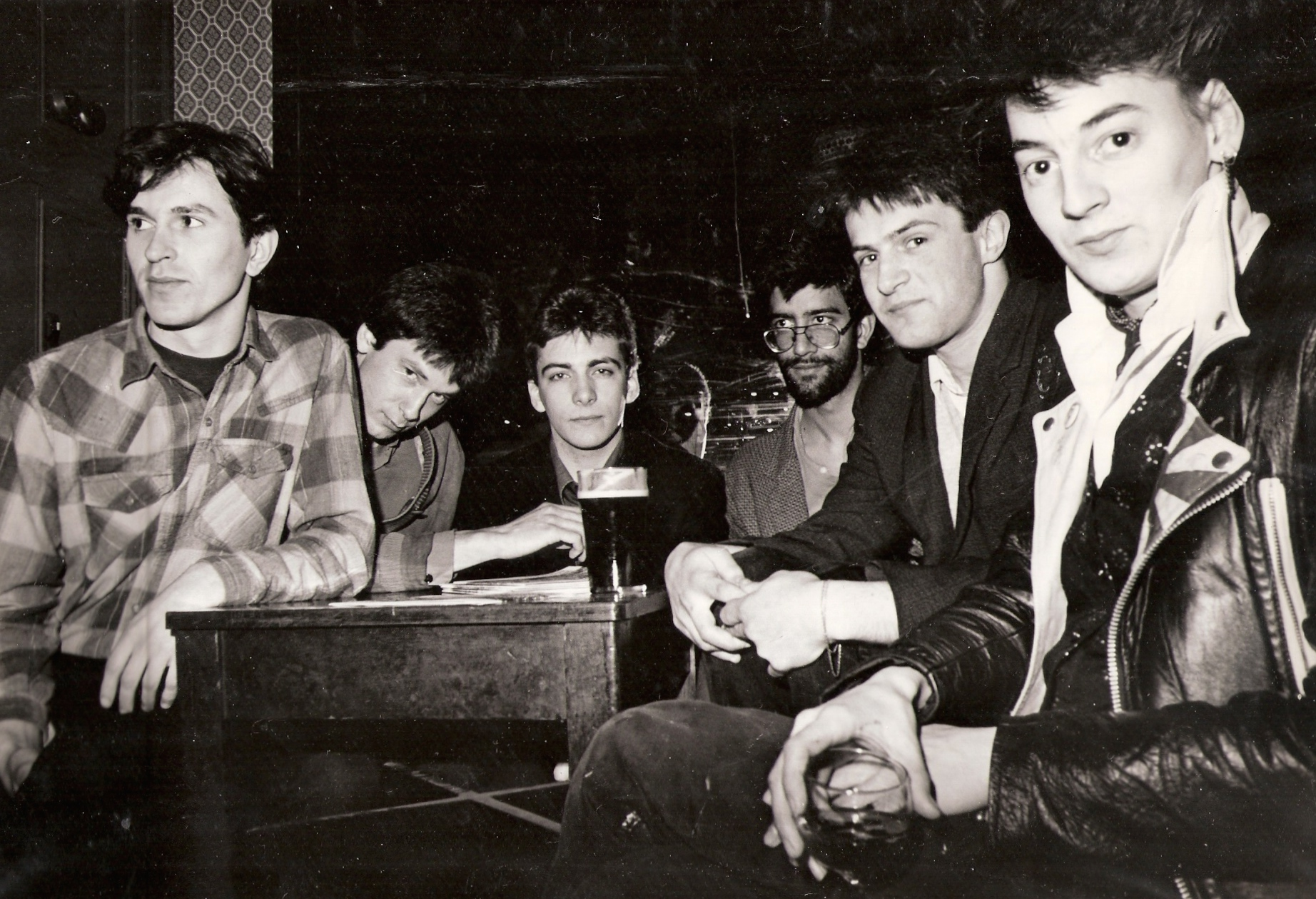
- The Happy Refugees lineup that released Last Chance Saloon, photographed in 1982. From left: Paul Johnston, Nick Flynn, Tim Shutt, Kevin Rodgers, Paul Lamb, Paul Harvey.

Background information
- Origin: London, England
- Genres: Post-punk, Lo-fi, DIY
- Years active: 1981–1986, 2010–present
- Labels: Gymnasium, Acute
- Members: Tim Shutt; Paul Johnston; Kevin Rodgers; Nick Flynn; Paul Harvey; Clive Williams
- Past members: Paul Lamb
- Website: www.happyrefugees.com

Happy Refugees are a British post-punk band from London, formed in 1981. The band are noted for their quirky mix of DIY garage rock, shambling post-punk, and delicate introspection. They are considered to be one of the last bands of the DIY era, and have been compared to The Fall, Swell Maps, and Captain Beefheart.

== History ==
=== 1981–1986: Formation and Last Chance Saloon ===
After leaving Stoke-based group The Pits in 1980, Tim Shutt moved to London. In February 1981, he decided to rerecord two of The Pits' songs: "Hamburger Boy", and "Switch". Phil Bourne and Dave Robbins from The Colors Out of Time played guitar and bass for the session, Shutt's then-housemate Kevin Rodgers filled in on drums, and an old bandmate of Shutt's, Paul Johnston, came along to help out. This recording was to be the beginning of Happy Refugees.

Shutt has since explained their choice of name: "I [liked] the idea of us all being refugees from something. 'Happy' was added to the band name. [Paul Johnston] was adamant that it should not have 'The' added. The name of the band was to be Happy Refugees."

The band was initially a four-piece, made up of Shutt, Johnston, and Rodgers, with a friend from college, Paul Lamb, playing bass. Their first formal release as a group was the double A-sided single Warehouse Sound / Enshrined in a Memory in 1982. It was released on their own imprint, Gymnasium Records, and distributed by Red Rhino, a member of the Cartel. This first single was met with acclaim, albeit underground. Nick Flynn and Paul Harvey joined later that year on keyboard and guitar, and the band began to write material for their first studio album, Last Chance Saloon, as well as playing in clubs around London. Last Chance Saloon was recorded in a single day in May 1983 to save money, and was released in early 1984.

Although the band split up weeks after recording the album, Shutt and Johnston carried on performing under the Happy Refugees moniker until 1986. Rodgers and Flynn formed their own band with their friend Clive Williams, called The Hotel Complex, while Harvey moved to Newcastle to join Pauline Murray's band, and was later to join the reformed Penetration in 2001.

=== 2010–present: Rerelease and Beyond Moth and Rust ===
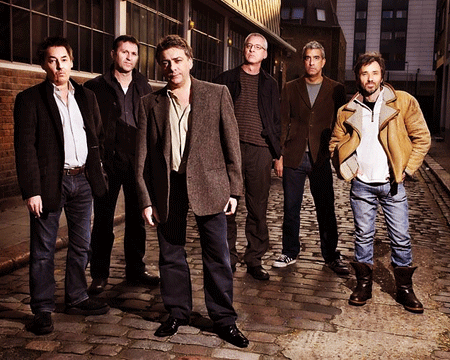
The Happy Refugees lineup that released Beyond Moth and Rust, photographed in 2011. From left: Paul Harvey, Paul Johnston, Tim Shutt, Nick Flynn, Kevin Rodgers, Clive Williams.

In 2010, after a two and a half decade hiatus from music, Shutt received a phone call from Dan Selzer, who wanted to rerelease Last Chance Saloon on New York-based Acute Records. Return to Last Chance Saloon was released in 2011, and included the band's 1982 single, as well as outtakes and demos not included on the original LP. It was made available both on vinyl and as a downloadable package, and was well received.

Happy Refugees reformed that same year, with Hotel Complex bassist Clive Williams replacing Lamb, who had died in 2007. The group visited New York to promote the record. While there, they recorded a live session on WFMU, as well as several other live performances, one as guests of American indie-rockers Crystal Stilts at The Knitting Factory, Brooklyn.

The band described themselves as inspired by the experience, and returned to the UK to write and record the songs for a second album, released on Gymnasium Records, with Harvey, by then a leading stuckist, providing the cover art. This album, titled Beyond Moth and Rust, was made available on iTunes and Spotify on 22 December 2014, and was officially released in vinyl format on 23 February 2015. It includes several songs the band had written in the eighties, but never recorded, such as "What's Your Appeal", and "Ill Wind", as well as various newly penned tracks.

== Influence ==
Crystal Stilts and Irish four-piece Girls Names have named the band as an influence. In 2012, NME featured Last Chance Saloon as one of 100 Great Albums You've Never Heard at the behest of Dylan Baldi of Cloud Nothings, and in 2014, "Hamburger Boy", a song from Last Chance Saloon, was named in The story of UK DIY: 131 experimental underground classics from 1977-1985 by FACT Magazine. Additionally, the cover of their first single Warehouse Sound / Enshrined in a Memory, featuring a photocopied picture of a bush, was shown in a 2012 exhibition of great punk graphics at the Hayward Gallery, London.

== Members ==
- Tim Shutt - lead vocals (1981–1986, 2010–present)
- Paul Johnston - guitar (1981–1986, 2010–present)
- Paul Lamb - bass guitar (1981–1983)
- Kevin Rodgers - drums (1981–1983, 2010–present)
- Nick Flynn - keyboard (1982–1983, 2010–present)
- Paul Harvey - guitar (1982–1983, 2010–present)
- Clive Williams - bass guitar (2010–present)

== Discography ==
- Warehouse Sound / Enshrined in a Memory (Double-single) (1982, Gymnasium)
- Last Chance Saloon (1984, Gymnasium)
- Return to Last Chance Saloon (2011, Acute)
- Beyond Moth and Rust (2015, Gymnasium)
