= L'Eau à la bouche =

- Directed by: Jacques Doniol-Valcroze
- Written by: Jean-José Richer; Jacques Doniol-Valcroze
- Produced by: Pierre Braunberger
- Starring: Françoise Brion; Bernadette Lafont; Alexandra Stewart
- Cinematography: Roger Fellous
- Edited by: Nadine Trintignant
- Music by: Serge Gainsbourg
- Release date: 1960
- Running time: 95 minutes
- Country: France
- Language: French

L'Eau à la bouche is a 1960 French film directed by Jacques Doniol-Valcroze and starring Françoise Brion, Bernadette Lafont and Alexandra Stewart.

== Plot ==
Miléna is living in her grandmother's château when the rich lady dies. Her lawyer Miguel insists that the woman's two other grandchildren, Fifine and her brother Jean-Paul, be at the château for the reading of the will, even though they have been estranged from the family from an early age. When Fifine eventually arrives at the château, it is not long before she falls for Miguel.

In the meantime, Fifine's boyfriend Robert shows up in the guise of her brother Jean-Paul, and finds himself very attracted to his girlfriend's cousin Miléna. So, while Fifine goes after the lawyer, Robert is occupied with his own pursuits. The maid, Prudence, in turn, is undecided about whether to accept the lecherous overtures of the butler César, who has just hired her.

== Cast ==
- Françoise Brion as Miléna Brett-Juval
- Bernadette Lafont as Prudence
- Alexandra Stewart as Séraphine Brett-Juval, aka Fifine
- Michel Galabru as César
- Jacques Riberolles as Robert Godard
- Gérard Barray as Miguel Baran
- Paul Guers as Jean-Paul Brett-Juval
- Florence Loinod as Florence

== Production ==
Filming took place at the Château d'Aubiry in Céret.

== Censorship ==
When L'Eau à la bouche was first released in Italy in 1959, the Committee for the Theatrical Review of the Italian Ministry of Cultural Heritage and Activities rated the film suitable for people 16 years and older. In order for the film to be screened publicly, the committee recommended that the scene in which the maid and waiter are chasing each other should be cut at the moment when the maid's skirt is ripped. The Committee also requested the removal of the scene in which Milena is undressing in her room. The reason for the age restriction, cited in the official documents, is because the subject of the movie was considered to be inappropriate to the sensitivity of a minor. The official document number is 32778, signed on 2 September 1960 by Minister Renzo Helfer.
