= Viggo Dorph-Petersen =

Danish architect

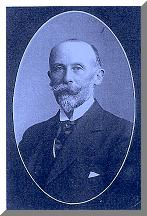
- Born: 9 February 1851; Copenhagen, Denmark
- Died: 23 July 1937 (aged 86); Perpignan, France
- Occupation: Architect
- Known for: Designing French chateaus

Viggo Dorph-Petersen (9 February 1851 in Copenhagen – 23 July 1937 in Perpignan, France) was a Danish architect He is best known for designing French chateaus including Château d'Aubiry.

== Selected works ==
- Château de Valmy (1888)
- Château d'Aubiry (1893)

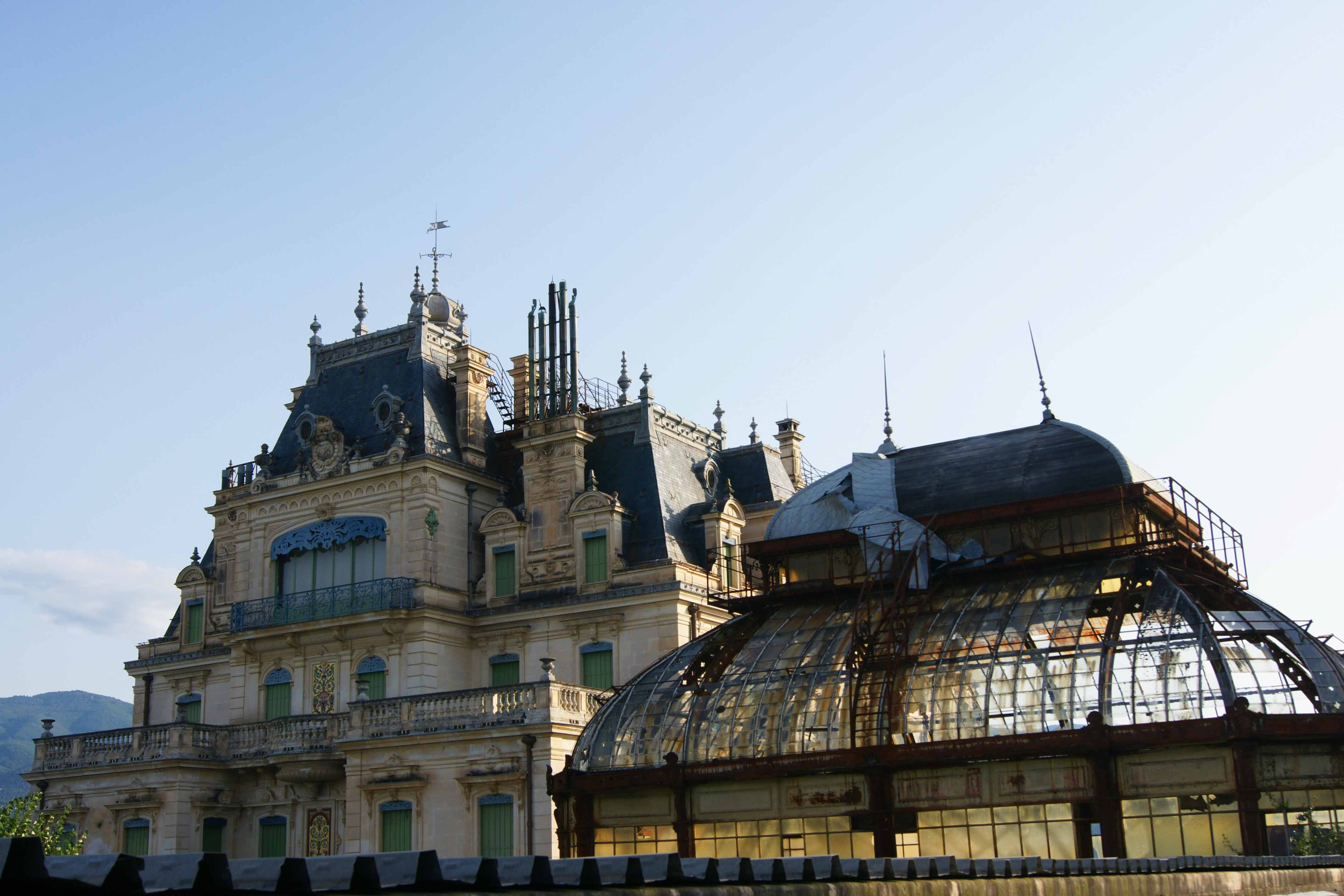
Château d'Aubiry in 2011
