= Paul Harvey (artist) =

English musician and artist

Dr. Paul Harvey
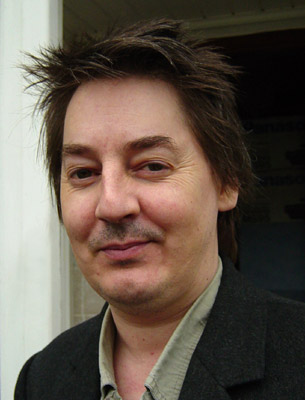
- Born: 7 May 1960 (age 66); Burton upon Trent, Staffordshire, England, United Kingdom
- Education: North Staffordshire Polytechnic
- Known for: Painting
- Notable work: The Stuckists Punk Victorian, Charles Saatchi, Madonna
- Movement: Stuckism

Paul Arthur Harvey (born 7 May 1960) is a British musician and Stuckist artist, whose work was used to promote the Stuckists' 2004 show at the Liverpool Biennial. His paintings draw on pop art and the work of Alphonse Mucha, and often depict celebrities, including Madonna.

== Life and career ==
Paul Harvey was born in Burton upon Trent, Staffordshire. He attended Burton Grammar School (1971–1978) and North Staffordshire Polytechnic (1978–1982) for Foundation Art and BA (Hons) Design. In 1982, he moved to London and played in post-punk bands including Happy Refugees; in 1986 he moved to Newcastle to join Pauline Murray's band. During this time, he co-published-and-drew Mauretania Comics with comics artist Chris Reynolds, and also taught graffiti art.

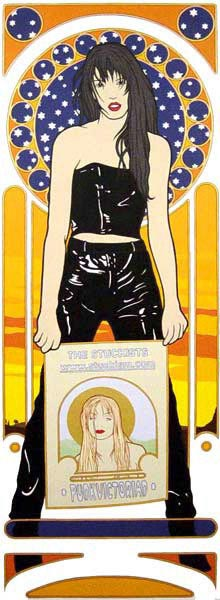
Paul Harvey's painting on the cover of the book The Stuckists Punk Victorian

In 2001, he became a full-time lecturer in graphic design at North Tyneside College (now Tyne Metropolitan College, within The Creative Studios department). The same year, he joined the Stuckism art group, founding a Newcastle branch. In 2002, he joined Murray's re-formed punk band Penetration; he curated the show, Stuck in Newcastle, at the Newcastle Arts Centre, and was a joint winner of the Stuckists Real Turner Prize Show 2002.

He showed with the group at the Wednesbury Museum in 2003. 2003–2005, he gained an MA in Fine Art Practice at the University of Northumbria. In 2004, he was the Stuckist co-curator with Hiroko Oshima of the Ryu Art Group of the show, Members Only: the Artist Group in Japan and Britain, which took place at the Bailiffgate Museum, Alnwick.

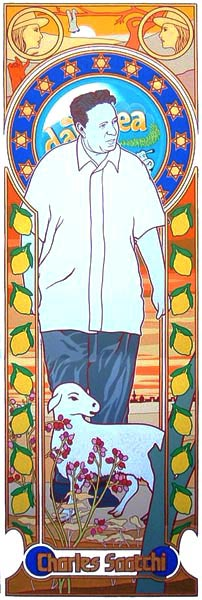
Paul Harvey. Charles Saatchi.

He was a featured artist in The Stuckists Punk Victorian show at the Walker Art Gallery for the 2004 Liverpool Biennial. His painting of artist and model Emily Mann was used to promote the show. The painting was based on a photograph of Mann by Charles Thomson and was originally intended to promote the Stuckists Real Turner Prize Show 2003: at that time the placard contained the text, "Serota needs a good spanking".

However, according to Harvey, another artist Gina Bold "got really angry and started a debate about the S&M/fetish allusion. She got really pissed off with me because I didn’t agree with her. Then it got a bit nasty—the whole thing was just daft. Then the show got cancelled—and it had all been a complete waste of my fucking time." He later repainted the placard with a woman's face, and it was used in this form for the Walker show.

In 2006, he was one of the ten "leading Stuckists" in the Go West exhibition at Spectrum London gallery. In 2007, he was in the show, I Won't Have Sex with You as Long as We're Married, at the A Gallery.

In 2008, he was commissioned by Job cigarette papers to create a set of campaign posters with a stylistic reference to Alphonse Mucha, who had created earlier paintings for the firm. Harvey made works featuring famous double acts to emphasise the sales message of "The Original Double", a reference to the twin-size packets of papers made by Job. Harvey's enthusiasm for the project came about because "Mucha is one of his heroes", said Mark Ross, the director of Glorious Creative agency managing the campaign. The work created some controversy: Gilbert and George gave their endorsement to the images, but The Mighty Boosh and The White Stripes were not pleased to be featured. Famous Doubles, a show of the original paintings used for the posters, was promoted at the Wanted Gallery in Notting Hill by Fraser Kee Scott, director of the A Gallery.

In 2009, his painting of Charles Saatchi was banned from the window display of the Artspace Gallery in Maddox Street, London, on the grounds that it was "too controversial for the area". It was the centrepiece of the show, Stuckist Clowns Doing Their Dirty Work, the first exhibition of the Stuckists in Mayfair, and showed Saatchi with a sheep at his feet and a halo made from a cheese wrapper. The Saatchi Gallery said that Saatchi "would not have any problem" with the painting's display. The gallery announced they were shutting down the show. Harvey said:

I did it to make Saatchi look friendly and human. It's a ludicrous decision because it's not even a controversial painting. It's just Dairylea cheese and a sheep and some lemons, because he likes lemonade.

The Stuckists considered legal action, and co-ordinated, on the event's Facebook page, a campaign of emails to the gallery, which agreed to exhibit the painting in the window and to continue the show.

In October 2011, Harvey was awarded a PhD on Stuckism at Northumbria University.

As of 2020, Harvey teaches Art & Design at Queen Alexandra Sixth Form College in North Shields.

== Paintings ==
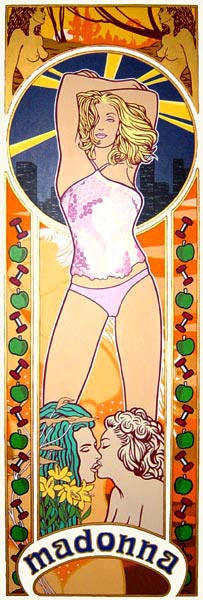
Madonna, by Paul Harvey, 2002.

His images are often derived from pictures of film and singing "stars" in magazines, and reworked into a new context. His style references pop art and Alfons Mucha. The incorporation of modern symbols poses an ambiguity as to the amount of irony present, though the artist has claimed that he does not intend this. Possibly his best-known work is a painting of the singer Madonna. The elements mentioned are clearly visible, with small dumbbells around the border, for example Madonna, contrasting with Art Nouveau curves and languidity.

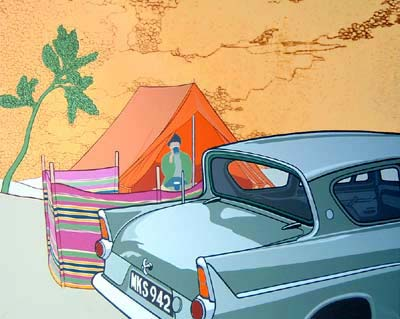
Ford Anglia with Tent and Giotto Tree

He has described his work as strong line defining flat areas of colour, "dealing with ideas of beauty and decoration" and often appropriating images from art history and popular culture.

He describes his methodology: "I use photographs but change the composition on a computer. I project onto canvas, trace the masses with a blue pencil, paint the details freehand with a sable brush, and the larger areas two to four times (for opacity) with Japanese or decorator’s brushes. I often change figures to get it right. I paint incessantly at home—paintings take up to three months."

== Gallery ==
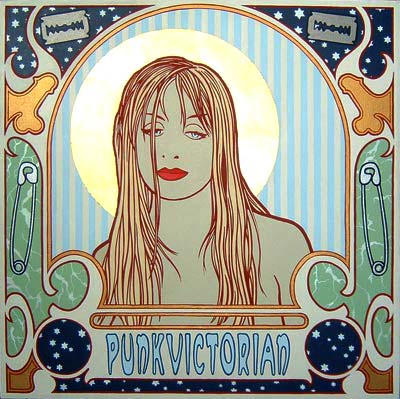
Punk Victorian

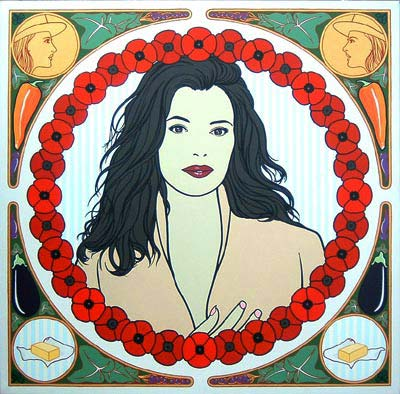
Nigella Lawson

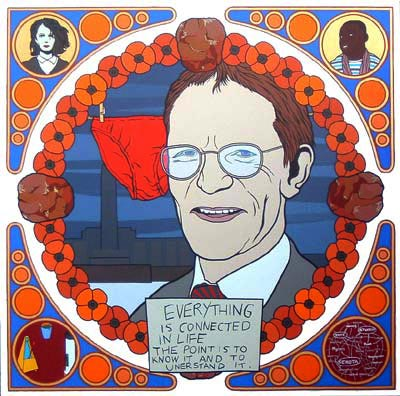
Sir Nicholas Serota

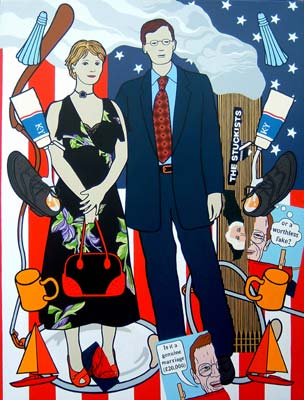
I Won't Have Sex with You as long as We're Married

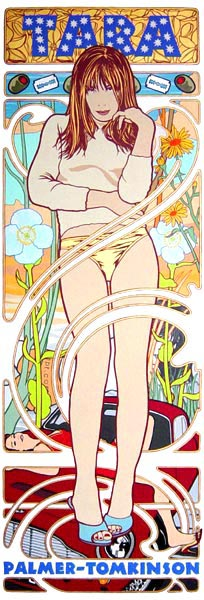
Tara Palmer-Tomkinson

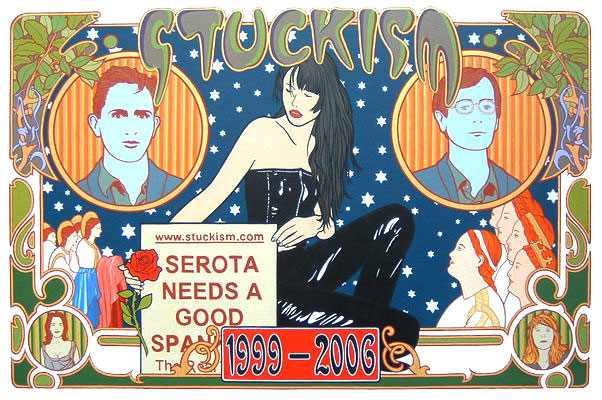
Stuckism 1999–2006

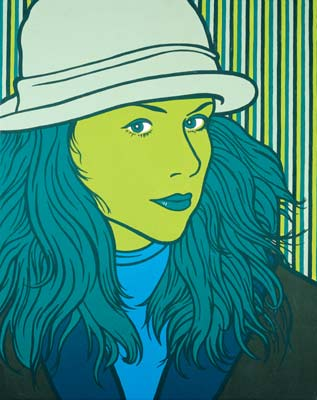
Kino VIII

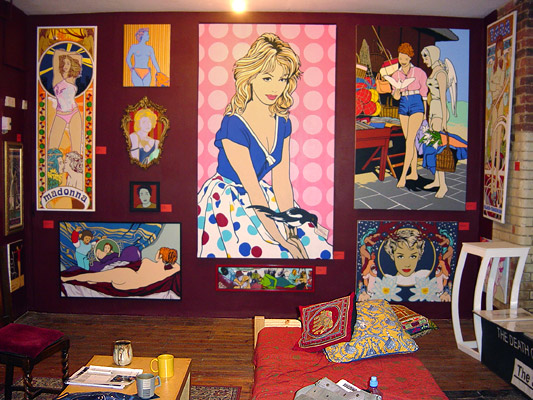
Paintings at The Stuckists Summer Show, Stuckism International Gallery, 2003

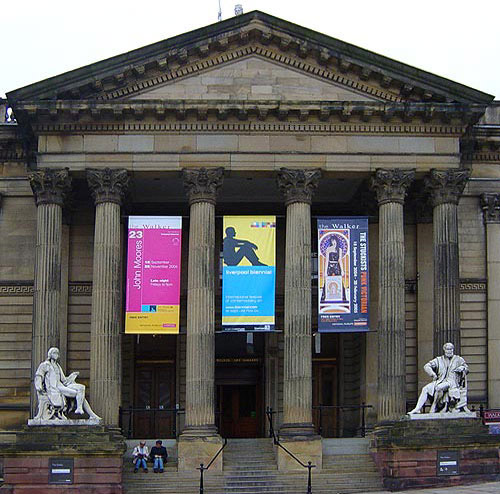
Banner outside the Walker Art Gallery, 2004

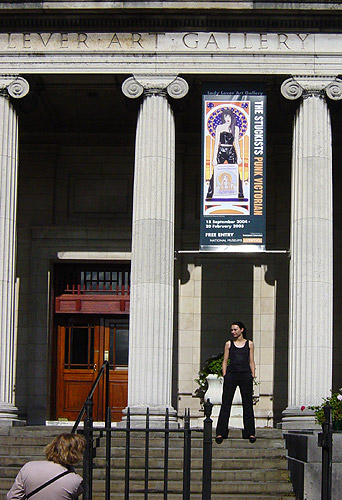
Banner outside the Lady Lever Art Gallery, 2004

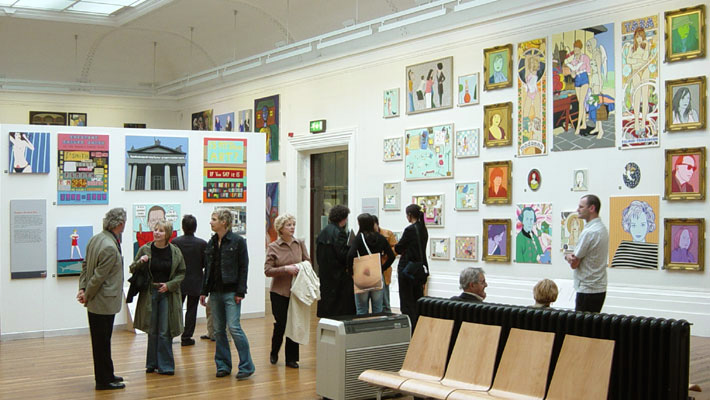
Paintings (first section on the right) at The Stuckists Punk Victorian, 2004
