= Château d'Aubiry =

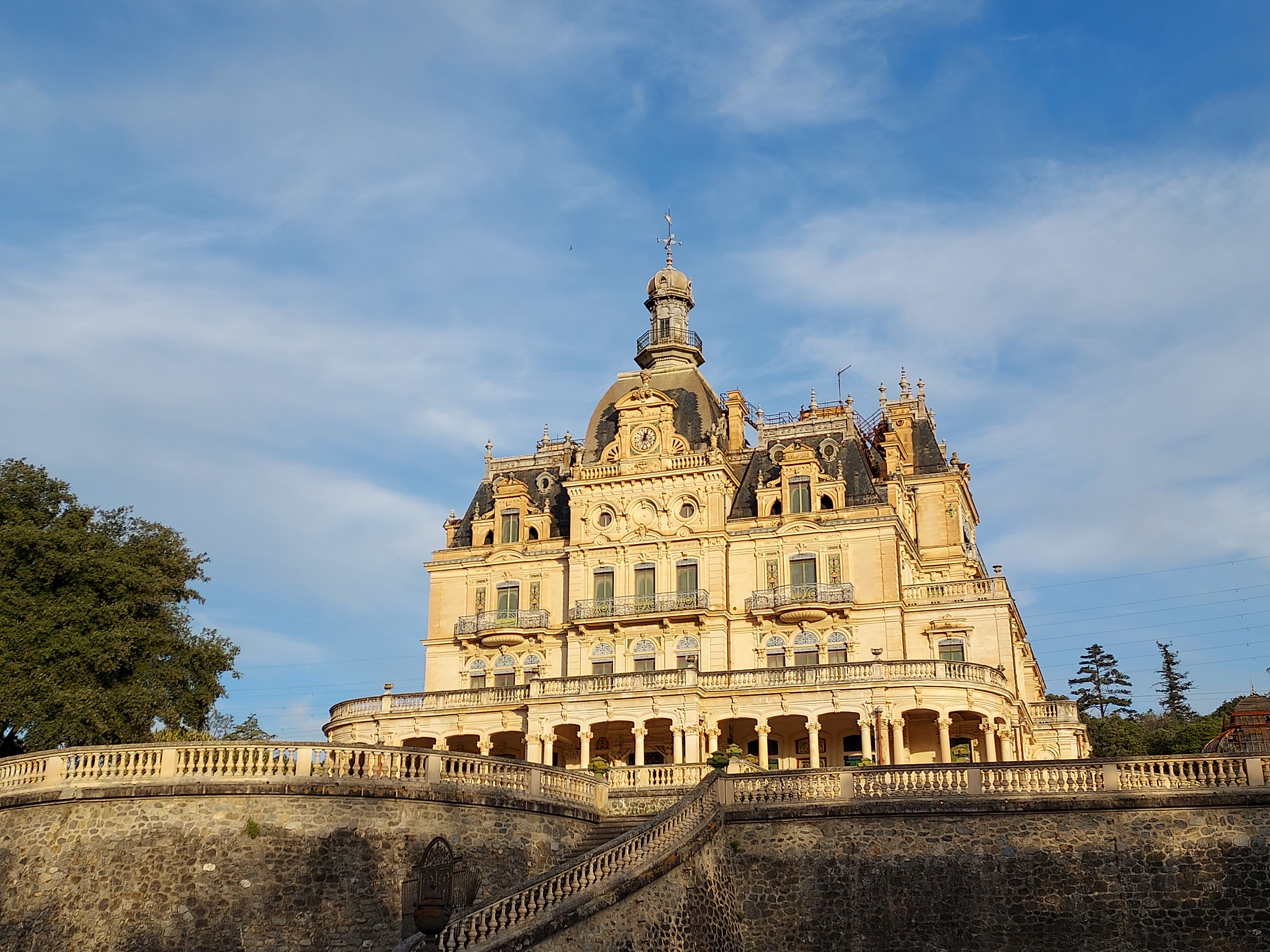
- The Château d'Aubiry

- Location within France

General information
- Type: Château
- Architectural style: Art Nouveau
- Location: Céret, Pyrénées-Orientales (France)
- Coordinates: 42°30′46.5″N 2°45′58″E
- Current tenants: Private
- Construction started: 1893
- Completed: 1904

Technical details
- Floor area: 2,500 m^{2} (27,000 sq ft)

Design and construction
- Architect: Viggo Dorph-Petersen

The Château d'Aubiry is a château located in Céret (Pyrénées-Orientales), built between 1893 and 1904. Designed by the Danish architect Viggo Dorph-Petersen, the Château d'Aubiry was built for the son of French industrialist Pierre Bardou-Job. It was used as a filming location in 1960 for the movie L'Eau à la bouche, and has been protected as an official French historical monument since 2006.

== Location ==
Although located in Céret, the Château d'Aubiry is nearer to the city limits of Saint-Jean-Pla-de-Corts than the town of Céret itself and can be seen from the road D 115, on the right side when coming from Saint-Jean-Pla-de-Corts and going towards Céret.

== History ==
French industrialist Pierre Bardou-Job became wealthy selling rolling paper and decided to have a château built for each of his three children, all designed by the Danish architect Viggo Dorph-Petersen. The Château d'Aubiry was for his son Justin and was built from 1893 to 1904. Pierre Bardou-Job himself never saw it, as he died suddenly in 1892 just before the start of the construction.

The Château d'Aubiry was used as a filming location in 1960 for the movie L'Eau à la bouche by French director Jacques Doniol-Valcroze. It has been protected as an official French historical monument since 2006, and was offered for sale in 2011 with an asking price of 21 million Euros.
