= Pierre Bardou-Job =

French businessman

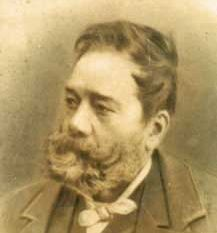
- Born: Pierre Bardou; 17 August 1826; Ille-sur-Têt, Pyrénées-Orientales, France
- Died: 24 February 1892 (aged 65); Perpignan, Pyrénées-Orientales, France
- Occupation: Industrialist
- Known for: JOB cigarette paper

Pierre Bardou-Job (17 August 1826 – 24 February 1892) was a French industrialist, manufacturer of JOB cigarette papers, and art collector.

== Background ==
The use of cigarettes, where tobacco is rolled in thin paper, was imported to France from Spain by French soldiers of the army of occupation, particularly after the 1823 expedition of the Hundred Thousand Sons of Saint Louis. Cigarette paper factories were built in the Pyrenees region, including Perpignan. Jean Bardou (1799–1852) was originally a baker, and later became a painter and draftsman. His eldest son Joseph (1823–84) learned the art of making cigarette papers from a manufacturer in La Seu d'Urgell. Jean Bardou decided to enter the business, and in 1849 was documented as a "fancy paper manufacturer". On 3 September 1849 he received a 15-year patent for manufacture of Job cigarette papers. The JOB brand was formed by the founder's initials separated by a diamond representing Perpignan, J♦B. This at once began to be spoken as "JOB".

The small operation was based on the upper floors of a house rented by Jean Bardou on the rue du Bastion St Dominique, at first using paper from another manufacturer. Bardou's children Pierre (1826–92), Marie (1821–98) and Magdeleine Bardou (1829–1907) and four other workers undertook paper cutting and packaging into booklets using paper manufactured in Castres. The packages of rolling paper gave a time-saving alternative to the smoker who would otherwise cut his own paper from a sheet, and were advertised as being hygienic and healthful.

== Manufacturer ==
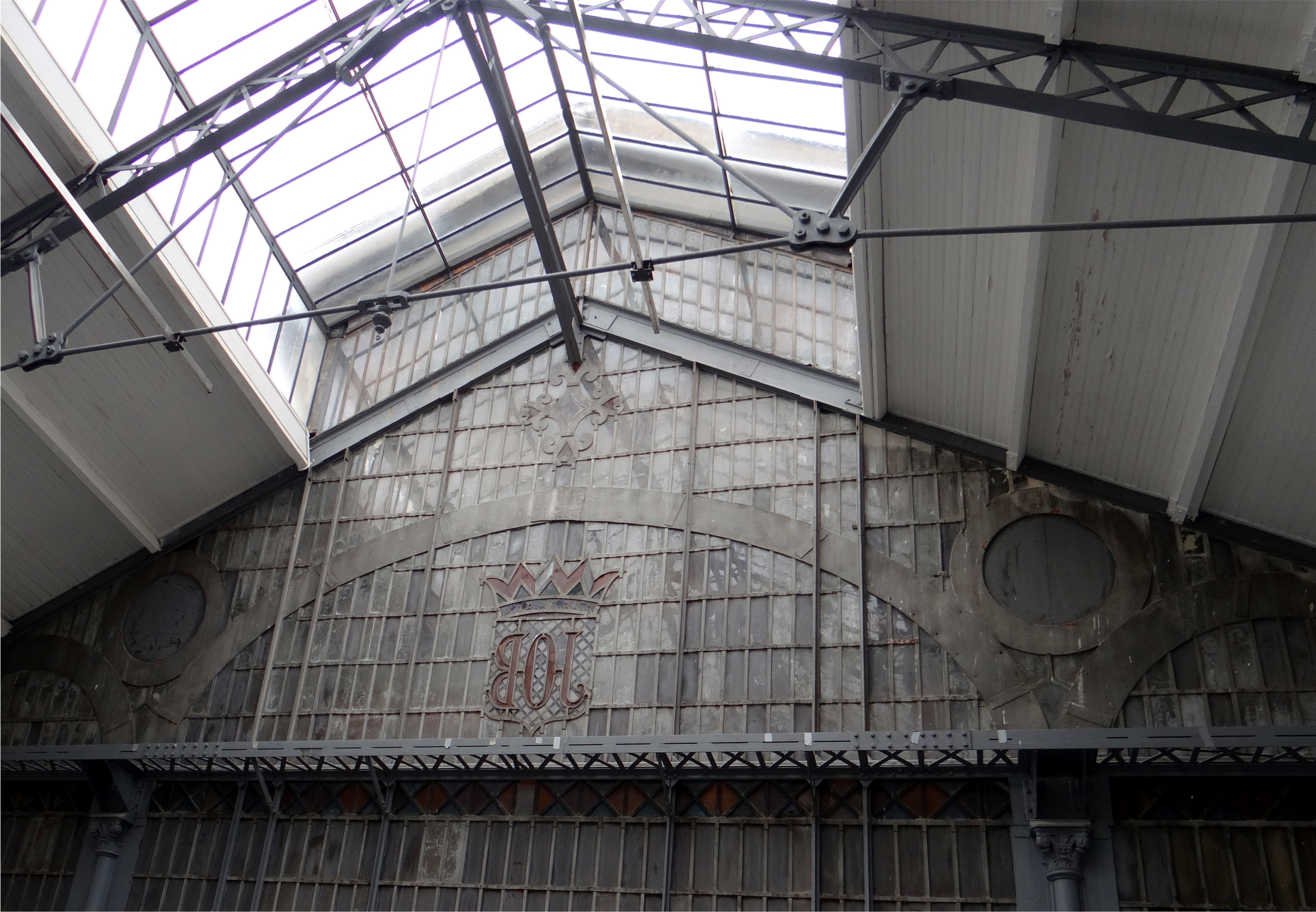
Skylight of the "Hôtel de l’Industrie du Papier a Cigarette

Jean Bardou died in 1852. The JOB brand was auctioned in August 1853 and bought for 16,000 francs by Pierre Bardou. His brother Joseph Bardou had formed a separate company making "le Nil" cigarette papers, with a laughing elephant as its logo. In January 1854 Pierre began making his own paper in Perpignan. A range of flavored papers included licorice, anise, vanilla, juniper, camphor and so on. Careful attention to marketing included development of premium or luxury papers, with attractive boxes designed for ladies.

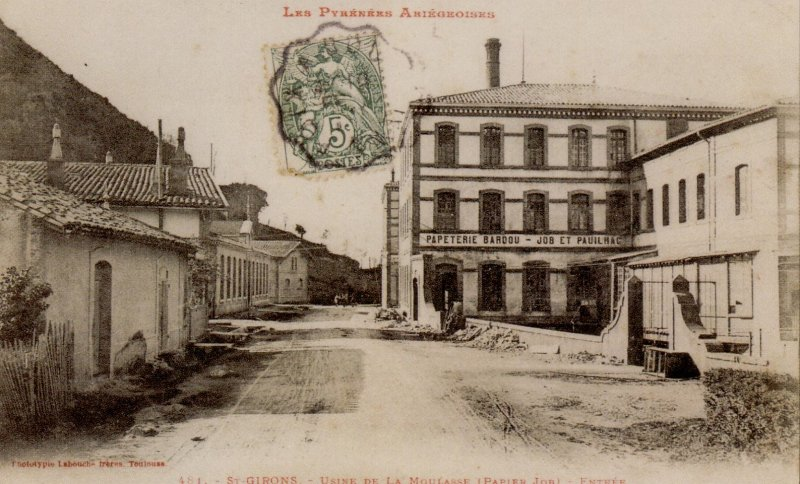
Moulasse paper plant

At the end of 1858 Bardou bought a large house at 18 rue St Sauveur in Perpignan (now the Rue Zola) for 40,000 francs, originally an apartment building, which he divided into one area for manufacturing and another for his residence. Pierre had a glass skylight installed in his "Hôtel de l’Industrie du Papier a Cigarette" factory for illumination. It was used for manufacture from 1861 to 1879, and employed 80 workers in 1861. In 1865–66 a workshop was installed for lithography and printing. Around 1872–75 the Moulasse paper plant was opened on the Salat, a tributary of the Ariège, registered under the names of Pierre Bardou and Leon Pauilhac. A second building was acquired at 13 St Sauveur, then additional buildings until an entire block was occupied, with the manufacturing process becoming increasingly automated, driven by steam power. By 1889 the Job company employed 290 women and 40 men.

Pierre and his brother Joseph both employed excellent graphic artists, including Jane Atché of Toulouse and the Czech Alphonse Mucha, to create advertising material.

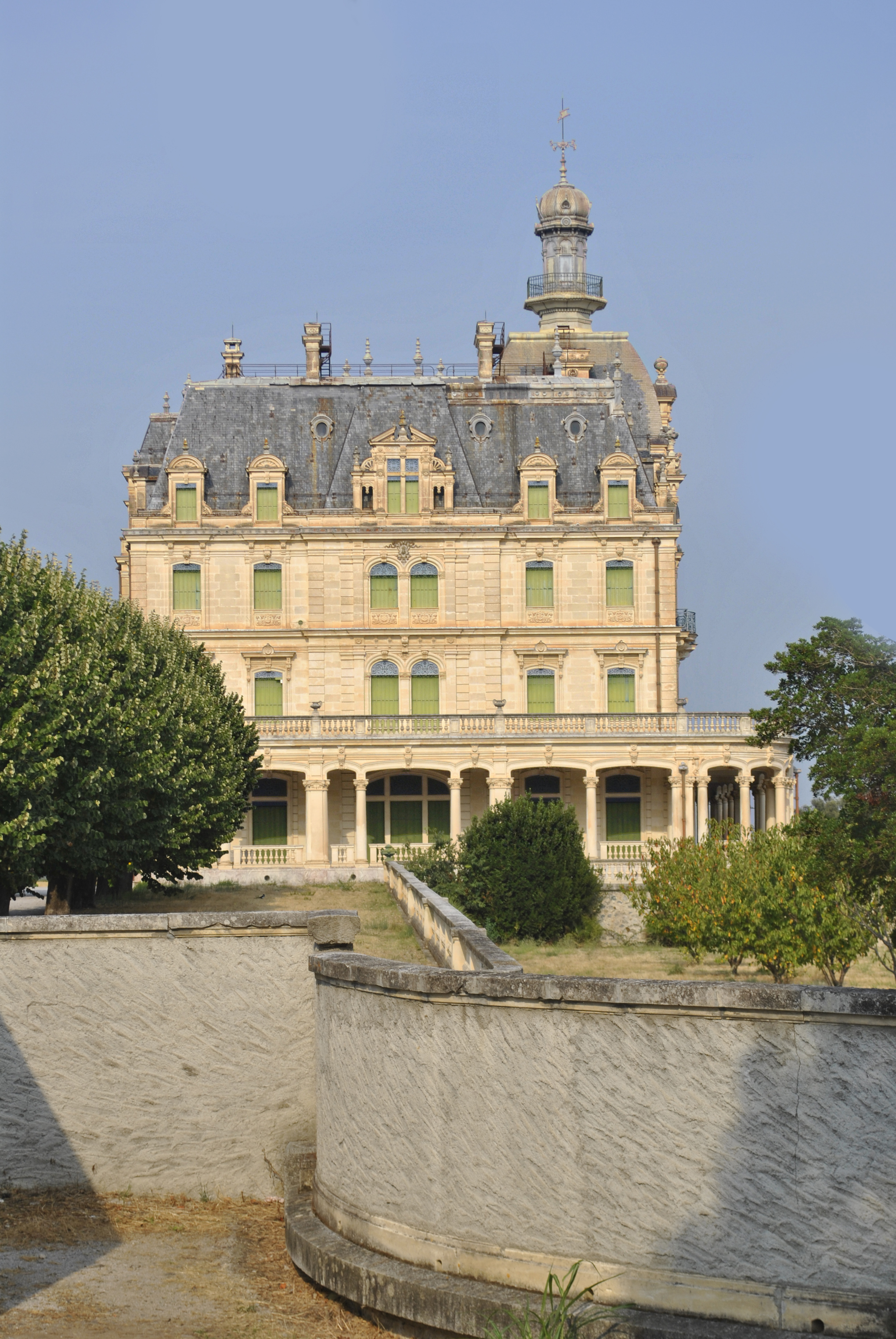
Château d'Aubiry. built for Justin Bardou

== Wealthy bourgeois ==
In 1857 Pierre Bardou married Léonie Amiel, daughter of a Perpignan confectioner, who brought no dowry. He bestowed 12,000 francs on her in case of his death. By the early 1860s Bardou had transformed his house on the rue Saint-Sauveur into a mansion with luxury furniture and valuable artworks. He owned a growing number of properties in the town and the countryside. Pierre's wife, Léonie Amiel, died in 1871 leaving three children. His sister-in-law, Henriette Amiel, moved into the mansion on 18 rue Saint-Sauveur in Perpignan to care for them.

Pierre Bardou was an avid collector of exotic and unusual objects. An 1871 inventory of the mansion at 18 rue St Sauveur listed 669 items of furniture and decoration. The private area had twelve main rooms arranged around a courtyard above which was a gallery, There were two dining rooms on the ground floor, two libraries and a chapel upstairs. The house held an eclectic collection of paintings, statues, bronzes, ivories, enamels and weapons. In 1877 Pierre's private assets were valued at an estimated 413,300 francs.

In 1878 by presidential decree Bardou changed his name to Bardou-Job, an unusual example of the creator adopting the name of the brand rather than the reverse. His eldest daughter, Camille (1858–1934), married Charles Ducup de Saint-Paul, a senior officer. His son, Justin (1860–1930), married the daughter of a business lawyer. In 1888 Jules Pams married his youngest daughter Jeanne (1868–1918). Pams was an attorney and municipal councilor in Perpignan with a family fortune earned from maritime trade. While Pierre Bardou was an enthusiastic collector of "curiosities", Jules Pams was an enlightened amateur and patron of contemporary art, and in effect became Bardou's artistic adviser. Jeanne and Jules Pams moved into the Hôtel de l'Industrie, which became known as the Hôtel Pams, and no longer included manufacturing. Pierre continued to live in the mansion.

In 1889 Pierre brought back to Perpignan part of the "Chinese pavilion" from the Exposition Universelle of that year. It was reassembled on the Promenade des Platanes for the 1890 Perpignan Industrial Exhibition. He provided more than 400 items for the exhibition's Fine Arts pavilion, including liturgical furniture, antique weapons, Egyptian and Roman antiquities, Louis XV and Louis XVI furniture, paintings and sculptures. Bardou commissioned the Danish architect Viggo Theodor Dorph-Petersen to design a chateau for each of his children. These buildings were completed after his death. Justin was given the Château d'Aubiry (1894–1900) in Céret, Camille was given the Château Ducup St Paul (1892–1910) in Perpignan and Jeanne was given the Château de Valmy (1888–1906) in Argelès-sur-Mer.

== Legacy ==
Pierre Bardou-Job died in Perpignan on 24 February 1892 at the age of 65. He died intestate, but his property was divided easily between his children. Jules Pams commissioned the architect Leopold Carlier to transform the mansion on rue St Sauveur, which Jeanne had inherited, into a lavishly decorated example of Belle Epoque taste. The Job brand had an estimated value of 1.2 million francs in 1892, and was held jointly by his heirs. They formed the Pierre Bardou-Job company, owned by Justin Bardou-Job, Charles Ducup de St Paul and Jules Pams, with headquarters on the rue Saint-Sauveur in Perpignan. Although there were some labor disputes, the company was generally paternalistic and gave good working conditions, in the spirit of Pierre Bardou-Job.

== Sources ==
- Jules PAMS (in French), Cote Vermeille, archived from the original on 2016-01-07
- Muchir, Claire, Jules Pams (1852-1930) et le musée des Beaux-Arts de Perpignan (in French), Les Amis des Bardou, archived from the original on 2016-03-04
- Murillo, François, "Pierre Bardou", Du papier et des hommes, entre tradition et industrie, mémoire d'un patrimoine (in French), Communauté de Communes de l'Agglomération Saint-Girons, archived from the original on 2016-03-04
- "On the Trail of the Laughing Elephant", P-O Life
- Praca, Edwige, L'Hôtel Pams à Perpignan : " Cette maison-là était un musée " (in French), Les Amis des Bardou, archived from the original on 2016-03-04
- Praca, E. (2004), "Perpignan à l'ère industrielle : l'exemple du papier à cigarettes Job (XIXe-début XXe s.)", Perpignan Une et Plurielle (in French), archived from the original on 2016-03-04
- Praca, E. (2007-11-01), "Château d'Aubiry Un trésor d'aquarelles", La Semaine du Roussillon (in French), archived from the original on 2016-02-05
- "Perpignan: hommage aux Bardou, héros industriels du Roussillon", Le Clau (in French), 2011-06-23
- Societe de Geographie de Marseille (1892), "Necrologie", Bulletin de géographie d'Aix-Marseille (in French)
