= Académie de la Grande Chaumière =

Art school in Paris, France

Coordinates: 48.8422°N 2.3304°E

Information
- School type: Art school
- Founded: 1904
- Director: (1909) Martha Stettler, Alice Dannenberg and Lucien Simon
- Website: www.academiegrandechaumiere.com

The Académie de la Grande Chaumière (French pronunciation: [akademi də la ɡʁɑ̃d ʃomjɛʁ]) is an art school in the Montparnasse district of Paris, France. The impeding closure of the school in July 2025 received major criticism from art heritage groups.

The school over the years had trained major figures of the School of Paris as well as being staffed by well-known artists.

== History ==
The school was founded in 1904 by the Catalan painter Claudio Castelucho on the rue de la Grande Chaumière in Paris, near the Académie Colarossi. From 1909, the Académie was jointly directed by painters Martha Stettler, Alice Dannenberg, and Lucien Simon. The school, which was devoted to painting and sculpture, did not teach the strict academic rules of painting of the École des Beaux-Arts, thus producing art free of academic constraints. One attraction was the low fees, even lower than those of the Académie Julian (which had to be paid in advance). It was said about the school that all that was provided was a model and warmth in the winter.

In 1957, the Académie de la Grande Chaumière was acquired by the Charpentier family, founders of the Charpentier Academy. It still operates under its original name, and provides two free workshops, one for painting and drawing, the other for sketches, as well as evening classes.

The Académie's building owner Yves Salats died in 2017, and the building was inherited by three different associations which decided to auction it for sale in 2018. The psychoanalyst Serge Zagdanski was named Director of the Académie in 2018.

In July 2025, the school faced closure with the building slated to be converted into a commercial project. The proposal and its developer Alexandre Garèse, who owns the school, drew major criticsm from conservation and artistic groups.

== Teachers ==
Artists by country
	Belarus	Ossip Zadkine
France	France	Jean Aujame – Jacques-Émile Blanche – Antoine Bourdelle – Yves Brayer – Gustave Courtois – Alice Dannenberg Co-director with Stettler – Charles Despiau – Othon Friesz – André Lhote – Édouard Georges Mac-Avoy – Émile-René Ménard – Jean Metzinger – René-Xavier Prinet – Lucien Simon – Auguste Leroux – Pierre Henri Vaillant – Robert Wlérick – Charles Picart Le Doux – Peter Lipman-Wulf
	Poland	Olga Boznańska
	United States	Margaret Ponce Israel
	Spain	Claudio Castelucho
	Switzerland	Eugène Grasset
	United Kingdom	Walter Sickert (for a time a weekly supervisor of Mlle. Stettler's classes)

== Former students ==
Artists by country
	Argentina	Noemí Gerstein – Alicia Penalba – Lino Enea Spilimbergo
	Australia	Lina Bryans – Bessie Davidson – Louis Kahan
	Belgium	Luc-Peter Crombé – Jos De Cock – Ghislaine de Menten de Horne – Konstantin Stefanovitch- Jacques Beeckmans – Berthe Dubail
Canada	Canada	Madeleine Laliberté – Arthur McKay – Marthe Rakine – Jean-Paul Riopelle – René Marcil – Julien Hébert
Chile	Chile	Juan Emar– José Perotti – Henriette Petit – Luis Vargas Rosas
Canada	China	Zao Wou-Ki – Pang Xunqin
	Colombia	Luis Caballero – Oscar Rodríguez Naranjo
	Croatia	Miroslav Kraljević
	Cuba	Amelia Peláez – Loló Soldevilla
	Czech Republic	Otto Gutfreund – Frantisek Kardaus
	Egypt	Daria Gamsaragan
	Estonia	Karin Luts – Konrad Mägi – Eduard Wiiralt
	Ethiopia	Alexander Boghossian
	Finland	Tove Jansson – Eero Nelimarkka – Eero Saarinen – Sam Vanni
France	France	Yolande Ardissone – René Aubert – Balthus – Guy Bigot – Louise Bourgeois – Jacques Bouyssou – Philippe Cara Costea – Jean Chapin – Jean Cortot – Marie-Alain Couturier – Jacques Daniel – Gabriel Dauchot – Paul Daviaud – Paul Deltombe – René Demeurisse – Amandine Doré – Robert Fontené – Serge Gainsbourg – Pierre Garcia-Fons – Germaine Gardey – Oscar Gauthier – Jean Gorin (1899–1981) – Étienne Hajdu – Jean Helleu – Raymonde Heudebert – René Iché – Richard Jeranian – Bernadette Kanter – Edmond Kiraz – Georges Lambert – Claude Lazar – Eugène Leroy – Carlo Maiolini – Marinette Mathieu – Jacques Mennessons – Marie-Lucie Nessi-Valtat – Alain Mongrenier – Lucile Passavant – Wilfrid Perraudin – Jean Piaubert – Richard de Prémare – Paul Rebeyrolle – Serge Rezvani – Colette Richarme – Germaine Richier – Maggie Salcedo – Jérôme Savary – Émile Savitry – Yo Savy – Michel Siret-Gille – Jeanne Socquet – André Stempfel – Michel Thompson – Victor Feltrin – René Olivier – Fernand Teyssier – Louis-Édouard Toulet – Pierre Toutain-Dorbec – Roger Weiss
	Germany	Alf Bayrle (1900–1982)- Charles Crodel – Peter Janssen – Katharina Heise – Albrecht von Urach
	Greece	Athanase Apartis – Sophia Laskaridou (1882–1965) – Socrate Sidiropoulos – Chryssa –
	Hungary	Elmyr de Hory – Anton Prinner – Árpád Szenes
	India	Chintamoni Kar – Krishna Reddy – Amrita Sher-Gil
	Ireland	Eileen Gray – Nano Reid – Patrick Swift – Seán O'Sullivan
	Israel	Yaacov Agam – Isaac Frenkel Frenel – Dani Karavan – Bezalel Schatz - Zohara Schatz - Avigdor Stematsky (1908–89)
	Japan	Kumi Sugai
	North Macedonia	Nikola Martinoski
	Mexico	Federico Cantu (1907–1989)
	Netherlands	Hubert Minnebo – Julie van der Veen
	New Zealand	Helen Stewart
	Peru	Elena Izcue
	Poland	Władysław Hasior – Tamara de Lempicka
	Portugal	Mário Cesariny de Vasconcelos – pt:Joaquim Lopes – pt:Maluda – Mily Possoz – Maria Elena Vieira da Silva – Carlos Botelho
	Romania	Margaret Cossaceanu – Ion Irimescu – Magdalena Rădulescu - Vasile Kazar
	Russia	Boris Anrep – Alexandra Exter – Willy Guggenheim – André Lanskoy – Serge Poliakoff – Alexander Sachal – Zinaida Serebriakova
	South Africa	Lippy Lipshitz
	South Korea	Seund Ja Rhee
	Spain	Ramiro Arrue – Joan Miró – es:Joaquín Peinado – es:Manuel Ángeles Ortiz – Benjamín Palencia – Alejandro Conde López – Eduardo Úrculo – Remedios Varo
	Sri Lanka	Harry Pieris
	Sweden	Bror Hjorth – Siri Derkert
	Switzerland	Arthur Aesbacher – Otto Charles Bänninger – Otto Baumberger – fr:Alfred Bolle – Rolf Brem – Hiram Brülhart – Serge Brignoni – fr:Raymond Buchs – Coghuf – de:Louis Conne – de:Otto Ernst Fritsch – Franz Fedier – Alberto Giacometti – Max Gubler – Willy Guggenheim dit Varlin – André Lasserre – Meret Oppenheim – Oswald Pilloud – Charles Rollier – Kurt Seligmann – de:Paul Stöckli – Victor Surbek – André Thomkins – fr:Robert Wehrlin – de:Otto Wyler – Jean Planque
	Turkey	Burhan Doğançay
	United Kingdom	Maxwell Armfield – Olivia Mary Bryden – John Craxton – Keith Henderson – Vivien John – Jacques Kupfermann – Lowes Dalbiac Luard – Lewis Morley – Isabel Nicholas – Viola Paterson – Gertrude Mary Powys – Basil Rakoczi – Isabel Rawsthorne – Mary Remington – John Walker – Josefina de Vasconcellos
	United States	Ward Bennett – Helaine Blumenfeld – Alexander Calder – Granville Carter – Edward Clark (artist)- Warrington Colescott – William F. Draper – Fannie Eliza Duvall – Adolphus Ealey – Dorothy Eisner – Hanna Eshel - Joseph Erhardy – Birgitta Moran Farmer – John Ferren – Paul Fjelde – Anne Flournoy – Michael Frary – Roy Charles Gamble – Herbert Gentry – Paul Georges – Charles Ginnever – Adolph Gottlieb – Angela Gregory – Al Held -Raymond Hendler – Hans Hofmann – Jack Hooper – Sylvia Shaw Judson – Adaline Kent – Albert Kotin – Margaret Lefranc – Michael Loew – Frank Lobdell – Jeanne Patterson Miles – Richard E. Miller – Clare Turlay Newberry – Isamu Noguchi – Jules Olitski — fr:Bill Parker – Albert Pennoyer - Genevieve Pezet – Augusta Savage – Louis Schanker – Nat Mayer Shapiro – Irene Sharaff – Cesare Stea – George L. Stout – Shinkichi Tajiri – Beth Van Hoesen - Bradley Walker Tomlin – Laura Wheeler Waring
	Ukraine	Youla Chapoval; Beliana
	Uruguay	José Cúneo – Amalia Nieto – Federico Moller de Berg
	Venezuela	Alirio Oramas – Tito Salas – Manuel Cabre–Elisa Elvira Zuloaga–Pascual Navarro

== See also ==
- School of Paris
- Art in Paris

== Sources ==
- Dr. Eric Cabris, Ph.D., Biografie van kunstschilder Ghislaine de Menten de Horne (1908–1995), Brussels, V.U.B., 2008, p. 4, footnote 3.
- Antoine Bourdelle, Laure Dalon, Cours & leçons à l'Académie de la Grande Chaumière, 1909–1929, Paris : Paris-Musées : Ed. des Cendres, 2008. ISBN 978-2-7596-0034-2
