= Sidiropoulos =

Sidiropoulos is a surname. Notable people with the surname include:

- Anastasios Sidiropoulos (born 1979), Greek football referee
- Pavlos Sidiropoulos (1948-1990), Greek rock musician
- Socrate Sidiropoulos, Greek painter and sculptor
- Theo Sidiropoulos, Greek–born Australian politician
- Ioannis Sidiropoulos (born 1956), Greek weightlifter
- Giorgos Sidiropoulos (1949–2015), Greek footballer
- Sotiris René Sidiropoulos (born 1977), French painter and sculptor
