= Bouwmeester =

Bouwmeester is a Dutch occupational surname meaning "master builder". Variant forms are Boumeester, Bouwmeesters, and Bouwmeister. Notable people with the surname include:

== Bouwmeester ==
- Dirk Bouwmeester (born 1967), Dutch quantum physicist
- Frans Bouwmeester (born 1940), Dutch footballer
- Gerrit Bouwmeester (1892–1961), Dutch footballer
- Hans Bouwmeester (born 1929), Dutch chess player
- Jack Bouwmeester (born 1999), Australian gridiron football player
- Jay Bouwmeester (born 1983), Canadian ice hockey player
- Lea Bouwmeester (born 1979), Dutch politician
- Lily Bouwmeester (1901–1993), Dutch actress, grandniece of Louis and Theo
- Louis Bouwmeester (1842–1925), Dutch actor, brother of Theo
- Marit Bouwmeester (born 1988), Dutch sailor
- Theo Bouwmeester (1850–1939), Dutch actress, sister of Louis

== Boumeester ==
- Christine Boumeester (1904–1971), Dutch visual artist active in France
- Huibert Boumeester (1900–1959), Dutch rower
- Huibert Gerard Boumeester (1831–1894), Dutch commander of the Royal Netherlands East Indies Army
