= Boise Art Museum =

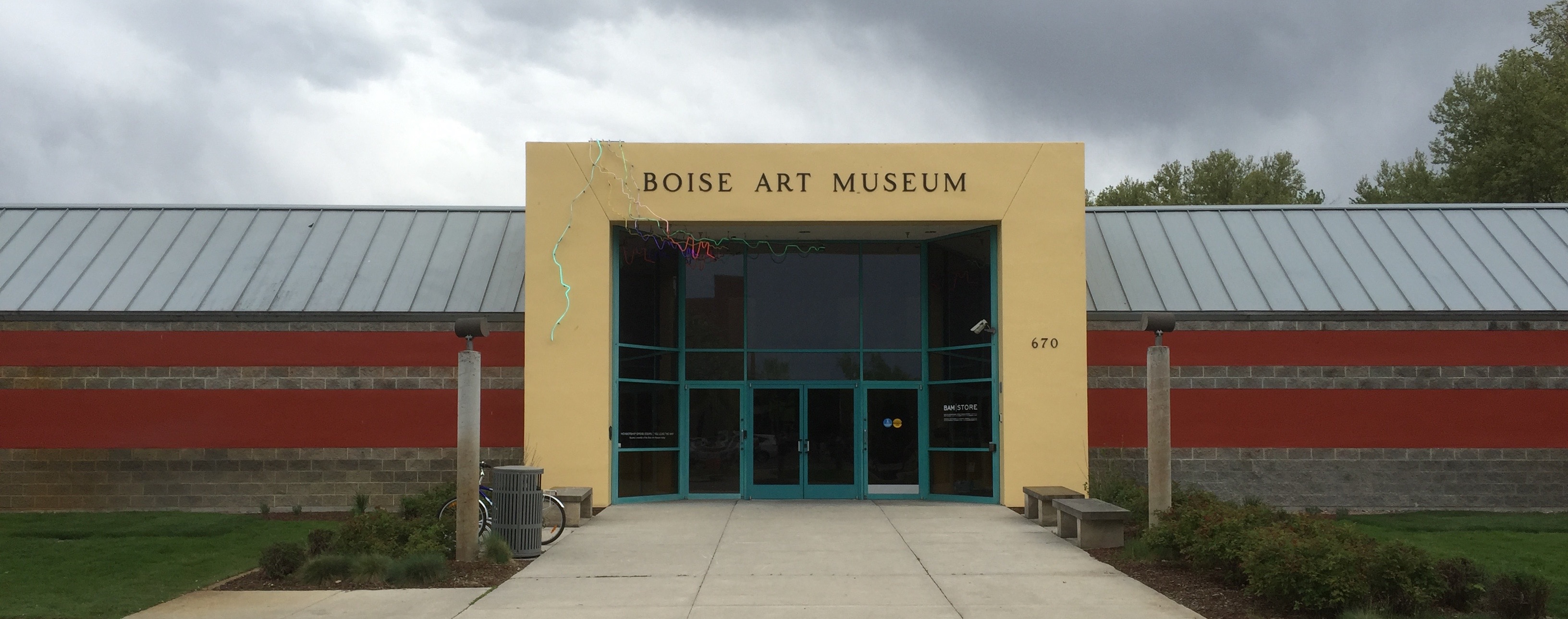
- Entrance of BAM in 2016
- Established: 1937
- Location: 670 Julia Davis Drive; Boise, Idaho
- Coordinates: 43°36′36″N 116°12′22″W
- Type: Art museum
- Collection size: 3,500 works
- Director: Melanie Fales
- Curator: Nicole Herden
- Website: www.boiseartmuseum.org

Boise Art Museum
- Interactive map of the Boise Art Museum area
- Former names: Boise Gallery of Art

General information
- Architectural style: Art Deco, Egyptian Revival, Postmodern
- Construction started: February 24th, 1934
- Completed: 1937
- Renovated: 1972, 1988, 1997

Design and construction
- Architects: Tourtellotte & Hummel (1937); Trout Architects and Mark Mack (1988); CSHQA (1997)

The Boise Art Museum (BAM) is located at 670 Julia Davis Drive in Boise, Idaho, and is part of a series of public museums and cultural attractions in Julia Davis Park. It is the permanent home of a growing collection of contemporary realism, modern and contemporary ceramics, as well as the largest public collection of works by acclaimed Idaho outsider artist and bookmaker James Charles Castle. The museum also features major traveling exhibitions and installations throughout the year.

The museum began as the Boise Gallery of Art, opening in 1937 through a partnership between the Boise Art Association, the City of Boise and the Federal Works Progress Administration as a space for people living in the Boise area to see local artists, traveling exhibitions and artwork on loan. The museum's original Art Deco and Egyptian Revival building was renovated in 1972 and again in 1988 when the name was changed to the Boise Art Museum and the museum increased focus on the development of a permanent collection and educational programming. In 1997, the museum was expanded again to include larger administrative offices, storage, a sculpture court and educational studios.

Today the Boise Art Museum is the only AAM accredited museum collecting fine art in Idaho and functions as a center for fine arts in the Treasure Valley.

== Collection ==
=== 1934–1988 ===
Collecting began under the Boise Art Association in 1934, who began amassing their collection before the Boise Gallery of Art had begun construction. The first work purchased by the Association was a painting by Harvey Gregory Pruscheck, for a cost of $100, after the painting was in their exhibition in the Boise Hotel (now the Hoff Building). Another early donation, the oil painting Mustard Field by Fanny Dike Burns, came in memory of the artist after the painting was included in a show in May 1933. By 1955, the small collection included works from the artists Helen Aupperle, Reeves Ulher, Olaf Moller, Robert Phillip, Alexis J. Fournier, W. Blair, W.E. Buhk, William Silva, LeConte Stewart, Luigi Kasimir, Warren Squires, Peter Hurd, Walt Disney, and Dorothy Andrews.

The 1960s saw an increase of interest in development of the collection as the Boise Gallery of Art increased exhibition programming and hired its first professional staff. A 1963 donation by Robert V. Hansberger of six oil paintings, then valued at $12,350, was the largest donation the Association had received to date. Adding to other gifts and donations earlier that year, it included Halcyon Days by Flavin Gabral, House for Rent and Precarious Position by Michael Frary, Sierra Grande by Richard Haines, Duet by Dan Lutz and From Hilltop by Eric Sloane. In 1967, the Association acquired Silvertone 17 Inch Portable Television, an assemblage by Edward Kienholz. Joseph Stewart, the then director of the Boise Gallery of Art, remarked of the sculpture:

An ordinary 17-inch portable television is no more or less significant than other products of 20th century technology. What makes them significant - from the social point of view - are the programs. Generally, television programs are absurd, juvenile and 'lacking in redeeming social significance'. In muting the television set, and in making it so heavy that two men can hardly lift it, Kienholz has snapped us from the spell of the networks. He forces us to look at his apparatus before which we spend so much time and around which we arrange family activities.

By 1969, the Boise Junior League had donated six works of art to the Boise Art Association, including a work titled Primaevus by artist Jimmie Faulkner and the marble sculpture Age of Innocence by Alfred Kober. In the same year, Louise Odencrantz of New York donated her collection of more than 100 dolls from various cultures after an exhibition where the dolls were allowed to be handled by children from the general public.

The Boise Gallery of Art's eagerness for a high-quality collection continued into the 1970s and '80s. According to Ric Collier, the then curator of art, the ideal collection for the Gallery should act as a record of the Gallery's exhibits, should demonstrate the Gallery's commitment to Idaho artists, and should help build the reputation of the Gallery in the field. In 1979, the Idaho Commission on the Arts gave the Gallery $2,000 to buy Idaho art, which they used to buy Last Black Triangle by Boyd Wright, as well as works by David Wharton, Charles Crist, and a commissioned work by Montana artist Dana Boussard. In 1980, the Gallery received donations from both the American Academy and Institute of Arts and Letters, of a work by Sam Francis, as well as the estate of the wife of Reginald Marsh, of four of the artist's works.

=== Since 1988 ===
The Boise Art Museum began actively collecting in 1988 under curator Sandy Harthorn, who helped develop the permanent collection to 1,200 objects in 1991 and to 3,500 by her retirement in 2015. According to Harthorn, changing the name from the Boise Gallery of Art to the Boise Art Museum changes how to think about the institution: "A gallery shows temporary exhibitions, whereas a museum collects and houses a permanent collection." The museum's collecting mission focuses on 20th century realism and ceramics from American, Northwest and Idaho artists. The collection has, however, amassed objects from across the United States, Europe and East Asia as growth of the collection has relied largely upon donations from artists, galleries and collectors.

In 2000, the Museum received 23 works of contemporary realism from Peter and Eileen Norton, a part of more than 1,000 works of art the then couple donated to 29 museums across the United States. The donation included works by Robert Rauschenberg, Robert Arneson, April Gornik, Lawrence Gipe, F. Scott Hess and Kent Twitchell. These works, most created in the 1980s and early 1990s, were selected to complement the collection of American realism previously donated by Sun Valley art collector Glenn C. Janss. This came after a donation of 166 works by American, Australian, British and Asian artists by John Takehara.

In 2002, Wilfred Davis Fletcher donated 117 artworks to the Museum, a gift valued at over $1 million. The collection consisted mostly of contemporary abstract works and was well received as a complement to the existing collection of realism.

== Architecture ==
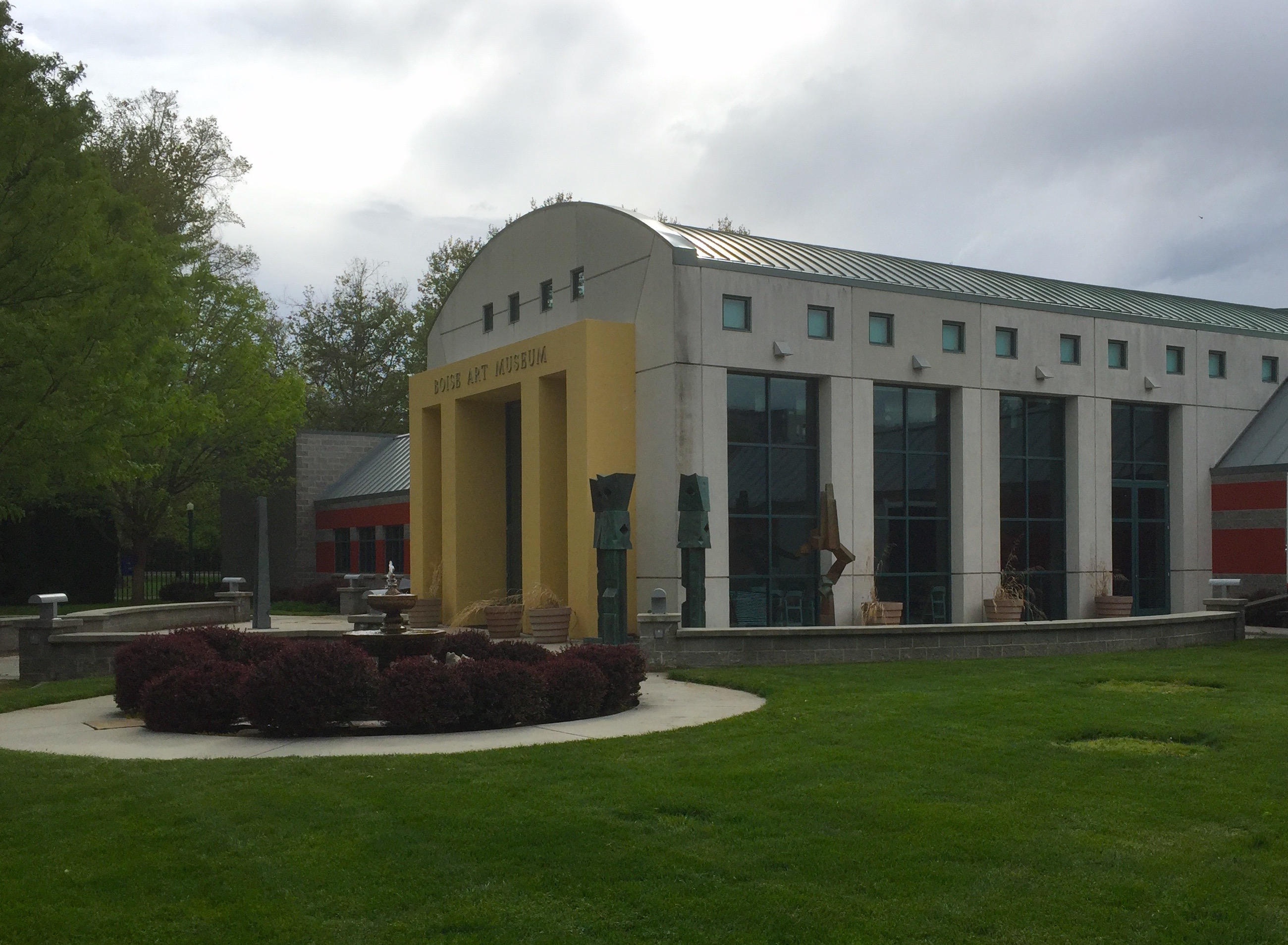
Sculpture court and garden built by CSQHA in 1998

The last addition in 1997-8 was managed by the local architecture firm, CSHQA, and added the distinctive sculpture court and sculpture garden to the rear of the building. This increased its facilities by 13,800 square feet to a total of 34,800 square feet.

== History ==
The Boise Art Association was founded on October 8, 1931. At the first meeting, which more than 50 people attended, the articles of incorporation adopted gave the purpose of the organization "to create in the minds of Boise and other Idaho people an increased appreciation for the fine and applied arts; to make a collection of works of art; to receive gifts and bequests for the use of the Boise Art Association and to acquire and maintain a suitable gallery in which works of art may be displayed."

== See also ==
- Julia Davis Park
