= Marie Raymond =

French sculptor, painter, and designer (1908–1988)

- Born: Marie Josephine Raymond; 4 May 1908; La Colle-sur-Loup, Alpes-Maritimes, France
- Died: 3 November 1988 (aged 80); Paris, France
- Known for: Painting
- Movement: Abstract Expressionism
- Spouse: Fred Klein (m. 1926; div. 1961)
- Children: Yves Klein
- Website: marieraymond.com

Marie Raymond (4 May 1908 – 3 November 1988 ) was a French sculptor, painter, and designer. A representative of the Tachisme movement, Raymond was one of the most successful painters of the post-war abstract movement in Paris. Raymond's success story remains unknown as she was eclipsed by her son's success. Although many female artists were known for being put in their husband's shadows, few were put in their son's shadows. Her son, Yves Klein, today remains one of the most prominent figures of the nouveau réalisme movement. However, in the 50s, one was more likely to fall upon a painting by Raymond than her son. Raymond would go on to become a prominent social figure in the Parisian post-war movement until the death of Yves Klein which had a profound impact on her life and art.

== Early life ==
Raymond was born on 4 May 1908 in La Colle-sur-Loup to a wealthy family from Provence. Her father was a pharmacist and owned a dispensary which the family-owned for 40 years. She attended boarding school at the school of the Blanche de Castille in Nice. During her youth, she started painting in Alexandre Stoppelaëre's studio in Cagnes-sur-Mer. Her time spent in Stoppelaere's studio had a profound influence on her connection to art. The inspiration she gained from the Mediterranean sea and colors from Southern France had an impact on Raymond's later work.

Many artists visited the South of France for inspiration, especially in Cagnes-sur-Mer. The Dutch-Indonesian painter, Fred Klein came to the South where he met Marie Raymond in 1925. The following year, on 26 October, the couple got married in Nice, when Raymond was only 18 years old. The couple moved to Paris where they lived a bohemian life in the neighborhood of Montparnasse. Some say that her artistic life only started when she met her husband, as prior to meeting him she had never left the South of France or seen a painting dating before her period.

In 1939, Europe was hit by WW2 which forced the family to move back to Cagnes-sur-Mer. This period during the war (1939-43) was an important period for Raymond as the nature of the South of France inspired her new series called ‘Paysages imaginaires’(1941-44). Between the period of 1941 to 1943, we can notice the naturalistic elements in the background of her paintings. She discovered Picasso's work during the war which urged her to dive into abstraction. She started making references to the impressionist and surrealist eras in the way she manipulated colors. Her first series of abstract paintings were highly important to her as they symbolized the difficult times of the war. During their refuge from the war in Nice, the painter met Nicolas de Stael with whom she worked very closely. Stael influenced her work, as after their encounter she devoted her style to pure abstraction painting.

== Post-war liberation and the late 40s ==
After the war ended in 1943, the family moved back to their apartment on Rue d’Assas in Paris. The post-war liberation movement had an impact on Raymond as in 1944 she abandoned references to landscapes and nature and started focusing on organizing shapes, colors, and lines in her paintings. She started adopting a technique of abstract and non-figurative art, abstaining from geometric art and instead focusing on linear techniques. She continued to use strong colors but ensured to keep the colors within the shapes creating homogenous paintings. She no longer separated her lines and colors but instead combined them together. Her work during this time period was described as a colorist patchwork due to her distinguished use of colors and lines.

In 1945, Raymond participated in her first major exhibition at the ‘salon des surindependant’. This exhibition was the first time Raymond adopted her maiden name ‘Raymond’ and abandoned her legal marriage name to ensure that her work would not be confused with her husband's.

During this fair, the journalist Charles Estienne who worked for the chronicle ‘combat’, noticed her works alongside those of Jean Deyrolle, Gerard Schneider, Serge Poliakoff, Hans Hartung. These five painters were important figures of the post-war avant guard abstract movement. In 1946, following the exhibition, Estienne assembled the works of these 5 artists and displayed them at Denise René’s gallery which he called “Peinture abstraite”. This exhibition will become a turning point for the artist, as she was the only woman in the group of artists. After the exhibition, Raymond was offered many artistic offers. In July 1946, she participated in the first ‘Salon des Réalités nouvelles’, from then on Raymond became one of the most prominent artistic discoveries of the 40s. Robert Fleck stated that “Raymond is the only female painter to experience such a rapid rise in post-war France”. In 1949, Marie won the Kandinsky prize alongside Youla Chapoval and exhibited at the Galerie Beaune “Les gouaches de Marie Raymond” and participated in the first São Paulo Biennale in Brazil.

== Lundi de Raymond ==
After the war, it was important for artists to have regular rendez-vous for artists to stand up for abstract art and to support one another. Following her exhibition ‘peintures abstraites’, the 5 artists took the habit of meeting in Denise René's apartment every Thursday. Raymond recreated this meeting point for post-war artists by opening up her apartment studio rue d’Assas every Monday for all her friends in the art sphere to meet. The ‘Lundis de Marie Raymond’ assembled many French and European artists, art critics, photographers, and gallery owners. Some of the emblematic figures to attend this event were Gerard Schneider, Pierre Souage, Colette Allendy, Charles Estienne, Willem Sandberg, and many more. The couple was socially very involved in the Parisian art scene. Hereby is a famous photograph of a Christmas Eve in 1949 with Pierre Soulages, Gerard Schneider, Fred Klein, Marie Raymond, and young Yves Klein. This meeting space was a way for post-war artists to defend their ideas of abstract art. Soulage stated in an interview in 2019 that he came over many times with his wife Collette to Raymond's Mondays. Additionally, it enabled Nina Kandinsky to have important encounters with many artists after the death of her husband. The ‘Lundi de Raymond’ demonstrated that she did not only have an artistic impact with her art but also in the artistic social sphere. She created a sphere and center for exchange which helped forge many artistic relationships and collaborations.

== Raymond and her impact on younger generations ==
Raymond did not solely invite artists representing abstract art in the 50s to her weekly Monday nights, she additionally invited young avant-guard French artists. Her son Yves Klein was given the opportunity at one of the soirees to project his recent film which he had executed on his recent trip to Japan. Likewise, she supported some of Klein's friends such as Raymond Hains and Cezar whom she invited to her weekly Monday events. Moreover, she invited the art critic Pierre Restany and a future important gallery owner Iris Clert. These encounters with the younger generation showed Raymond's attention and care for the future artistic generations to which her son belonged. Raymond held an important relationship with these artists of the 60s with whom she kept strong relationships throughout her life. In an interview held in 2004, when asked about her ‘Lundi de Raymond’ she would first recall the name of the younger artists such as Heins or Villegle instead of the more famous figures of the 50s. The death of her son Klein had a deep impact on her relationship with his friends which may be one of the main reasons for her strong bond with them after his death. Artists such as Hains continued to visit Raymond at Rue d'Assas until her death. Vanoosten suggests that her care and attention toward the younger generation is another reason for her uniqueness in the artistic scene.

== Marie Raymond as an art critic ==
Starting in 1946, Raymond additionally worked as an art critic for a column in a Dutch magazine called ‘Kunst en Kultuur’. Her work as an art critic in the Netherlands made her an ambassador of Parisian artistic news in the Netherlands. Between 1939 and 1958 Raymond published numerous chronicles on abstract art in Paris. Her rubric was called “Kunst in Paris” (Art in Paris). Raymond asserted her admiration for abstract art right from the start as she talked so fondly of the movement in her first chronicle in June 1939 which she named “lyrical abstraction truth”. The chronicle was a way for Raymond to defend her movement and what it stood for. Raymond talked about her visits to exhibitions or in galleries displaying abstract artists throughout Paris. During the 50s Raymond was one of the only artists to be writing about the paintings of other artists. Her critiquing and outlook of her friend's work showed her uniqueness and true devotion to art.

Raymond used her chronicle to bring light to Dutch painters in the Parisian scene such as the Bram brothers, Nicolas Warb, Geer van Velde and Christine Boumeester. Raymond's most powerful chronicle was deemed to have been her interview with Matisse in 1958 discussing his opposition to the abstract movement. Raymond ended her work with Kunst en Kultuur in 1958 as it coincided with the fall of the abstract movement. She believed that it was time for her son's new generation to take over. Her last chronicle in January had on its cover the famous monochrome blue of Yves Klein. This last chronicle was a tribute to her son and the new wave of the nouveau réalism art movement in the 60s.

Marie Raymond published in a Belgian chronicle called +-o (plus ou moins) between 1976 and 1983. Raymond used her platform at that time to defend the nouveau réalism movement that her son belonged to. Moreover, Raymond found it truly important to defend and honor her son's art after his premature death, therefore she dedicated many paragraphs to his work and impact on the art movement in the 60s.

== Marie Raymond in the 50s ==
The 50s was an escalating time period in Raymond's success, as her work traveled all around the world. She exhibited her work alongside Arp, Domela, Magnelli, and Poliakoff at a traveling exhibition called ‘Klar Form - 20 artists of the Parisian school’ organized by Denise René. The exhibition traveled all around Europe; Copenhagen, Helsinki, Stockholm, Oslo, and Liege. In 1952, Raymond was selected to take part in the ‘salon de Mai’ presented at the Kamakura museum in Japan. Moreover, Fred and Marie were exhibited together for three days at the Franco-Japanese Institute of Tokyo and at the Museum of Art in Tokyo, organized by their son Yves during his voyage to Japan. Finally, Raymond was offered a solo show at the Museum of Modern Art of Kamakura.

In 1956, the gallery Colette Allendy organized a monographic exhibition on Raymond. Following this exhibition, in 1957, the Stedelijk Museum in Amsterdam dedicated the artist's first retrospective called ‘Marie Raymond’. The collection assembled at the Stedelijk Museum was additionally presented in La Colle-sur-Loup the same year.

In 1958, Raymond and Fred Klein separated. On 6 June 1962, Raymond's only son Yves Klein who would later become an emblematic figure of the nouveau réalisme movement died of a heart attack. The loss she suffered from his passing immensely influenced her later works, following his death she started a new series of abstract art (Astres-figures, effusions lyrique, astres dans l’ombre, paysage d’astres).

In 1959, Marie was presented alongside her son in Germany at the inauguration of the Gelsenkirchen Opera. Finally, in 1960, Raymond received the Marzotto prize alongside Pierre Dmitrienko.

== Yves Klein and Mary Raymond's relationship ==
Yves Klein was Marie's only son, who also followed in the same footsteps as his parents and devoted his life to art. Raymond had a profound impact on Yves' outlook on art. He was deeply inspired by his mother's work, especially in terms of her use of color. Raymond helped propel Yves's career, especially through her weekly Monday sessions. Restany, the creator of the nouveau réalisme movement, was a regular visitor of the apartment on Rue d’Assas. The cultural and social environment Yves was brought up in, helped him understand the art sphere.

The second important impact Raymond had on Yves was their shared interest in the Rosicrucianism Roman Catholic Church. Rosicrucianism is an esoteric variant of the Catholic faith. Max Heindel describes the religion as a reform of mankind and reconnection with the spiritual realm. Raymond combined her faith and her vibrant colors to enable her viewers to transcend into the material world. Raymond's aim was for viewers to enter the spiritual world through the windows of colors in her work. Heindel's theory was that the spirit is identical to space, which is represented by the color blue as it represents infinite expansiveness. Klein reflected his spirituality in his monochrome blue paintings. His works were intended to look into ‘the depths of infinite space/spirit itself, gazing, as it were, into the coming age of Aden’.

Marie and Yves were very close and she devoted much of her time to him. Robert Fleck stated that “in order to understand the depth and energy of Yves Klein's work, one has to understand the profound impact his mother had on him”. Yves died prematurely on 6 June 1962. Raymond is said to have never recovered from his death. Gazier stated that when he died something in her died too.

== Yves Klein's death and impact on her art ==
Following Yves's death, Raymond's artistic style shifted. Raymond found refuge from her grievance in her paintings. Between June 1962 and the ‘Salons des réalités nouvelles’ in 1965, she abstained from exhibiting.

After her loss, she found inspiration in the cosmos and in the esotercisitic faith. Starting in 1964, she started a new series of paintings called abstraction-figures-astres. Raymond practiced yoga and had been introduced to Eastern spirituality and meditation by her brother-in-law. Her new style attempted to portray her spacial anxieties through pictorial forms diametrically opposite. She shifted the abstract space she created during the 1950s to two figures crossed by elaborated spaces in structural manners.

Raymond died in 1988 in Paris and was buried in the cemetery in La Colle-sur-Loup alongside Yves.

== Work ==
Raymond's work is in the collection of the Museum of Modern Art and the Stedelijk Museum Amsterdam. In 2023 her work was included in the exhibition Action, Gesture, Paint: Women Artists and Global Abstraction 1940-1970 at the Whitechapel Gallery in London. She also had notable exhibitions, such as "Marie Raymond Forty Years of Abstract Painting" at the Pascal de Sarthe Gallery in San Francisco in October 1988, and "Marie Raymond - In Retrospect, Works from 1946 to 1979" at the Pascal de Sarthe Gallery in Los Angeles from April 11 to June 8, 1991.
