= Richard de Prémare =

French painter (1936–2026)

- Born: Richard Dumouchel de Prémare; 6 May 1936; Casablanca, French protectorate in Morocco
- Died: 14 February 2026 (aged 89); Aigneville, France
- Education: Académie Charpentier; Académie de la Grande Chaumière
- Occupation: Painter

Richard Dumouchel de Prémare (French: [ʁiʃˈaʁ dymuʃˈɛl dˈə- pʁemˈaʁ]; 6 May 1936 – 14 February 2026) was a French painter who specialised in figurative art.

The sixth child of Robert Dumouchel de Prémare and Catherine Maître, he attended the Académie Charpentier and the Académie de la Grande Chaumière. He became well known in the world of figurative art and received praise from André Flament and Élisabeth Amyot.

De Prémare died in Aigneville on 14 February 2026, at the age of 89.

== Illustrated books ==
- Témoin parmi les hommes (written by Joseph Kessel, 1974)
- Sidi Abd-Er-Rahman El-Medjub (written by Alfred-Louis de Prémare, 1985)

== Notable expositions ==
=== Individual ===
- Chetkin Gallery (Red Bank, New Jersey, 1999/2002/2008)
- BAM Gallery (Toulouse, 2007)
- La Galerie (Ajaccio, 2009)
- Château de Varengeville-sur-Mer (Varengeville-sur-Mer, 2013)
- Collège des Jésuites de Chaumont (Chaumont, 2015)
- Château d'Eu (Eu, 2016)
- Château de Varengeville-sur-Mer (Varengeville-sur-Mer, 2019)

=== Collective ===
- Michel Jouenne, Richard de Prémare, Jean-Laurent Padovani, La Galerie (Ajaccio, 1991)
- Festival des Arts et du Manoir, Manoir de Briançon (Criel-sur-Mer, 2009)
- Corsica, La Galerie (Ajaccio, 2012)
- Salon de peinture de Condé-sur-Noireau (Condé-sur-Noireau, 2017)
