= Youla Chapoval =

Ukrainian-French painter (1919–1951)

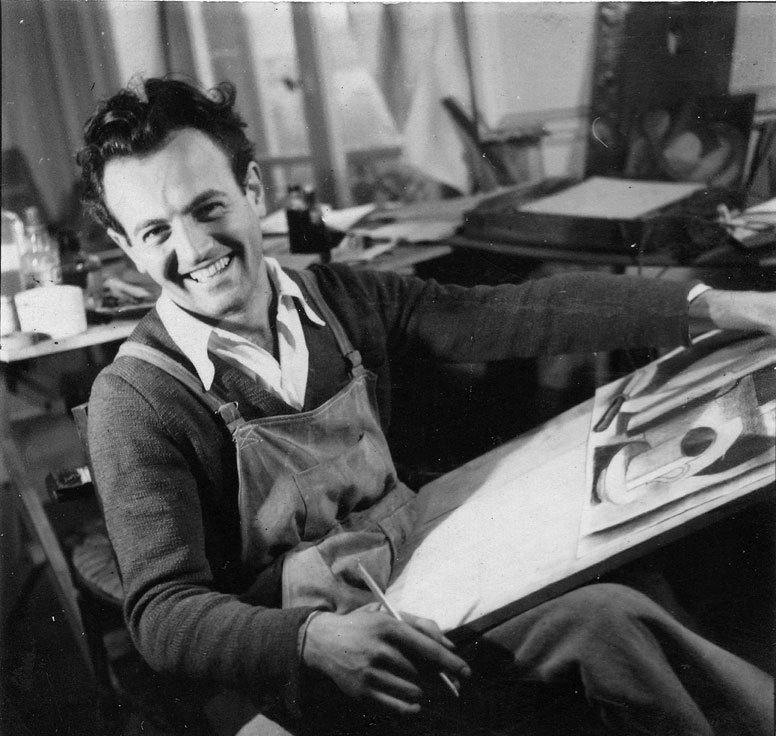
- Born: Юлій Шаповал; Youli Chapova; 3 November 1919; Kyiv, Kiev Governorate, Ukrainian SSR (now Ukraine)
- Died: 16 or 17 December 1951 (aged 32); 18th arrondissement of Paris, France
- Body discovered: 19 December 1951
- Other names: Jules Chapoval; Jules Schapoval
- Education: Académie de la Grande Chaumière; École des beaux-arts de Toulouse; École des beaux-arts de Marseille
- Spouse: Jeanne Despujols (m. 1944; div. 1949)
- Relatives: Beliana (sister)
- Awards: Kandinsky Prize, 1949

Youla Chapoval (Note: Francized as Jules Chapoval and Jules Schapoval.) (né Youli Chapova; Ukrainian: Юлій Шаповал; 3 November 1919 – 19 December 1951) was a Ukrainian-French painter.

== Early life and education ==
Youli Chapova (Ukrainian: Юлій Шаповал) was born on 3 November 1919 in Kyiv to a Jewish-Ukrainian family. The youngest of three children, Chapoval was the younger brother of Beliana, a painter, opera singer and concert pianist.

Following the Russian Revolution, the family left Ukraine and settled in Paris in 1924. In November 1938, Chapoval met Pablo Picasso. Developing a close friendship, Chapoval began to paint. In 1941, Chapova abandoned his medical studies and devoted himself to painting.

In 1942, Chapoval settled in the Rue du Faubourg-Saint-Jacques and began studying at the Académie de la Grande Chaumière and the École des beaux-arts de Toulouse. Following the Vel' d'Hiv roundup, Chapoval fled to Marseille and began studying at the École des beaux-arts de Marseille. In Marseille, Chapoval met the art critic Roger van Gindertaël. During this period Chapoval painted in a figurative and realist style.

== Career ==
In 1943, Chapoval's mother, Vera Shapoval (1883–1943), and eldest sister died in Auschwitz. Following the Liberation of Paris, Chapoval returned to the capital.

From 1945 onwards Chapoval painted in an abstract-geometric style and became part of the New School of Paris. In 1946, Chapoval's work began to take on Cubist elements and was influenced by the work of Juan Gris, Albert Gleizes and André Lhote.

In 1949, Chapoval won the Kandinsky Prize alongside Marie Raymond.

== Personal life ==
In 1944, Chapoval married Jeanne Despujols. Chapoval and Despujols later divorced in 1949.

On 19 December 1951, Chapoval's sister Beliana and his friends grew increasingly concerned by his lack of contact. Arriving at his home, Chapoval was found dead in his bed with a book in his hand. Chapoval is estimated to have died between 16 and 17 December in his home in 18th arrondissement of Paris.
