= Noemí Gerstein =

Argentine artist, sculptor (1910–1996)

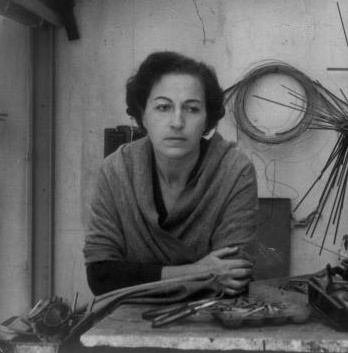
- Gerstein in 1964
- Born: November 10, 1910; Buenos Aires, Argentina
- Died: June 14, 1996 (aged 85); Buenos Aires, Argentina
- Known for: Sculpture; Illustration; Plastic art

Noemí Gerstein was born on November 10, 1910, in Buenos Aires to Jewish parents from Odesa, and she continued to live and work there.

In 1934, she began training under Alfredo Bigatti. In the 1950s, she received a government grant to travel to France, where she studied at the Académie de la Grande Chaumière in Paris under the tutelage of Ossip Zadkine. In 1952, Gerstein was one of the winners of the Institute of Contemporary Arts' design competition for the Unknown Political Prisoner Monument. Gerstein's works were predominantly abstract, and she "experimented with new materials." She had a preference for metallic constructions, such as Constellation (1963), which used small pieces of tubing. She died on June 14, 1996.

== Selected works ==
- Monumento al prisionero político desconocido (1953)
- Madre e hijo (1953)
- Maternidad (1954)
- La familia (En ocasiones llamada "El Oráculo") (1960)
- El samurai (1961)
- Los amantes (1961)
- Nacimiento (1961)
- Goliath (1961–62)
- Meteorito (1969)
- Achiras (1973)
- L’Art et L’Homme (1974)
- Seoane Músicos
- Milagro de la vida
- Seres híbridos (1978)

== Awards ==
- 1982, Konex Foundation Platinum Award - non-figurative sculpture
