= Beliana =

Ukrainian-French painter, opera singer and pianist (1911–1992)

- Белиана
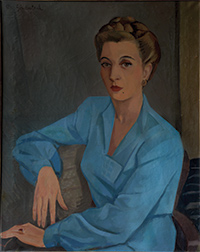
- Beliana painted by Van Gindertaêl, 1945
- Born: Белла Шаповал; Bella Chapoval; 13 July 1911; Kyiv, Kiev Governorate, Russian Empire (now Ukraine)
- Died: 1 August 1992 (aged 81); 9th arrondissement of Paris, France
- Education: Académie de la Grande Chaumière
- Occupations: Painter; opera singer; concert pianist
- Spouse: Michel Moisesco
- Children: 1
- Relatives: Youla Chapoval (brother)
- Musical career
- Also known as: Bella Sesco
- Instruments: Voice; piano

Bella Chapoval-Moisesco (née Chapoval (Note: Also cited as Schapoval.); Ukrainian: Белла Шаповал-Муазеско; 13 July 1911 – 1 August 1992), known as Beliana (Ukrainian: Белиана), was a Ukrainian-French painter, opera singer and concert pianist.

== Biography ==
Bella Chapoval (Ukrainian: Белла Шаповал) was born on 13 July 1911 in Kyiv to a Jewish-Ukrainian family. The second of three children, Beliana was the older sister of the painter Youla Chapoval.

Following the Russian Revolution, the family left Ukraine and settled in Paris in 1924. Beliana first worked as a concert pianist and later began her opera career under the pseudonym Bella Sesco. In 1943, Chapoval's mother, Vera Shapoval (1883–1943), and eldest sister died in Auschwitz.

Upon her brother's death in December 1951, Beliana devoted herself to painting. Beliana studied at the Académie de la Grande Chaumière.

== Personal life ==
Beliana was married to Michel Moisesco. Beliana and Moisesco had one son.

On 1 August 1992 Beliana died in the 9th arrondissement of Paris, aged 81.
