= Colette Richarme =

French painter (1904–1991)

- Born: Colette Richarme; 24 January 1904
- Died: 27 February 1991 (aged 87)
- Education: Académie de la Grande Chaumière
- Known for: Paintings and drawings
- Movement: Expressionism between figuration and abstraction

Colette Richarme (born 24 January 1904 in Canton (Guangzhou), China, died in Montpellier, 27 February 1991) was a French painter.

== Biography ==
Richarme spent her childhood in China. Her mother, familiar with art, taught her to observe her surroundings and to draw from an early age. The sudden death of her father, a silk trader for a British firm, forced mother and daughter to return to France just before the First World War. They lived in Lyon and Albertville, where Richarme married in 1926. The couple's move to Paris in 1935 provided access to the workshops of the Académie de la Grande Chaumière where Richarme was a classmate of Louise Bourgeois. But it was in Montpellier that she really began her career as an artist, presenting her first solo exhibition in 1941. After the war, she maintained regular contact with Paris (exhibitions, annual salons) while actively participating in regional artistic life. Until the end of her life she continued her research in her Languedoc studio.

== Exhibitions ==
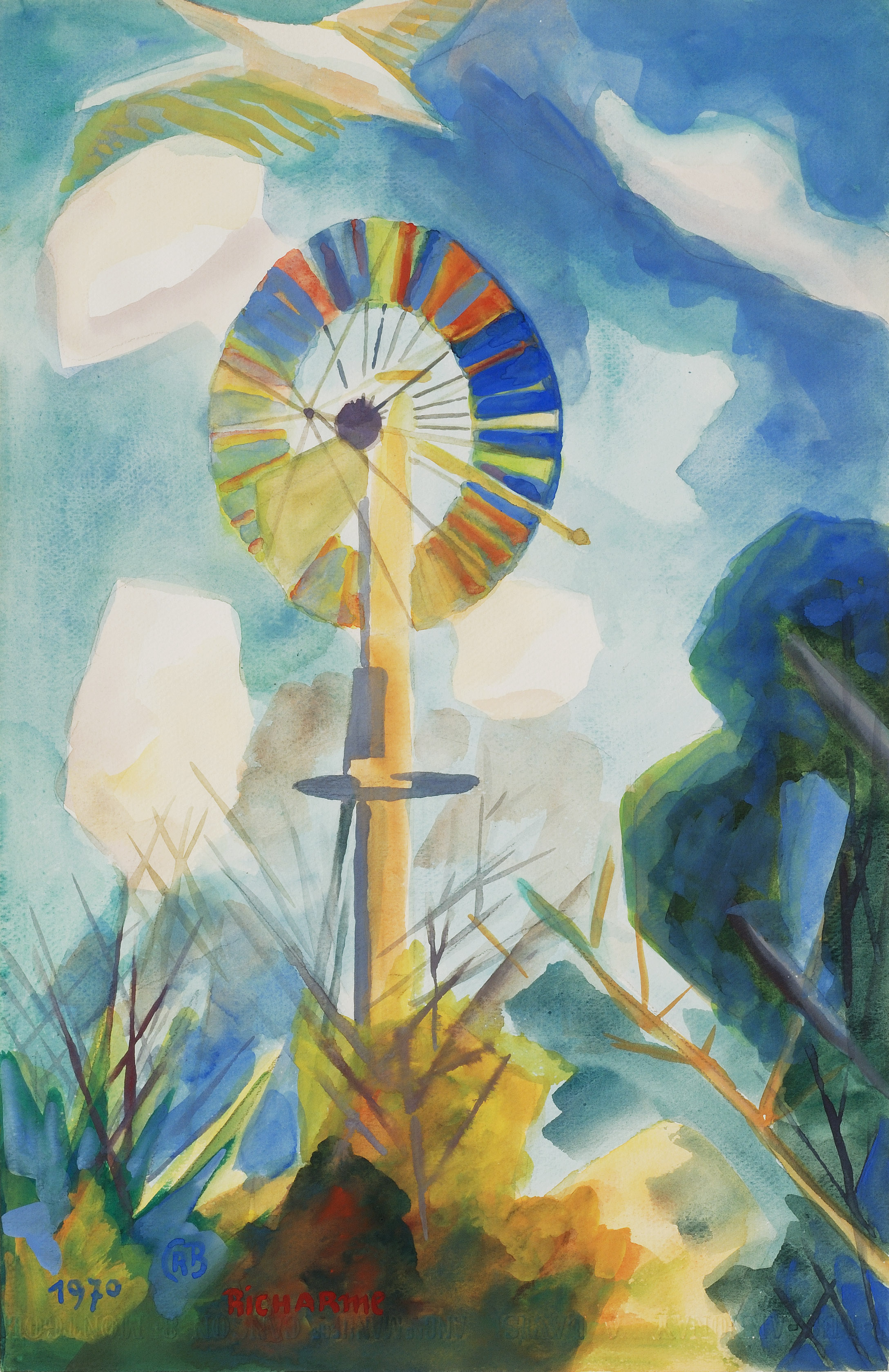
L'éolienne plein ciel, 1970 Gouache on paper, 50x32 cm

=== Solo exhibitions ===
- In Paris: Galeries Bruno Bassano, Jacob, 55, Arlette Chabaud, la Roue, Rond-Point des Champs Élysées, Freddy Noël, Danièle Drouant
- In Montpellier: In her lifetime, exhibitions every 2 years between 1941 and 1989
- In regions: Albertville, Avignon, Bagnols-sur-Cèze, Béziers, Cannes, Grasse, Lyon, Nîmes, Perpignan, Pont-Saint-Esprit, Sète, Villeneuve-lez-Avignon

=== Group exhibitions ===
- Paris salons: Les Artistes Français, Salon d'Automne, Société nationale des beaux-arts, les Indépendants, Société de dessin de l'école française
- In Paris: Galerie Welter, Galerie de l'ouest, Galerie Besnard, Galerie Christiane Vincent
- In regions: Angers, Antibes, Avignon, Bédarieux, Bonnieux, Bourges, Cannes, Castres, Cavaillon, Céret, Châteauneuf-du-Pape, Clermont-Ferrand, Dijon, Évian, Fontaine-de-Vaucluse, Grandvilliers, Juvisy-sur-Orge, La Grange de Meslay, Lamalou-les-Bains, Lavérune, L'Isle-sur-Sorgues, Lyon, Macon, Menton, Montauban, Montélimar, Montpellier, Narbonne, Nice, Nyons, Orange, Sète, Toulouse, Vaison-la-Romaine, Valréas, Vichy, Villefranche-sur-Mer, Villeneuve-lez-Avignon.

== Publications ==
- Oscar Wilde, Salomé, illustrated by Richarme, Montpellier, les Cent Regards, 2010
- Richarme, La danse, Montpellier, les Cent Regards, 2011
- Richarme, Équivalences plastiques, 9 poèmes de Stéphane Mallarmé, Montpellier, les Cent Regards, 2011
- Richarme, Oradour, Montpellier, les Cent regards, 2011
- Richarme, Savoie, Dessins, gouaches et huiles 1920-1987, Montpellier, les Cent Regards, 2012
- Richarme, Léda, Montpellier, les Cent Regards, 2015

== Bibliography ==
- Richarme, Monographie, text by Robert Briatte, Jean-Louis Gourg, Max Rouquette, Lodève, La Jonque, 1984
- Richarme, Journal d’atelier suivi de Parcours d’artiste by Bernard Derrieu, Pézenas, Domens, 2000
- Richarme, Invitation à la mer, texts and gouaches selected and presented by Estelle Goutorbe, Marseille, Jeanne Lafitte, 2003
- Colette Richarme, une artiste, une vie, une œuvre, Jean-Luc Bourges, Albertville, musée, 2007
- Le Gard vu par les peintres, Frédéric Gaussen, Marseille, éditions Gaussen, 2009
- Richarme, au-delà du blanc, Françoise Renaud, Condom, C.L.C. Éditions, 2010
- L’Hérault vu par les peintres, Alain Laborieux et Robert Faure, Marseille, éditions Gaussen, 2012
