= Jos De Cock =

Belgian painter (1934–2010)

- De Cock in 1991
- Born: 15 January 1934; Kortrijk, West Flanders, Belgium
- Died: 10 October 2010 (aged 76); Paris, France
- Education: Académie de la Grande Chaumière
- Known for: Painting, watercolor, etching, sculpture
- Style: Symbolist
- Spouse: Pierre Restany

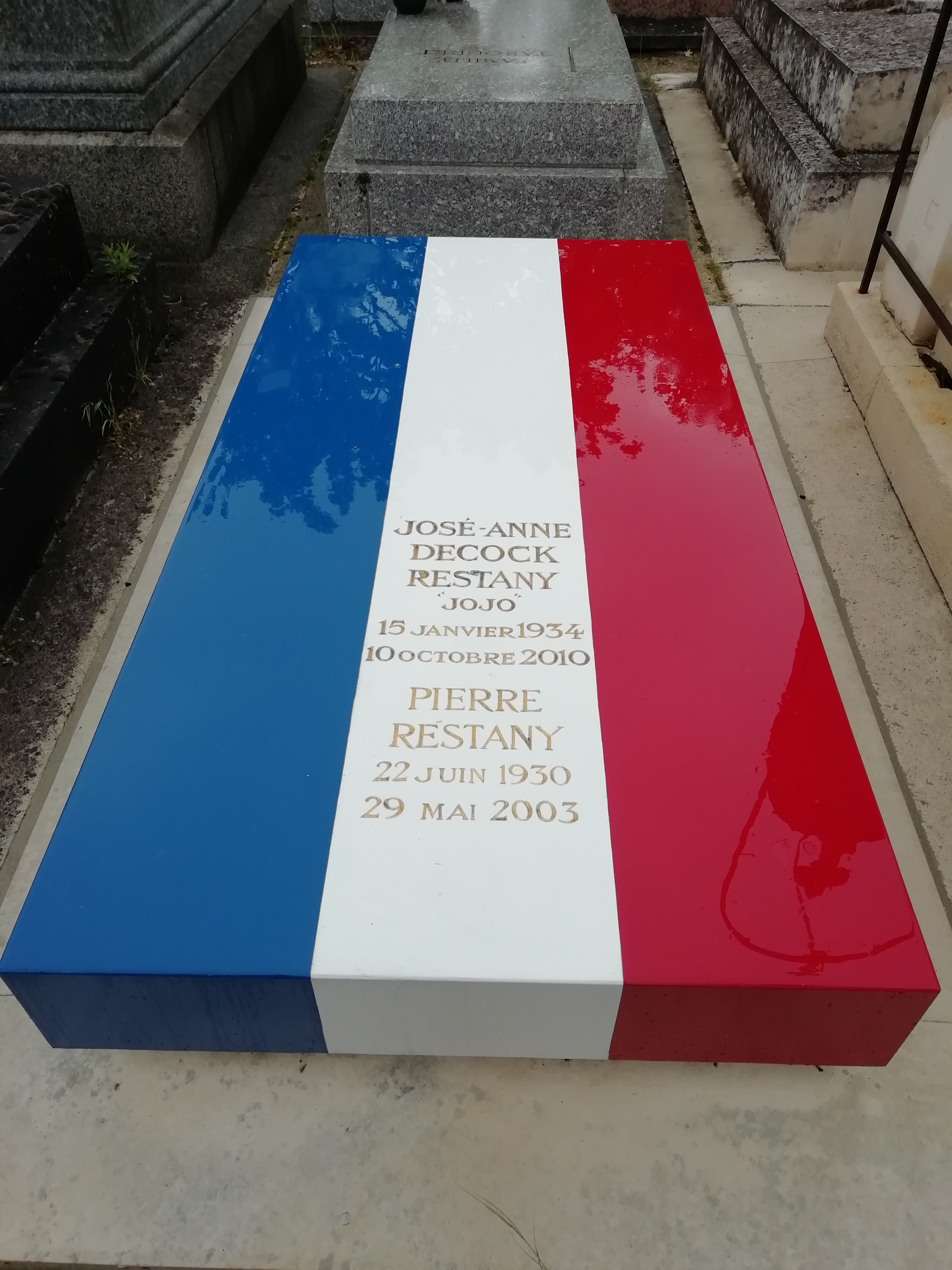
Tomb of Pierre Restany and Jos De Cock at Montparnasse Cemetery in Paris

Jos De Cock (15 January 1934 – 10 October 2010), was a Belgian-French painter, watercolorist, etcher and sculptor.

She is also known as Jojo Restany, Josiane De Cock, José-Anne Decock Restany, Josianne de Koch, Jose-Anne Martine Paulette Decock, Josyane, or Josée-Anne.

== Education ==
Jos De Cock received her training at the academy of Etterbeek (Belgium) and at the Académie de la Grande Chaumière in Paris. In Belgium, she also took courses with Edgard Tytgat and in France with André Lhote.

== Work ==
De Cock was active from 1956 until later in her life. Her work has been described as symbolism. De Cock's oeuvre is characterized by symbolist themes, exploring the interplay between the visible and the invisible, often delving into metaphysical and fantastical realms.

De Cock received the Prix de la Jeune Penture Belge in 1958, as well as an award from the Musée d'Art Moderne the same year. She received a medal from the City of Paris in 1960.

== Collections ==
De Cock's work is held in the permanent collections of the Museo De La Solidaridad Salvador Allende, the Musée d'Art Moderne de Paris and the Bibliothèque nationale de France, among others.

== Personal life ==
Later in life, De Cock married art critic Pierre Restany.

She is buried together with Pierre Restany at the Montparnasse cemetery in Paris.

== Select solo exhibitions ==
- 1956 Brussels, Belgium, Galerie Renoir
- 1956 Paris, France, Galerie Apollo
- 1956 Paris, France, Galerie Voyelles
- 1958 Paris, France, Galerie Colette Allendy
- 1958 Paris, France, Club des Quatre-Vents
- 1962 Knokke-le-Zoute, Belgium, Galerie du Casino
- 1963 Brussels, Belgium, Galerie Ravenstein
- 1963 Genève, Switzerland, Galerie Saint-Germain
- 1963 Liège, Belgique, A.P.I.A.W
- 1965 Paris, France, Galerie Saint-Luc
- 1967 Antwerp, Belgium, Galerie Campo
- 1970 London, United Kingdom, Roland, Browse et Delblanco
- 1977 Saint-Paul-de-Vence, France, Musée Municipal
- 1979 Paris, France, Galerie Jean-Pierre Lavignes
- 1980 Rio de Janeiro, Brasil, Galerie "Café des Arts"
- 1984 Montpellier, France, Musée Olivier Brice, Château de Cambous - Vios en Laval
- 1985 Nancy, France, Galerie Municipale, Hôtel de Ville
- 1986 Paris, France, Paris Art Center
- 1987 Paris, France, Galerie Eolia

== Bibliography ==
- José Pierre, Jos de Cock: And the secret unity of the world, 1987
- Paul Piron, De belgische beeldende kunstenaars uit de 19de en 20ste eeuw, Ohain : Éditions Art in Belgium, 1999 ISBN 9076676011
- Auction catalogue: Collection Pierre et Jojo Restany, Digard Auction, Paris, les 24 et 25 octobre 2015. https://docplayer.fr/78218411-Collection-pierre-et-jojo-restany-24-et-25-octobre-2015-digard-auction.html
- Patrick-Gilles Persin (préface), Jos Decock ou les Tentations fantasmagoriques, catalogue d'exposition, Paris Art Center, Paris, 1986
- Nam June Paik, Jos Decock: Dessins et aquarelles, exhibition catalogue, 23 April - 15 June 1988 at the Château de Nemours, preface by Pierre Restany, 1988.
- Auction catalogue: Les Années magiques 1954-1978 - Autour d'Iris Clert et Pierre Restany, Pierre Bergé & Associés, Paris, 29 mars 2009. https://cdn.drouot.com/d/catalogue?path=berge/design/29032009/290309_magique.pdf
- Pierre Cabanne (préface), Jos Decock, Les Cahiers Eolia Paris, 1987
- Théodore Koenig & Joseph Noiret, Revue Phantomas n°11/12, 1958
