= René Marcil =

Canadian painter and illustrator (1917–1993)

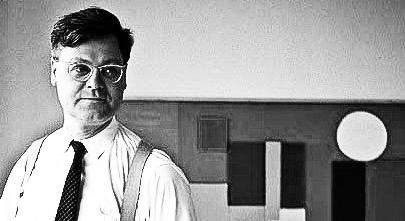
- Born: May 29, 1917; Montreal, Quebec, Canada
- Died: September 25, 1993
- Education: École des beaux-arts de Montréal, Académie de la Grande Chaumière
- Known for: Painter, Fashion illustrtor
- Notable work: Rider, Dévoile-moi tes charmes, Voulez-vous jouer avec moi?
- Movement: Neoplasticism, Abstract painting, Neo-expressionism
- Spouse: Evelyn Rowat (m.1941)

René Marcil (May 29, 1917 – September 25, 1993) was a Canadian Québécois artist, painter and fashion illustrator. He spent most of his professional life in New York, Paris, on the French Riviera and in London. Marcil played a central role in the successful post-war launch of Christian Dior's New Look collection in the United States.

== Fashion illustrator period ==
In 1939, Marcil established himself in New York city where from 1947 on, he worked as a fashion illustrator. His illustrations of models wearing what became known as Dior's "New Look" outfits contributed to the collection's appeal to American women. The expression "New Look" is believed to have been coined by Carmel Snow editor-in-chief of the American edition of Harper's Bazaar.

Writer and curator Alexander Fury wrote that by 1956, the house of Dior was responsible for generating half the total French haute couture exports to the USA. Time magazine reported: [Dior] is the Atlas, holding up the entire French fashion industry.

== Marcil Fashion illustrator extraordinaire @ the MAD housed in the Louvre ==
Mr. Olivier Gabet, Director of the Art Department of the Louvre Museum, writes :

"These (Marcil) fashion drawings, very representative of the style instigated by Tom Keogh at Vogue, provide an example for the history of fashion illustration from the late 1940s to the early 1960s."

Marcil played an important role in the post-war launch of Dior's New Look collection in the US market, particularly in NYC.

As echoed in the following excerpts from MAD's 2018 Annual Report pages 32 and 93:

" (...) these drawings – expressive and refined sketches – enable one to appreciate the dissemination of fashion trends in the media and the history of fashion illustration style."

"(... ) Nine drawings by the Canadian artist, René Marcil, complete the important set of fashion drawings with examples of reinterpretation of the models of the designer's collection for large department stores' advertising purposes around 1950, an aspect that was lacking until now in the museum's collection."

In his classic study, spanning seven decades in the art of fashion illustration in Vogue from 1920s to the 1980s, "Fashion Drawing in VOGUE" prefaced by David Hockney and published by Thames & Hudson, author William Packer writes on page 168 that "Marcil commanded an easy, running line and the flick of the pen and brush" and on page 204 that "Marcil's drawings are graphically most sophisticated."

== Neoplasticism & Abstract painting period ==
Marcil moved to Paris in the 50's and joined the Académie de la Grande Chaumière where he drafted models alongside Ed Clark and Tom Keogh. He lived in a high ceiling artist's studio on rue Séguier near the Quai des Grands-Augustins.

Le Delarge notes that Marcil's move to Paris: "introduced him to a taste for neoplasticism, for which he used bright colors..." and influenced Ellsworth Kelly and Ed Clark in a similar manner.

His work is described by his contemporaries as:

"... intense, luminous and has the quality of combining graphic design, great draftmanship, extraordinary color, fascinating surfaces ... [and] delicate poetic feeling." He [Marcil] communicates the pleasure he discovers in putting down his ideas, his facility with paint and his almost epicurean device in making his luminous surfaces come together without conflict... his glowing sensuous colors of his abstract paintings are bright, unmuddied, and they come movingly together, cleared of all inessentials."

As echoed in the following excerpt from Waddington's, Canadian Fine Art catalogue, 2021:

" While living in Paris, Marcil became a Montparno, a name for the artists and intellectuals who were regulars at the Montparnasse cafés and restaurants such as La Closerie des Lilas and brasserie La Coupole. He enjoyed discussions with his peers including Sonia Delaunay amongst others.

Marcil evolved towards Abstract Geometric and Abstract Figurative abstraction creating paintings composed of structured and irregular forms. Using his vivid Fauvist color palette, Marcil achieved a striking balance between form, color and space. He would often say, 'for me, abstract and figurative are one of the same.'

The van Diemen-Lilienfeld Galleries, 57th Street at Madison Avenue, New York exhibited Marcil's work from the mid-1950s until its closure in the mid-1960s. Curator Elizabeth Flinn from the Metropolitan Museum of Art, New York, refers to Marcil's work as 'poetic in color and composition.' Artworks by Marcil were included in a Modern Art group exhibition alongside paintings by Pollock and Magritte.

James Johnson Sweeney, director of The Solomon Guggenheim Museum, in a letter to Marcil on May 9, 1956, commented that "the free handling of your broad color area was very happy."

== Neo-expressionism period ==
Marcil later evolved towards Neo-expressionism sometimes called the New Fauves to better meet the meaning of the term. The style is characterized by intense subjectivity and rough handling of materials. During his Neo-expressionist period, Marcil was influenced by the Naturalism literary movement.

In one of his letters in 1986, Marcil writes:

" If I am talking to you about Dubuffet, Combas and Haring, it is because my work has been oriented in this direction for a long time...

A contemporary artist does not paint a picture for aesthetic reasons or for the sake of beauty if you prefer. Dubuffet was the first to place social thought above the artistic work and the latter only serves to define his thought ... even here in France, left-wing and right-wing politicians rejected his work, and his only supporters were writers and intellectuals. Fortunately, in Paris, there are always men (and women) who can express themselves freely because freedom of expression is something the French will never give up ...

Keith Haring's approach is excellent. In his good-natured style, he says very serious things."

The following excerpt from Cornette de Saint-Cyr, Paris, Art Contemporain catalogue, 2012 casts light on Marcil's work:

"The subject, form and flamboyant colors in Marcil's work represent an artistic language totally in tune with the new generation's aspirations of his time. This language was meant as a challenge to his peers ... In the hybrid repertoire so typical of Marcil, a common thread is his casual painting style inspired by daily life that it unmasks."

In one of his letters in 1989, Marcil writes:

" ... we are now moving out of a millennium of liberation and freeing, of energies, and into a period of implosion, going from a sort of maximum radiance and into a phase of social reversion – a gigantic reversion of a field once its saturation point has been reached. Stellar systems do not cease to exist either, once their radiating energy has dissipated – they implode according to a process which is slow at the outset and then progressively accelerates – they contract at an extraordinary rhythm and become involutive systems.

Large metropolises have perhaps become sites for implosion to occur, places for absorption, where society itself is reabsorbed including the golden era, contemporaneous to this twin concept of capital and revolution, is without a doubt ended.

The social is slowly and brutally involuting into an inert field which already envelops politics."

== Selected public collections ==
Marcil's artwork is present in the Collections Nationales de France, Ministère de la Culture de France and specifically, in the permanent collections of the Musée des Arts Décoratifs, Paris housed at the Louvre. In Canada, his work is included in the collection of the Art Gallery of Nova Scotia.

== Marcil Estate ==
The U.S. copyright representative for the Marcil Estate (Patrimoine Marcil) is the Artists Rights Society.

== Personal life ==
René Marcil had an illness as a child. He died of a heart attack in 1993.
