= Alice Dannenberg =

French painter

Alice Dannenberg (4 April 1861 – 28 June 1948) was an early 20th century French painter of Russian origin who cofounded an art school in Paris, the Académie de la Grande Chaumière.

== Biography ==
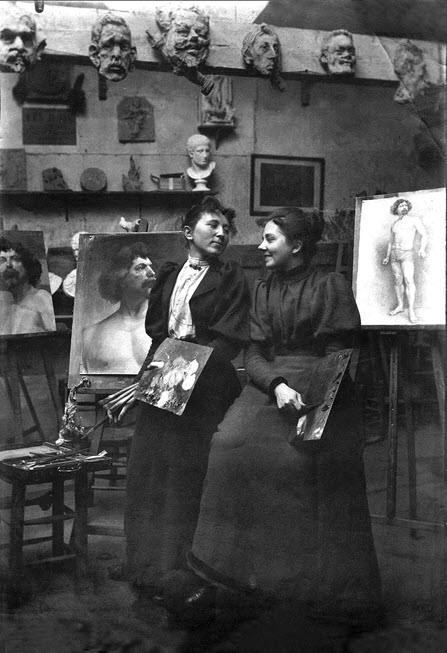
Alice Dannenberg (left) and Martha Stettler (right), 1894

Alice Dannenberg was born in Mitau, then part of the Russian Empire and now part of Latvia. By the end of the 19th century, she had moved to Paris, where she began exhibiting in 1901 with a group of Left Bank artists known as "Les Quelques" (The Few) that also included the Swiss painter Martha Stettler. A few years later, she had a hand in founding a new group of 50 artists known as "Tendences nouvelles" (New Trends); they held an exhibition in 1904. In 1908, Dannenberg rejoined The Few as a means of showing her work outside the major salons.

In 1902, Dannenberg and Stettler opened a new art school, Académie de la Grande Chaumière, with the aim of providing a form of art instruction different from the strict rules of painting taught in the École des Beaux-Arts. Dannenberg and Stettler served as directors of the school until 1945. An attraction of the Grande Chaumière was fees that were kept even lower than the rival Académie Julian. Among its teachers were Walter Sickert, Lucien Simon, Claudio Castelucho, and Antoine Bourdelle. Notable students include Louise Bourgeois, Alexander Calder, Isamu Noguchi, Alberto Giacometti, and Tamara de Lempicka.

In 1911, Dannenberg was elected to the National Society of Fine Arts. In 1927, she received her French naturalization papers, and not long afterwards she and Stettler moved to Fontenay-sous-Bois.

The last exhibition in which Dannenberg participated was in 1937. After the war, she and Stettler settled in Châtillon, where she died in 1948.

== Work ==
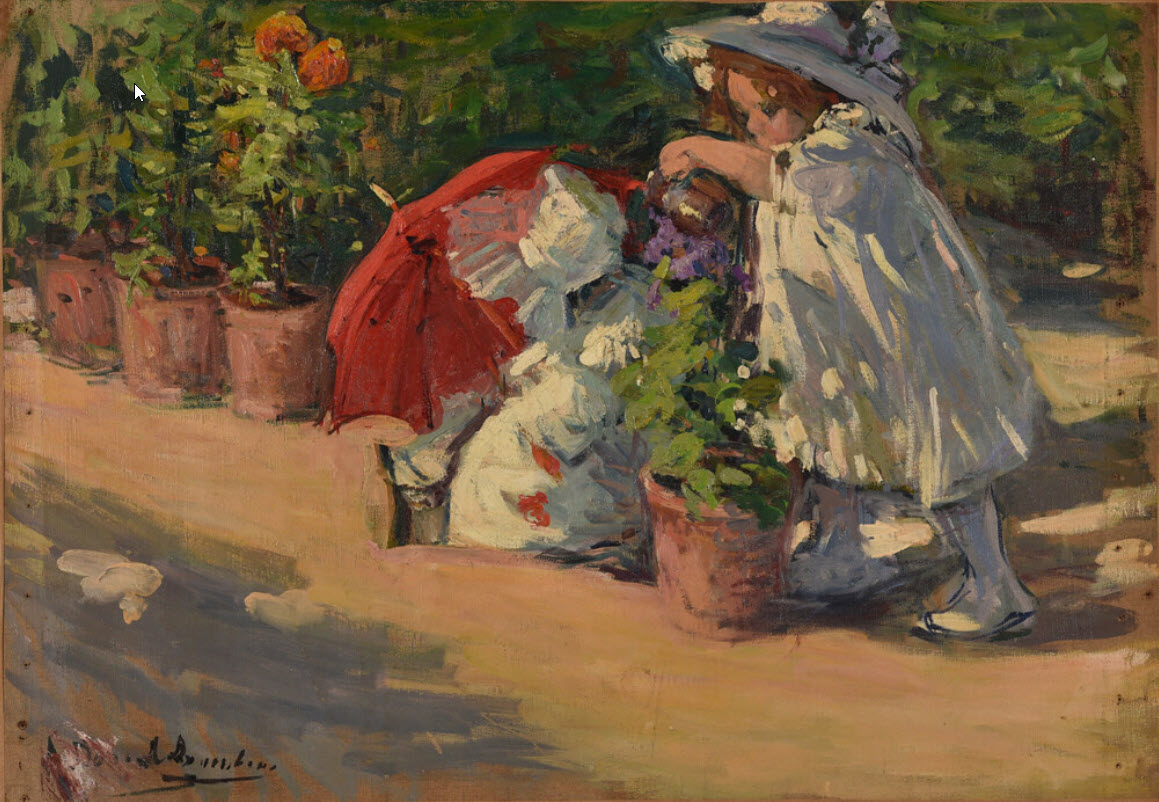
Deux fillettes et l'ombrelle rouge

When Dannenberg began exhibiting in 1901, she was already a mature artist who had been painting for over fifteen years. Her oldest known painting dates to 1884: it is a Russian landscape.

Between 1904 and about 1912, she painted mostly vivid, nostalgic scenes of Parisian children at play, particularly in the Luxembourg Gardens and the Tuileries Garden. Starting around 1908, she began to paint beach scenes and melancholy landscapes. In 1913 she painted a series of impressions of Italy including Venice and Florence. In 1914 she began a ten-year phase of painting interiors and still lifes. In the 1920s, she turned to expressive seascapes, and in the 1930s, she painted flowers. Critics have compared her Impressionist style to that of John Singer Sargent, Anders Zorn, and Charles Cottet.

Between 1904 and 1935, Dannenberg exhibited her landscapes and genre paintings frequently in the annual Salon d'Automne and Salon des Indépendants exhibitions as well as elsewhere.
