= Mary Remington =

British artist

- Born: 1910; Reigate, England
- Died: 2003 (aged 92–93); Carshalton, England
- Education: Redhill School of Art; Royal College of Art; Académie de la Grande Chaumière
- Known for: Painting

Mary Remington (1910–2003) was a British oil painter and artist. She exhibited her works at various prestigious venues, such as the Royal Academy of Arts and the New English Art Club. She was known for her landscapes, still lifes, and portraits.

== Biography ==
Remington was born at Reigate in Surrey and, after attending the Redhill School of Art, won a scholarship to the Royal College of Art in London. She studied at the Royal College from 1930 to 1933 before continuing her training in Paris at the Académie de la Grande Chaumière. Throughout her subsequent career, Remington exhibited oil paintings and other works at the Royal Academy in London, with the Royal Society of British Artists, the Royal Institute of Oil Painters and the New English Art Club, NEAC. Remington was elected a member of the NEAC in 1954 and of the Royal Institute of Oil Painters in 1962. She maintained a studio at Sutton in south London and died at Carshalton. Examples of her paintings are held by Brighton Museum & Art Gallery and in other public collections at Blackpool and at Kensington in London.
