= Paul Deltombe =

French painter and illustrator (1878–1971)

Paul Edmond Joseph Deltombe
- Born: 6 April 1878; Catillon-sur-Sambre, France
- Died: 8 August 1971 (aged 90); Nantes, France
- Known for: Painting

Paul Edmond Joseph Deltombe (born 6 April 1878 in Catillon-sur-Sambre, died 8 August 1971 in Nantes), was a French painter and illustrator.

== Biography ==
It seems that nothing predestined Paul Edmond Joseph Deltombe, born on 6 April 1878 into a family of bureaucrats, for a career as a painter. He had never even seen a painting, he claimed when he entered secondary school, the Lycée Saint-Dié (Vosges), at the age of fourteen. The young student, however, did display a precocious taste and talent for drawing. His friend and biographer Roger Vrinat recalled that he ‘skipped’ his school breaks to go off and draw, and that he assisted his drawing professor in correcting his schoolmates’ exercises.1 With his baccalauréat in hand, the budding artist nevertheless wanted to study philosophy, a discipline that was more apt to satisfy his intellectual inclinations. A pressing health problem, however, prevented him from attending university, and so he chose painting instead.

In 1896 Deltombe entered the École des Beaux-Arts de Lille, where he was accepted in the studio of Pharaon de Winter, who had trained several generations of artists from the city, including Médéric Bottin, one of Deltombe's first travelling companions. Following in his friend's footsteps, Deltombe entered the École des Beaux-Arts de Paris in 1900. He studied for a time under Léon Bonnat, and later Tony Robert-Fleury, before managing to get himself expelled from the institution. Punished because of his early penchant for Impressionist art, he took refuge in the Académie de la Grande Chaumière, founded in 1902. There he met Henri Matisse, who had joined the Grande Chaumière to study sculpture under the tutelage of Antoine Bourdelle. The friendship that grew between them no doubt owed something to their common roots in the north of France.

=== Meeting Signac ===
‘Rejected’ by the Salon des Artistes Français, just as Gustave Courbet and Claude Monet had been in their day, Deltombe exhibited for several years at the Société Nationale de Beaux-Arts, before finding in the galleries of the Salon des Indépendants both the venue and the works of painter-friends to which he would remain faithfully attached throughout his life. The artists included Matisse, with whom Deltombe renewed earlier ties, and above all Paul Signac, the founder of the Indépendants, who introduced the artist to the friends who had been with him from the start, including the Vice-President of the Salon, Maximilien Luce, with whom Deltombe shared a number of stylistic affinities. In Deltombe, Signac found an enthusiastic collaborator for organising the yearly Salon des Indépendants. Appointed Deputy Secretary (1909), Secretary (1912), and General Secretary (1914), President Signac, in a letter dated 2 March 1931, congratulates his faithful collaborator on being appointed to the rank of Honorary Vice-President.

=== Fauvist and Pointillist influences ===
From his very first appearance at the Salon des Indépendants, in 1902, Deltombe proved open to the latest trends in modern art. At that particular show, the famous collector Yvan Morozov bought one of his paintings. Deltombe rubbed shoulders with Matisse at the Académie de la Grande Chaumière, and through the older painter found himself in the thick of it when the Fauves created a stir at the 1905 Salon d’Automne, where he was also showing. They made a clear impact on Deltombe's contemporary still lifes. There he displays a genuine audacity in terms of colour. His Nature morte à l’aubergine, for example, probably would not look out of place in the ‘lions’ den’ of Fauvist artists. Against the picture's intense colours, he sets the restraint of the layout and the rigour of the composition. This way of constructing his works led one critic of the time to compare his still lifes to earlier ones by Paul Cézanne.

=== Tapestries studios ===
In 1912 Deltombe's marriage to a woman from Nantes drew him to the Loire estuary. The following year he painted the Portrait de Madame Paul Deltombe à Pornichet. Meanwhile, he spent a few months in Italy, where he discovered the old masters. A token of this voyage of discovery and rite of passage is his Nature Morte au Buste de Donatello, which remains a composition without equal in his career. He painted it in the homeland of the Florentine sculptor before his precipitous return to Nantes: he served for four years in the army's auxiliary services. Making the most of the situation, he and his wife founded three small tapestry studios to provide work for the wives of mobilised soldiers. Yvonne Deltombe taught her charges ‘point de Nantes’, or the Nantes stitch, an advanced technique for canvas which she invented and eventually patented after the war. Initially the only patterns she employed were the tapestry designs (cartoons) painted by her husband. The quality of her output, however, quickly drew commissions from other artists, and not insignificant ones, since major figures like Maurice Denis, Pierre Laprade, Félix Vallotton and Louis Valtat turned to the Deltombe studios a number of times to have their paintings transferred to a textile support. The Deltombes’ cartoons and tapestries were exhibited together several times at the Galerie Druet and the Galerie Georges Petit between 1917 and 1926.

=== Alongside the Loire ===
In 1921 the artist purchased La Marionnière, an estate in Champtoceaux on the banks of the Loire near Nantes. In this retreat in Maine-et-Loire, Deltombe isolated himself from the art scene in Paris. He embraced this life to get back in touch with the foundations of his vocation as a painter, which were built on a love of nature, as Vrinat reminds us in the opening pages of the monograph he devoted to the artist in 1965. During the two decades that followed, Deltombe painted the subtle bends of the Loire, the sunny verdant hillsides of Champtoceaux, and the neighbouring areas of Oudon, Drain and La Patache. The contact with the gentle beauty and life of the Anjou region caused Deltombe's style to evolve towards a subtler poetry which gradually shifted it away from the fullness and restraint of his landscapes depicting northern France.

=== South of France landscapes ===
In 1931 Deltombe was appointed Director of the École des Beaux-Arts de Nantes and would faithfully serve in that capacity until 1943. During his directorship, the artist, as a member of the city's Société des Amis du Musée des Beaux-Arts, helped to enrich the public collections with a number of important works by his chief friends, in particular Albert Marquet, Louis Valtat and Maurice Denis. These major 20th-century artists were also close to Yvonne Deltombe, who reproduced their work in her tapestries. From his home in the region of Nantes, Deltombe continued to submit paintings to the different Salons of the capital. Until 1959 he submitted colourful market scenes, and views of the lively fishing harbours located between Pornichet and Bourg-de-Batz. In the surrounding countryside, he painted churches and rectories of the Loire-Atlantique region, whose Gothic steeples stand out against the azure of the sky.

=== Deltombe's portraits ===
There is one important part of Deltombe's œuvre that remains to be discussed, namely his portraits and nudes. At his very first Salon des Indépendants, Deltombe submitted a Portrait d’homme. This was followed by many others. In this domain, his youthful masterpiece is probably the portrait of the artist Louise Hervieu, whom he painted with her two daughters in 1910 . In 1933 Deltombe added the landscape seen from the window, before exhibiting the reworked painting at the 1933 Salon des Indépendants. The fullness and softness of the brushstrokes in this group portrait recall Renoir's work; the picture offers a striking contrast with the Jeune homme au violoncelle, shown at the same salon three years earlier. This latter work, which wears its modernism on its sleeve, rivals a contemporary portrait by André Derain called Le noir à la mandoline, hanging in Paris’ Musée de l’Orangerie.

The life-size human figure also appears cyclically in Deltombe's landscapes in the idyllic form of pastorals. His nude or partly clad women, whether depicted full length or from the waist up, are shown bearing baskets of fruit or taking part in field work.

=== Towards posterity ===
A year before the artist's death in Nantes on 8 August 1971, the city's Musée des Beaux-Arts paid homage one last time to him by putting together a vast retrospective of his major works. And three years later the Parisian public had the chance to discover, or rediscover the artist, thanks to a retrospective mounted by the Galerie Yves Jaubert.

== Works in public institutions ==
- Entrée du château de Wargnies-le-Petit, 1908. Musée des Beaux-Arts, Nantes
- Wargnies, 1911. Musée des Beaux-Arts, Nantes
- Jeune homme au violoncelle, 1930. Musée des Beaux-Arts, Nantes

== Exhibitions ==
(non-exhaustive list)

- Paul Deltombe 1878-1971 - 1970, Musée des Beaux-Arts, Nantes
- Paul Deltombe 1878-1971 - April - May 1973, Musée Paul Valéry, Sète
- French Naturalist Painters 1890-1950 - 12 June - 7 July 2012, The Fleming Collection, London
