= Jeanne Socquet =

French painter and mosaicist (1928–2024)

- Born: 24 November 1928; Paris, France
- Died: 17 October 2024 (aged 95)
- Education: Académie de la Grande Chaumière; Beaux-Arts de Paris
- Occupation: Visual artist

Jeanne Socquet (24 November 1928 – 17 October 2024) was a French painter and mosaicist. She was a neo-expressionist who created a wide variety of mosaics.

== Biography ==
Born in Paris on 24 November 1928, Socquet was the oldest of four children. In 1945, she began an apprenticeship as a seamstress. At the age of 21, she left home and began her studies at the Académie de la Grande Chaumière and subsequently at the Beaux-Arts de Paris. In 1956, she married the architect Louis Seignon, who she met at the Beaux-Arts and had a son with him. However, she was forced to raise their son alone when Seignon was killed in a traffic collision in the 1960s. She then directed her art focus on marginalized people, such as those in psychiatric hospitals or those who did not conform to societal beauty standards. Her exhibition titles embraced these themes, with names such as Jeanne Socquet, peindre la solitude and La folie peinte par Jeanne Socquet.

In 1972, she joined a group of women activists, La Spirale, founded by Charlotte Calmis. The following year, she co-wrote a book titled La création étouffée with Suzanne Horer. The work acted as a feminist manifesto and a tribute to femininity in the realm of artwork. Throughout her career, her works were praised by the likes of Jacques Leenhardt, Marguerite Duras, and Armand Lanoux.

Socquet died on 17 October 2024, at the age of 95.

== Illustrated works ==
- New-York balafres (2005)

== Publications ==
- La création étouffée (1973)
- Son prochain comme soi-même (2014)
- Les Contes du Whisky délicieux sous la pluie (2015)
- L'enfance de Celestine (2016)
