= Arthur Aesbacher =

Swiss artist (1923–2020)

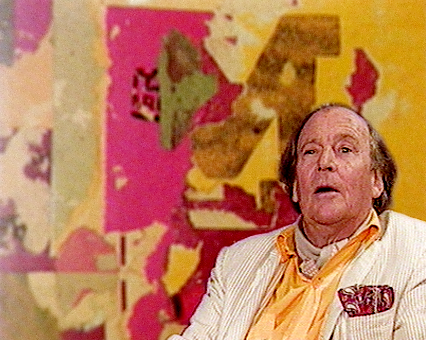
Arthur Aeschbacher (Still from a vidéo from the Encyclopédie audiovisuelle de l'art contemporain).

Arthur Aesbacher (1 April 1923 – 10 October 2020) was a Swiss artist.

Aesbacher was born in Geneva, Switzerland in April 1923. He studied in Paris at the Académie de la Grande Chaumière and at the Académie Julian, as a pupil of Fernand Léger. He worked primarily as a poster artist (French: affichiste) with torn posters, composed of various pictorial elements. He later worked in typography. Aesbacher died in Paris October 2020 at the age of 97.
