= Yolande Ardissone =

French painter

- Born: 6 June 1927; Bueil, Departement Eure, Normandy, France
- Died: 28 December 2024 (aged 97); Saint-Pierre-lès-Nemours, Departement Seine-et-Marne, Île-de-France, France
- Occupation: Painter

Yolande Ardissone (6 June 1927 - 28 December 2024) was a French painter. Born in Bueil (Normandy), she studied at the Beaux-Arts and at the Académie de la Grande Chaumière in Paris.She met Jaques Eitel - who was going to become her husband - during a trip in Italy in 1949. Yolande Ardissone and Jacques Eitel had a daughter, who also became a painter known under the name of Florence Arven. Yolande Ardissone exhibited her works in many salons, including the Salon des artistes français.

She was discovered by the art merchant Wally Findlay in 1957 and started exhibiting her works in New York City, Beverly Hills, Palm Beach and other US-based galleries that same year. Yolande Ardissone has gained a considerable reputation. Yolande Ardissone loves to paint Provence, Paris and the French countryside. But her favorite topic is the region of Brittany in western France.

== Exhibitions ==
- Galerie Framond, Paris, 1957, 1959, 1961 and 1966
- Galerie Moyon-Avenart, Nantes, 1970
- Galerie Makovski, Frankfurt, 1955
- Galerie Burrell, New York City, 1963
- Wally Findlay Gallery, New York City, 1966, 1968, 1975 and 1977
- Wally Findlay Gallery, Beverly Hills, 1976 and 1978
- Wally Findlay Gallery, Palm Beach, 1962 and 1978
- Wally Findlay Gallery, Chicago, 1962, 1971,1974, 1976, 1977 and 1978
- Wally Findlay Gallery, Paris, 1973 and 1975
- Galerie Artenoo, Paris, 2006 and 2007

== Salons ==
- Salon d'Automne
- Salon des Indépendants
- Salon des artistes français
- Salon de la Jeune Peinture
- Salon de la Société Nationale des Beaux-Arts
- Salon de la Marine
- Salon du dessin et de la peinture à l'eau
- Greenshields Prize

== Awards ==
- Salon des Artistes Francais, honorary mention, 1949
- Award of the City of Fontainebleau, 1967
- The City of Paris has awarded Yolande Ardissone the Medaille d'Argent.

== Notes and references ==
=== Bibliography ===
- Lydia Harambourg, Dictionnaire des peintres, Ides et Calendes, L'École de Paris (School of Paris) 1945-1965
- Akoun, 2004
- Ardissone, Terre des peintres Collection, 1988
- Bénézit Dictionary of Painters, Gründ, 1999
- Ardissone, Terre des Peintres Collection, 1988
- Ardissone, Arts Graphiques d'Aquitaine publishing, 1979
- L'Encyclopédie Poétique (the Poetry Encyclopedia), Jean Grassin Publishing
- La Jeune Peinture (the Young Painting School), collection Terre des Peintres
- Ardissone, Arts-Documents, Genève, 1969
- La famille autour du monde (the family around the world): Yolande Ardissone, Florence Arven, Jacques Eitel, Ariane Trip, by Ellen D. Strady, 50 pages, Terre des peintres Collection, 2000
- Collector's Guild (lithographies of the artist), New York
