= Magdalena Rădulescu =

Romanian painter (1902–1983)

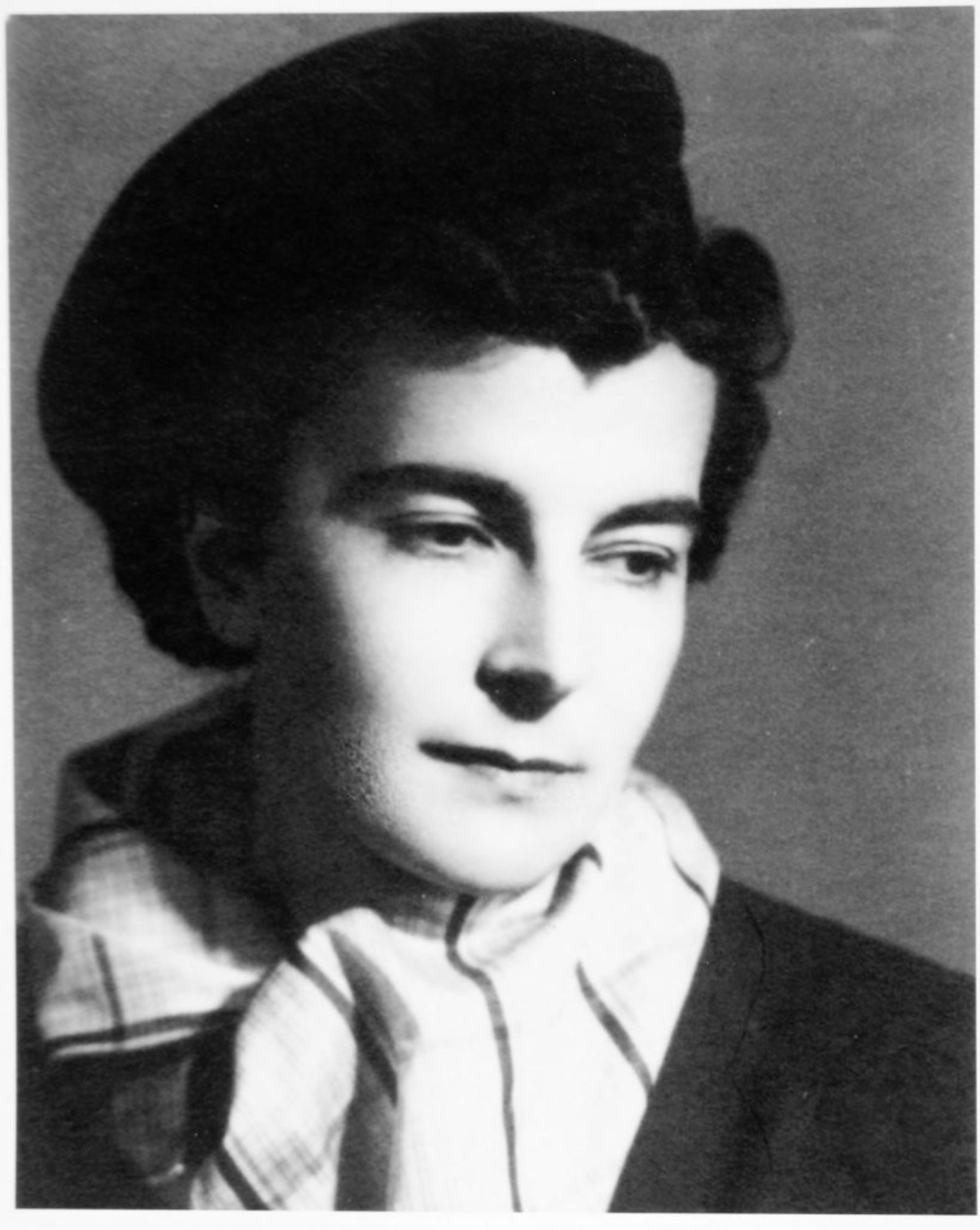
- Born: February 12, 1902; Râmnicu Vâlcea, Romania
- Died: March 4, 1983 (aged 81); Paris, France
- Other names: Dutza, Magdalena Radulescu, Magdalena Radulesco, Magdalena Radvlescu, Magdalena Campigli
- Education: Académie de la Grande Chaumière, Academy of Fine Arts, Munich
- Occupations: Painter, illustrator, printmaker
- Years active: 1924–1974
- Movement: Symbolism, expressionism
- Spouse: Massimo Campigli (m. 1927–1939; div.)

Magdalena Rădulescu (February 12, 1902 – March 4, 1983) was a Romanian modernist painter and illustrator. She was known for her symbolist and expressionist paintings, inspired by Romanian traditions and folklore. Rădulescu lived most of her life in France. She also used the names Magdalena Radulesco, and Dutza.

== Early life and education ==
Magdalena Rădulescu was born on February 12, 1902, in Râmnicu Vâlcea, and spent most of her childhood in Constanţa. Her father was an engineer and worked on the railroad, and her mother Natalia Herescu was a musician. Her brother Nicolae Rădulescu was also a musician in Bucharest. After World War I, the family moved to Bucharest.

She moved to Munich to study at the Academy of Fine Arts, Munich, and under painter Max Angerer (1877–1955); followed by study in Paris at the Académie de la Grande Chaumière, under Bernard Boutet de Monvel, Antoine Bourdelle, and René-Xavier Prinet.

She frequented the Montparnasse, and spent time with the other artists including Alberto Giacometti and Constantin Brâncuși. In 1925 she meets her future husband in Paris, the Italian painter Massimo Campigli, to whom she was married between 1927 and 1939 and ended in divorce. While they were married, the couple traveled throughout Europe and exhibited their work. During World War II, Rădulescu moved back to Romania where she remained until 1948.

Rădulescu's favorite subjects were mainly carnival figures, scenes with Romanian folk dances, weddings, and traditional cultural scenes. Her work is in museum collections, including at the National Museum of Art of Romania; and the Art Museum of Constanta in Constanţa.

Her last exhibition while she was alive was held in 1974, she stopped making work due to health issues. She died on March 4, 1983, in the 7th arrondissement of Paris.

== Exhibitions ==
=== Solo exhibitions ===
- 1994, Magdalena Radulescu, pictura si grafica (English: Painting and Graphics: Magdalena Rădulescu), solo retrospective, National Museum of Art of Romania, Bucharest, Romania
- 2007, Peintures de Magdalena Radulescu, Centre de Culture Européenne, Abbaye royale de Saint-Jean-d'Angély, Charente-Maritime, France
- 2022, Expoziție Magdalena Rădulescu, la 120 de la nașterea artistei (English: Magdalena Rădulescu Exhibition, 120 years after the artist's birth), Brașov Art Museum, Brașov, Romania

=== Group exhibitions ===
- 1924, Painting Salon, group exhibition, Bucharest, Romania
- 1928, Salon des Indépendants, group exhibition, Paris, France
- 2008, Sotto la cenere. Donne che lasciano il segno (English: Beneath the Ashes: Women Who Leave Their Mark), group exhibition, Palazzo Libera, Villa Lagarina, Trentino, Italy
- 2024, Sânii. O expoziție ca nimeni altul (English: Breasts. An Exhibition Like No Other), group exhibition, Dacia Palace, Bucharest, Romania
