= Lawrence Gipe =

American painter, independent curator, and educator

Lawrence Gipe (born 1962 in Baltimore, Maryland), is an American painter, independent curator, and Associate Professor of 2D studies at The University of Arizona, Tucson. He received a BFA from Virginia Commonwealth University (1984) and an MFA from the Otis/Parsons Institute of Art and Design, Los Angeles (1986). He maintains a studio practice in Los Angeles, splitting his time between California and Arizona.

Gipe's work utilizes “irredeemable” imagery sourced from an archive of business magazines (specifically, Fortune), propaganda tracts, social realism photography and other officially "sanctioned" artworks approved by politically-orientated bodies (such as the former Soviet Union, countries in the former Eastern Bloc, and China). His paintings translate small black and white images into large-scale works, saturated with color, in an ongoing series called The Century of Progress Museum. Severed from their original contexts, these reinterpretations encourage the viewer to reconstruct the original image's ideological landscape.

Artist and writer David Humphrey describes Gipe's practice thus, "The great mass of pictures left behind by history has become a kind of second nature for many contemporary artists. Lawrence Gipe has been an intrepid painter from this archive, selecting, representing, and recontextualizing second and third hand sources. With a keen eye for authoritarian rhetorics, Gipe refigures period photographs as paintings, while slyly balancing connoisseurship and interrogation.” In his review of Gipe's The Last Picture Show (1999) exhibition at Joseph Helman (New York), critic Donald Kuspit writes in Artforum, "By showing us the tricks of the painting and photography trades, by heightening his effects until they become vulgarly evident, Gipe suggests that art as such is a species of rhetoric, adding no substance to what it renders but only “orating” it in a convincing way." As an organizer of, and participant in, the group exhibition One Year: The Art of Politics in Los Angeles (2018) at Glendale’s Brand Library and Art Center, Los Angeles Times art critic Christopher Knight felt that the show had taken "the defensible position that on some level all art is political."

Gipe has received two NEA Individual Fellowship Grants (Painting, 1989 and Works on Paper, 1996). A mid-career survey, 3 Five-Year Plans: Lawrence Gipe, 1990-2005, was organized in 2006 by Marilyn Zeitlin at the ASU Art Museum, Tempe at Arizona State University. In 2001, Gipe was commissioned to create a mural for the lobby of the Federal Reserve Bank Headquarters in Atlanta, Georgia. In 2014, Gipe won a University of Arizona Confluencenter Faculty Collaboration and Innovation Grant for Documenting Operation Streamline: an ongoing drawing project, and published Operation Streamline: A Reader with funds from the grant (2015), combining his sketches from Federal Court with press clippings and original research from University of Arizona journalism students. These drawings have been used to illustrate articles and news features on Univision, Univision Nacional, PBS NewsHour, AZ Daily Star, Tucson Weekly, CBS News, Center for Latin American Studies, and Arizona Public Media. In 2019, Gipe participated in a residency at Tsinghua University in Beijing, China. As part of the residency, Gipe taught a two-week course, had an exhibition, and held a lecture. He gave students his perspectives about contemporary art, and emphasized the importance of conceptual development and social interaction between artists and the community.

Selected solo museum exhibitions include the Laguna Art Museum (Laguna Beach, CA), Amerika-Haus (Berlin), Worcester Art Museum, (Worcester, Massachusetts), Kunstverein für die Rheinlande und Westfalen (Düsseldorf), and The Chrysler Museum (Norfolk, VA). Permanent collections include The Brooklyn Museum, Los Angeles County Museum of Art (LACMA), San Jose Museum of Art, Santa Barbara Museum of Art, Yale University Library, Zimmerli Archive (Rutgers University, New Jersey), Boise Art Museum, Cincinnati Art Museum, The Ringling Museum, the Federal Reserve Board Fine Arts Program, and the Norton Museum of Art.

== Recent work ==
Gipe’s latest series, Russian Drone Paintings, employs the visual style of “Manifest Destiny” canvasses of the 19th Century. This directly references the Industrial Revolution: the historical origin, in his view, of our total ecological peril. Source images are derived from screenshots of drone footage posted on the now-censored RT news service run by the Russian government. These works address issues of hostile surveillance, climate change, and the Anthropocene. Seen through the lens of our global “adversary”, images of cities abandoned due to radioactivity, bombardment, and other traumatic events become representative of humanity’s relentless intrusion into nature. Selected works from this series feature prominently in Gipe's 2022 solo exhibition, Recent Pictures, at William Turner Gallery, Los Angeles.

== Selected solo exhibitions ==
- 1986 Karl Bornstein Gallery, Santa Monica, CA
- 1988 Laguna Art Museum, Laguna Beach, CA
- 1989 Galerie Six Friedrich, Munich, Germany
- 1989 America Haus, Berlin, Germany
- 1989 Hartje Galerie, Frankfurt, Germany
- 1990 Shea & Beker Gallery, New York, NY
- 1992 Blum Helman Gallery, New York, NY
- 1992 Galerie Six Friedrich, Munich, Germany
- 1992 Worcester Art Museum, Worcester, MA
- 1993 Blum Helman Warehouse, New York, NY
- 1993 Food House, Santa Monica, CA
- 1993 Modernism Gallery, San Francisco, CA
- 1993 Kunstverein für die Rheinlande und Westfalen, Düsseldorf, Germany
- 1994 Ruth Bloom Gallery, Santa Monica, CA
- 1994 The Chrysler Museum, Norfolk, VA
- 1996 Joseph Helman Gallery, New York, NY
- 1996 Kohn-Turner Gallery, Los Angeles, CA
- 1996 Quartet Editions, New York, NY
- 1996 Hunsaker Schlesinger Fine Art, Santa Monica, CA
- 1998 Joseph Helman Gallery, New York, NY
- 1998 Fay Gold Gallery, Atlanta, GA
- 1999 Joseph Helman Gallery, New York, NY
- 2001 Alan Koppel Gallery, Chicago, IL
- 2001 Joseph Helman Gallery, New York, NY
- 2006 Bentley Projects, Phoenix, AZ
- 2006 University Art Museum at Arizona State, Tempe, AZ (Mid-Career Survey)
- 2007 Alexander Gray Associates, New York, NY
- 2007 Byron Cohen Gallery, Kansas City, MO
- 2008 Randall Scott Gallery, Washington, DC
- 2010 Lora Schlesinger Gallery, Santa Monica, CA
- 2011 Tucson Museum of Art, Tucson, AZ
- 2012 Primary Projects, Miami, FL
- 2014 Galerie Michael Heufelder, Munich, Germany
- 2015 Lora Schlesinger Gallery, Santa Monica, CA
- 2018 Lora Schlesinger Gallery, Santa Monica, CA
- 2019 Tsinghua University Academy of Art and Design, Beijing, China
- 2021 Paul Mahder Gallery, Healdsburg, CA
- 2022 William Turner Gallery, Santa Monica, CA

== Permanent collections ==
- The Brooklyn Museum
- Los Angeles County Museum of Art
- San Jose Museum of Art
- Santa Barbara Museum of Art
- Yale University Library
- Boise Art Museum
- Cincinnati Art Museum
- Norton Museum of Art
- The Ringling Museum of Art
