= Pierre Henri Vaillant =

French painter

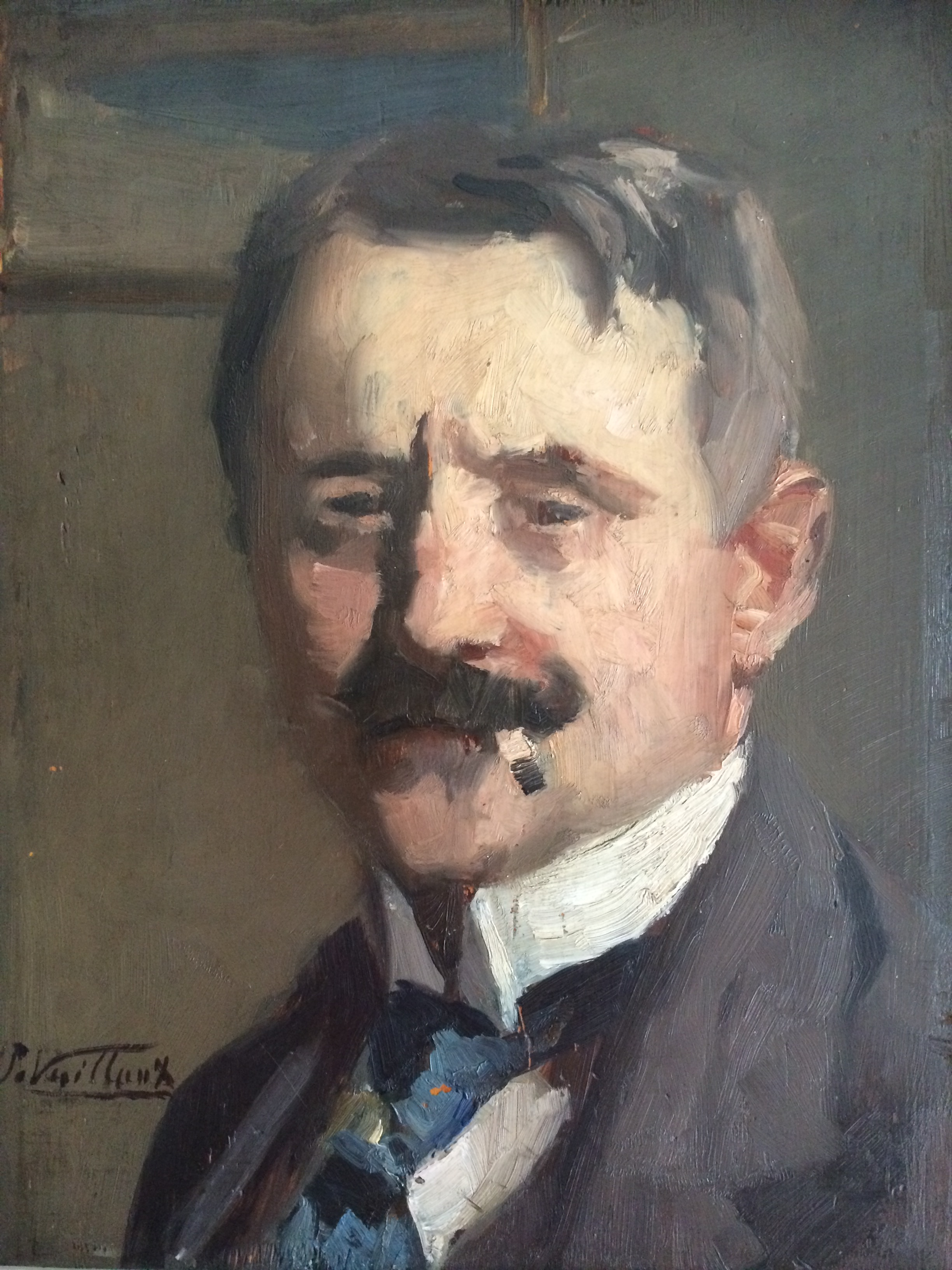
- Presumed self-portrait attributed to Pierre Vaillant. Unknown location, unsourced artwork.
- Born: Pierre Henri Vaillant; 30 January 1878; Paris
- Died: 8 May 1939 (aged 61); Chartres
- Occupation: Painter, printmaker

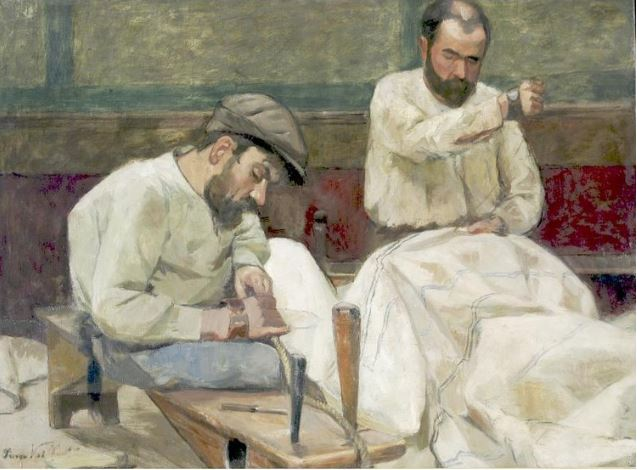
The Sailmakers

Pierre Henri Vaillant (30 January 1878, in Paris – 8 May 1939, in Chartres) was a French painter and engraver. He specialized in genre paintings and portraits.

== Biography ==
His father, Charles Émile Vaillant, was the Departmental Architect for Eure-et-Loir, and he spent most of his childhood in Chartres. He initially studied art at the École des beaux-arts de Paris, where his primary instructors were Jean-Léon Gérôme and Marcel Baschet. After leaving school, he began painting in Brittany, where he became friends with Charles Cottet, who had a significant influence on his style. His favorite place to paint was in Camaret-sur-Mer, and the Pardon Ceremony was one of his favorite subjects.

In 1905, he had his first solo exhibition at the Salon des artistes français, and was a frequent exhibitor there until 1914, when he was conscripted into the Army. Throughout his service, he continued to sketch and was part of several campaigns at the Western Front. During one of these, he was wounded in the forehead and gassed, which had a permanent effect on his health, limiting his ability to spend long periods painting on location. At the end of the war, he held the rank of Lieutenant and was awarded the Croix de Guerre. In 1919, he married Élisabeth Froc, and they had four children.

In 1921, he began exhibiting again, at the Société Nationale des Beaux-Arts. He soon became a member of the Société and, in 1930, was appointed to their governing committee, replacing Jean-Louis Forain, who had resigned. From 1923 to 1928, he created decorations for the Hôtel des Postes de Chartres. Those works, depicting daily life in Beauce, were destroyed during repairs and renovations in the 1970s.

He opened a workshop in Montparnasse, where he produced nudes and portraits. In 1930, he became a Professor at the Académie de la Grande Chaumière, replacing Lucien Simon. From that time on, he devoted himself almost entirely to educational activities. One of his most notable students was the Hungarian-Indian painter, Amrita Sher-Gil. He was named a Knight in the Legion of Honor in 1937.

In 2016, a major retrospective of his works was organized by his daughter, Dominique, and held in La Bazoche-Gouet.
