= Jacques Kupfermann =

American painter

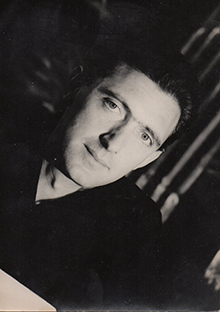
Jacques Kupfermann

Jacques Herbert Kupfermann (1926–1987) was an American Expressionist painter who was born in Vienna, Austria. His work, both abstract and figurative, divides into several distinct periods, reflecting both his early influences and later lengthy sojourns in countries as far apart as Mexico and Norway. Renowned for his portraits as well as landscapes, his subjects include many eminent figures. His distinctive use of impasto, the typically Expressionist love of the paint itself and rich earth colours, are perhaps some of the defining features of his work – as are his love of bleak Northerly scenery, the combination of delicacy and vibrant movement discernible in his still-life subjects, and an aura of tenderness and serenity even where a certain turbulence seems to lurk beneath the surface. Though he resisted making any obvious political or sociological statements in his work, it is not difficult to see how his early years in Vienna with all its uncertainty, daily threats and background violence, might have influenced his later paintings.

His talent was discernible at a very early age. It both provided some escape and release from what was going on all around him and literally acted as a lifeline, as it was his art teacher who helped him escape the country and the fate suffered by his parents. Elias and Mina (née Feuermann), who remained in Vienna, were later to be deported and killed in Minsk, Belarus. His father, Elias, had been a self-taught lawyer and inventor; his mother, Mina, a governess to a minor Austrian Royal. He had one sister, Frederika, who fled Vienna for Palestine, making her way via Scandinavia, in the early 1940s. The celebrated cellist Emanuel Feuermann was his mother's cousin.

== Early years ==
Though the family were far from wealthy, he grew up in a cultured household where poetry and art were encouraged. Jacques’ early childhood in Vienna had been filled with trips to the Natural History Museum, the Prater, and summer home in Poland, where he met relatives and went fishing a lot. His enduring love of mountain and woodland landscapes, seen in his work stemmed very much from those days. All this was to end with the Anschluss when he, as a Jew, was forced to leave school due to the rule of Hitler and the NSDAP. He oftentimes witnessed and endured acts of brutality that were committed daily against him, as well as other Jewish folks in Germany at that time.

Kupfermann was born to Jewish parents who had migrated from an area of Austria-Hungary that had become part of Poland. Because he was born in Austria he was able to get a visa to the US, but his parents were not. Him getting a visa at all came to be because his art teacher valued his artistic ability and wanted to help him escape from the Nazi regime.

Jacques finally managed to leave Vienna as a 13-year-old in April of 1940. He went alone by train, crossing many occupied countries in Europe to get to Netherlands where he boarded the SS Volendam to the United States. The Netherlands were invaded by Germany only about a month after Jacques arrived, yet he still managed to board the ship before Rotterdam was bombed.

However arriving in the US, he still faced hardship. Being a refugee and not speaking much English at the time, he arrived carrying a letter from his parents. He would keep it as a memento for the rest of his life. In said letter, his parents begged for Jacques to try and send them a few hundred dollars, helping them leave Nazi occupied Austria. Still being quite young, a refugee and by that rather unwelcome in America, Jacques was unable to raise the amount, his parents were asking for. Even though it was out of his hands and may not have even gotten them out of Austria, Jacques blamed himself the rest of his life for, as he thought, letting down his parents. Furthermore, he wasn’t treated well by the family members that took him in, with them making no secret of the fact they saw him as a burden.

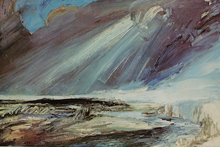
River View 1974 Oil on Canvas

Unsurprisingly, with his parents having been deported, or possibly worse, his teen years in the Bronx, NY were troubled, with Jacques being sent to a corrective facility in Engelwood, New Jersey after committing a minor misdemeanour. Dr Abe Kraig, who ran the facility at the time encouraged him to apply for a scholarship to The High School of Music & Art in New York.

Even though Jacques was awarded said scholarship, he had another career path in mind at the time; he wanted to volunteer as a G.I. and fight – and above all return to Vienna to look for his parents. At the end of the war he was deployed as a paratrooper to Northern Italy. Having spent one year in Italy, he finally returned to Vienna when the war was over, where he discovered that neighbours had denounced his parents and that they had then been rounded up and deported to the East. Shocked by the decision his parents former neighbours made, Jacques vowed to never return to his former home in Vienna and never did.

Returning to the States, Jacques studied at the Art Students League of New York with Yasuo Kuniyoshi, whose colour theories exerted an important influence on his later style. In the late 1940s, he briefly joined his sister in newly established Israel working for the IDF, helping to build the town of Eilat. There followed a somewhat restless period where he travelled extensively, in-between studying at the Académie de la Grande Chaumière, Paris and State Academy, Norway. He famously made one trip round Europe on a motorbike with a little sidecar attached for his beloved basset-beagle hound, Sam. He lived and painted in Mexico for a few years, and lived for a few years in Norway whose glacial and brooding scenery helped establish his unique style and palette. He was to develop the same sort of relationship with the harsh landscapes of Maine, where he would retreat for a few months to a remote hunting camp every year as a woodland guide.

== Marriage, Woodstock and England ==
Jacques married Jeannette (née Weitz), an English anthropologist and writer, in 1964. They met in New York on a blind date set up by the cartoonist Robert Grossman and his wife Donna. At that time, Jeannette was working as research librarian for the Wenner-Gren Foundation for Anthropological Research, while studying at Columbia University for her master's degree. It was love at first sight with Jacques proposing on their second date and Jeannette accepting. They married a few months later in London. On their return to the States they moved to Woodstock, New York – then a renowned artist's colony – and their son Elias was born in nearby Kingston in 1965.

For a while they kept homes in both Woodstock and London, where their second child Mina was born (1967), but finally settled in England in 1970, moving from London to a large Regency house in Maidenhead where Jacques had his studio.

In 1974 Jacques held his first one-man exhibition in the UK at the Thackeray Gallery, Kensington and he continued to exhibit in the US mainly in New Orleans, Princeton and Woodstock, drawing much inspiration from the North Cornish coastline. In 1972 the couple bought a small fisherman's cottage in Port Isaac as a holiday home and base for Jacques’ painting.

As well as his affinity to Cornwall, Jacques also described to have affection for the Thames valley, riverside vistas and his own garden, full of foliage, giant poppies and wild marguerites.

By the time Jacques became ill in the 1980s, he had also built up a solid reputation as a portrait painter with his portraits exhibiting many of the same distinct characteristics as his landscapes.

He had also, in the 1950s, designed ballet sets for the Princeton ballet – notably for Coppélia and Under Milk Wood, though only a few photographs survive of these. He later formed a close friendship with the ballet designer Nicholas Georgiadis in the 1970s.

As a member of the Chelsea Arts Club, he would spend much time meeting friends there towards the end of his life.

== The paintings ==
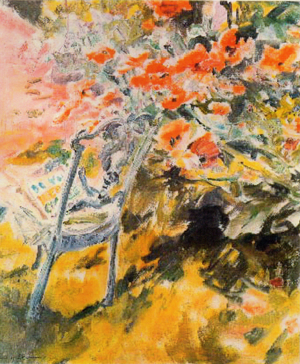
Poppies by Chair 1987 Oil on Canvas

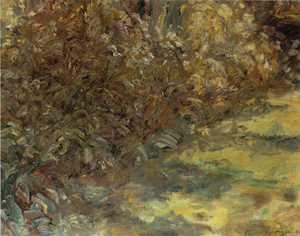
Garden Corner 1982 Oil on Canvas

OFFICIAL PURCHASES AND PUBLIC COLLECTIONS:

- Museum of Modern Art. U.S.A.
- Columbus Museum, U.S.A.
- Montclair Museum, U.S.A.
- Kalamazoo Art Institute U.S.A.
- Newark Museum, U.S.A.
- Pennsylvania Academy, U.S.A.
- Academy of Norway

ONE-MAN EXHIBITIONS:

- Jacques Seligmann Gallery, New York, 1965
- Little Gallery, Princeton, 1954/56/58
- Munson Gallery, New Haven 1963/67
- Kalamazoo Museum 1958
- Z.O.A House, Tel-Aviv 1960
- Woodstock Gallery, New York, 1966
- Downtown Gallery, New Orleans, 1961/64/73
- Gallery 100, Princeton 1972/75
- Gallery Vincitore, Brighton 1973
- Brunel University 1977
- Thackeray Gallery, London 1974/76/78/82/84/86
- Mall Galleries London: Royal Society of Portrait Painters, 1984/86
- Galerie Richard, Kusnacht, Switzerland, 1987
