= Olivia Mary Bryden =

British artist

- Born: 1883; Tunbridge Wells, England
- Died: 1951 (aged 67–68)
- Education: Académie de la Grande Chaumière; Academie Colarossi; Central School of Art
- Known for: Painting

Olivia Mary Bryden (1883–1951) was a British portrait painter and decorative artist.

== Biography ==
Bryden grew up in Tunbridge Wells and attended West Hill School in Eastbourne before training as an artist in Paris. She studied at the Académie de la Grande Chaumière and the Academie Colarossi under Lucien Simon and Charles Cottet. Returning to England, Bryden studied at the Central School of Arts and Crafts in London where she received her teacher training certificate and was awarded a prize by the Royal Drawing Society. Producing portraits and decorative pieces, Bryden became a regular exhibitor at London galleries. She showed works at the Grosvenor Galleries, at Burlington House, with the Fine Art Society and the Royal Society of British Artists and, between 1922 and 1933, with the Society of Women Artists. A number of churches acquired decorative pieces by Bryden. She produced a panel for the altar of a church in Brede in Sussex and a triptych for a church in Highgate, near her Hampstead home.

Bryden's 1935 portrait of Frederick Courtney Selous is in the collection of the National Portrait Gallery in London. The Imperial War Museum also holds a portrait of Selous by Bryden.
