= Fred Klein =

French painter

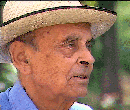
- Klein in 1988
- Born: Friedrich Franz Albert Klein; 8 April 1898; Bandung, Dutch East Indies
- Died: 25 April 1990 (aged 92); 16th arrondissement of Paris, France
- Other name: Frits Klein
- Spouse(s): Marie Raymond (m. 1926; div. 1961) Ursula Bardsley
- Children: Yves Klein

Friedrich Franz Albert Klein (8 April 1898 – 25 April 1990), known as Fred Klein, was a Dutch painter who spent much of his life in France.

== Biography ==
Klein was born on 8 April 1898 in Bandung, Dutch East Indies (present-day, Indonesia). In 1903, aged 5, Klein's family moved to the Netherlands.

He lived and worked in France beginning in 1920. His style was somewhat akin to Impressionism. A figurative painter of landscapes, he had exhibitions starting in 1930. He is known for his frequent depiction of horses and dreamy beach scenes. Dutch critics admired his work as did French ones, who often compared him to Odilon Redon. "[Klein] starts from a dream of colors from which the motif gradually takes shape. Notwithstanding he still reverts to reality with this, albeit a dreamed up reality," one review concluded.

Klein's work was included in the 1939 exhibition and sale Onze Kunst van Heden (Our Art of Today) at the Rijksmuseum in Amsterdam.

On his 80th birthday, the Van Gogh Museum in Amsterdam held a retrospective of his work. In recent years, there has been renewed interest in his paintings, leading to a spike in prices.

== Personal life ==
In 1926, Klein married the French painter Marie Raymond before later divorcing in 1961. Klein and Raymond had one son, the painter Yves Klein.

Klein later married the British painter Ursula Bardsley.
