= Bernadette Kanter =

French sculptor

Bernadette Kanter is a French sculptor born in Saint-Étienne-du-Rouvray (Normandy) in 1950, her preferred material is bronze.

== Biography ==
In 1974, after studying at the College of artistic careers of Paris (ICART), at the École nationale supérieure des Beaux-Arts in Paris, and the Académie de la Grande Chaumière in Montparnasse in Paris, Kanter established her studio in Buchelay, near Paris. In addition she continued to study gemology and gained work experience in workshops of sculpture, sculpting, molding, casting and direct carving.

In 2002 Kanter created Dogs of the bridge guard at Mantes-la-Jolie, near Paris, which consists of two bronze sculptures guarding the entrance to the city after the bridge Peronnet. In 2004 she created an aircraft-bird figure for Aérospatiale, Nungesser and Colis.

== Works ==
- 1990 The music museum Neunkirchen, (Germany)
- 1991 Order and force Ministry of Interior, mural for the hall of the police station at Nogent-sur-Marne
- 1993 The Rooster Urban District of Mantes-la-Jolie
- 1994 Cockfight Buchelay
- 1998 The large eagle Buchelay
- 1998 City Council signalitiques Buchelay, seven terracotta panels for la Maison pour tous
- 1998 Fontaine fishermen Belgium
- 2000 Big horse Vésinet
- 2002 The Bridge guard dogs Mantes-la-Jolie
- 2004 Nungesser and Colis Aérospatiale
- 2007 Fresco Shut' Fat (North-East of Jerusalem) Limay Town Hall

== Awards ==
- 1988 Second Grand-Prix at the International Biennial of Quebec (Canada)
- 1995 Gold Medal at the National exhibition of wildlife artists
- 1999 Silver Medal of the Academy of Arts Sciences and Letters in Paris
- 2001 Gold Medal for Sculpture French artists Sociétaires Taylor Foundation
