= Michel Thompson =

French painter (1921–2007)

Michel Thompson (1921–2007) was a French painter.

== Public collections ==
- Blois Museum: Interior scene, oil on canvas, 1949;
- Musée d'art Roger-Quilliot, Clermont-Ferrand: Woman at her toilette, oil on canvas, 1951;
- Musée d'Art Moderne de Paris: Still life with saucepan, oil on canvas, 1960;
- Musée d'art et d'histoire de Saint-Denis: The train, oil on canvas, 1956;
- Villeneuve-sur-Lot Museum: Portrait of Claudine with oranges, oil on canvas, 1949.

== Bibliography ==
- Michel Thompson, preface by Georges-Emmanuel Clancier, Artko Gallery, Toulouse, 1988.
- Lydia Harambourg, “Michel Thompson”, in The School of Paris, 1945-1965, Éditions Ides et Calendes, Neuchâtel, 1993.
- Caroline Benzaria, Michel Thompson, preface by Edgar Morin, Éditions Altamira, Paris, 2006.
