= Jean Piaubert =

French painter

Jean Piaubert (27 January 1900 – 28 January 2002) was a French painter.
