= Christine Boumeester =

Dutch-French painter (1904–1971)

Christine Boumeester (1904–1971) was a Dutch-French abstract and surrealist painter.

== Biography ==
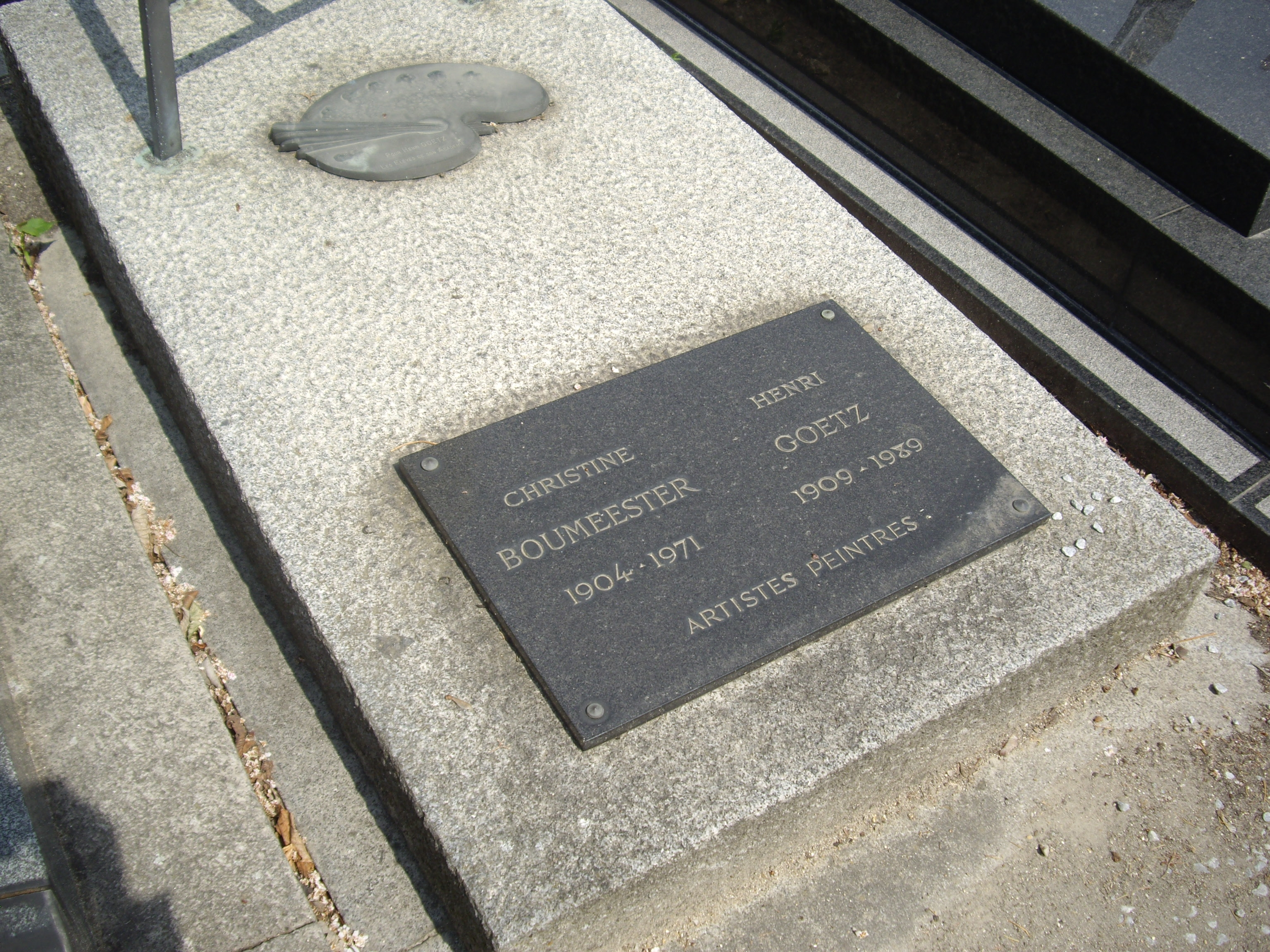
Boumeester and Goetz's grave in Paris

Boumeester was born in Batavia, then the capital of Dutch colonial Indonesia. Relocating to Europe as a young adult, Boumeester studied at École des Beaux Arts at the Hague from 1922 to 1924. In 1935, she moved to Paris and enrolled at Académie de la Grande Chaumière. It was there that Boumeester met and soon married the painter Henri Goetz.

Boumeester's first solo exhibition in France took place at the Galerie Bonaparte. Her work was often exhibited in group shows alongside artists like Hans Hartung, Kandinsky, and Viera da Silva. Boumeester and Goetz relocated to Nice at the start of World War II, where they were both active in the Resistance, helping create forged papers. The couple's close association with the artist community continued, including collaboration with Raoul Ubac and Christian Dotremont. During the war Boumeester also began a close friendship with the painter Francis Picabia; she would later restore his famous work Udnie.

Boumeester and Goetz returned to Paris in 1945. Boumeester was the subject of a short film by Alain Resnais in 1946 that documented her creation of a painting. She was naturalized as French citizen in 1949 along with her husband. In 1962, Boumeester translated Kandinsky's book Point and Line to Plane into French.

Boumeester died in 1971 in Paris. Her husband published her notebooks Le Cahier de Christine Boumeester in 1977. In 1983, the museum Musée Goetz-Boumeester opened in Villefranche-sur-Mer, dedicated to Boumeester and her husband's work.

== Literature ==
- Goetz, Henri. Christine Boumeester. Introduction de Vercors. [Paris]. Maeght, 1968.
- Sireuil, Jean. Christine Boumeester. Preface de Henri Goetz. Paris, Editions Cercle d'art, 1988.
