= Jean Aujame =

French painter (1905-1965)

Pierre François Claude Jean Aujame (May 12, 1905 – July 5, 1965), known professionally as Jean Aujame, was a French painter.

Jean Aujame was born on May 12, 1905, in Aubusson in Creuse. In 1923, he created the Society of Norman Artists. He did his military service in Algeria between 1927 and 1929, then moved to Paris in 1930. He made many exhibitions and traveled to the Netherlands, Spain and Portugal.

Jean Aujame lived in Sauvagnat-Sainte-Marthe in Auvergne from 1949 to 1965. He was buried in Sauvagnat.

His works are preserved, among others, at the Museum of Modern Art in the city of Paris, in the museums of Albi, Grenoble and Guéret.
