= Socrate Sidiropoulos =

Greek painter and sculptor

Socrate Sidiropoulos (born 1947 in Attica, Greece), is a Greek painter and sculptor.

== Biography ==
His mother, a painter of orthodox icons, taught him the art of drawing, iconography, frescos, and mosaics.

He was disciple of the sculptor Ossip Zadkine. He continued to study the sculpture by the sculptor Costas Valsamis. He learned Western painting from the painters Zoe Valsamis and Philopoemen Constantinidi. He completed his studies at the Academie de la Grande Chaumière in Paris.

He is influenced by the painters Goya, Zurbarán, and Caravaggio. He has painted religious scenes with occidental art. He has painted icons for Gregorian and Julian orthodox churches. He has painted many scenes of Flamenco and bullfighting. He has painted portraits of the matador Manolete, Nimeño II, Paquirri, and others.

== Selected works ==
- The Artist and his Room (painting), Museum of Elsene, Bruxelles, Belgium
- Oriental Portrait (painting), Göteborgs Konstmuseum, Göteborgs, Sweden
- Manolete (painting), Museo de Arte de El Salvador
- Suleiman the Magnificent (painting), The Pushkin State Museum of Fine Arts of Moscow, Russia
- La Vuelta (Nimeno II) (painting), Nouveau Musée National de Monaco, Les Villas des Pins, Monaco

== Bibliography ==
- Martine Brimault, Peintres de Portraits à Paris de 1764 à 2014, Erato 2014, ISBN 978-2-9547947-0-9, page 131, 132, 133, 134, BNF Bibliothèque Nationale de France, Paris, France. BNF Catalogue Général
- Martine Brimault, Sotiris René Sidiropoulos, Peintre Sculpteur, monographie de l'artiste, Erato 2014, ISBN 978-2-9547947-1-6, page 76, 77, 78, 79, BNF Bibliothèque Nationale de France, Paris, France. BNF Catalogue Général
