= Michael Frary =

American artist

Michael Frary (May 28, 1918 – August 30, 2005) was an American Modernist artist from Santa Monica, California, who was known for his interest in structural forms and architectural compositions, as well as for his Surrealist impulses. A versatile artist, Frary experimented with a range of mediums and constantly refined his approach to his subjects.

== Early life and career ==
Frary graduated from Palm Beach High School in 1934 and was awarded an athletic scholarship from the University of Southern California (USC). During his time at USC, he became a champion swimmer and captain of the school's water polo team. In 1940, he graduated with a Bachelor of Architecture Degree. He obtained his Master of Fine Arts degree in painting the following year. At the outbreak of the Second World War, Frary joined the United States Navy. He was discharged as a Lieutenant when the war concluded in 1945 and returned to California. Frary subsequently worked as an assistant art director for Goldwyn Studios, Paramount, and Universal Studios. As a member of the Society of Motion Picture Art Directors from 1946 to 1949, Frary assisted with the design of backdrops for films directed by Hollywood luminaries like Orson Welles. He began to teach night classes in painting at the University of California, Los Angeles (UCLA) and was soon offered a full-time teaching position at the school. While teaching at UCLA, Frary also taught at Los Angeles City College and the Chouinard Art Institute.

== Texas Modernist Period ==
In 1949, Michael relocated from California to Texas, after accepting the position of faculty chair at the McNay Art Museum in San Antonio. In addition to his teaching responsibilities, Frary continued his studies, taking classes at the Chicago Art Institute and at L' Académie de La Chaudière in Paris. These experiences gave him an appreciation for the forward-thinking work being produced by the European and American Modernists. Frary taught at the McNay Museum until 1952 and, while there, met Lola Marguerite Finch Mathewson "Peggy" Frary, whom he married in 1950.

When Frary was offered an assistant professor position at the University of Texas at Austin, he and his wife moved to a contemporary house in the northwest hills of Austin. They would remain there for the next five decades. Peggy Frary, who had a flair for entertaining, turned the home into a gathering place for Austin's burgeoning arts community. Frary was named professor of Art in 1970 and, upon his retirement in 1986, was named Professor Emeritus of Art.

Frary's legacy as a seminal Texas Modernist rests of his achievements during his early years at the University of Texas, when he worked alongside notables like Charles Umlauf, Everett Spruce, Ralph White, Kelly Fearing, William Lester, and Loren Mozley to promote Modernism in Texas. Frary and his compatriots helped usher Texas out of its artistic conservatism and into the national and international mainstream.

Frary continued to paint and exhibit his work until his death in 2005.

== Select solo exhibitions ==
During his career Frary received over one hundred seventy-five awards and purchase prizes and participated in over 200 one-man exhibitions.

1954

- Dalzell Hatfield Galleries, Los Angeles, California
- Betty McLean Gallery, Dallas, Texas
- Pan-American Galleries, San Antonio, Texas

1955

- Laguna Gloria Art Museum, Austin, Texas

1956

- Dalzell Hatfield Galleries, Los Angeles, Texas
- Fine Arts Department, San Antonio, Texas

1957

- Incarnate Word College, San Antonio, Texas
- Petite Gallery, New York, New York

1958

- Valley House Gallery, Dallas, Texas

1959

- Gallery of Modern Art, Fort Worth, Texas
- Laguna Gloria Art Museum, Austin, Texas
- Gallery of Modern Art, Fort Worth, Texas

1960

- Junior League Gallery, Houston, Texas
- Dalzell Hatfield Galleries, Los Angeles, California
- Janet Nessler Gallery, New York, New York
- Springfield Museum of Art, Springfield, Missouri

1961

- Art Department Gallery, San Angelo

College, San Angelo, Texas 1962

- McNay Art Institute, San Antonio, Texas
- Marion Koogler McNay Art Institute, San Antonio, Texas

1963

- Hill Country Arts Foundation, Ingram, Texas
- Peabody Museum, Salem, Massachusetts

1964

- Gallery of the Four Columns, Little Rock, Texas
- The Street Gallery, Little Rock, Arkansas
- Norton Gallery, St. Louis, Missouri
- Sul Ross State College Fine Arts Gallery, Alpine, Texas
- San Angelo College, San Angelo, Texas

1965

- Shook Carrington Gallery, San Antonio, Texas

1966

- Valley House Gallery, Dallas, Texas
- Dalzell Hatfield Galleries, Los Angeles, California

1967

- Artists West of the Mississippi Exhibition, Colorado Springs Fine Arts Center, Colorado Springs, Colorado
- Missouri Southern University Art Department, Joplin, Missouri

1968

- Concordia College, Austin, Texas
- Valley House Gallery, Dallas, Texas
- Shook Carrington Gallery, San Antonio, Texas
- Frary-Lester Show at University Art Museum, University of Texas at Austin

1970

- Main Place Gallery, One Main Place, Dallas, Texas
- Parkcrest Gallery, 5408 Parkcrest, Austin, Texas
- TFAA traveling Michael Frary Exhibition: Sul Ross State College, Alpine, Texas; the University of Texas at El Paso, El Paso, TX; Odessa College, Odessa, Texas; Angelina College, Lufkin, Texas; Kilgore College, Kilgore, Texas; McAllen State Bank Patrons of Art, McAllen, Texas; Guadalajara, Mexico

1971

- University of Texas at El Paso, El Paso, Texas
- Odessa College, Odessa, Texas
- Sul Ross State University, Alpine, Texas
- Parkcrest Gallery, Austin, Texas

1973

- Laguna Gloria Art Museum, Austin, Texas
- Meredith Long Gallery, Houston, Texas
- Marion Koogler McNay Art Institute, San Antonio, Texas
- Dallas Public Library, Dallas, Texas

1975

- University of Texas at Dallas, Dallas, Texas
- Texas Lutheran College, Seguin, Texas

1977

- Abilene Fine Arts Museum, Abilene, Texas

1979

- Galveston Art Center on the Strand, Galveston, Texas

1984

- Santa Fe East, Santa Fe, New Mexico

== Select museums and public collections ==
- Los Angeles County Museum, Exposition Park, Los Angeles, California.
- Smithsonian Institution, Washington, D.C.
- Butler Institute of American Art, Youngstown, Ohio.
- Santa Barbara Museum of Art, Santa Barbara, California.
- Witte Memorial Museum, San Antonio, Texas
- Laguna Gloria Art Museum, Austin, Texas
- Dallas Museum of Fine Arts, Dallas, Texas
- Museum of Fine Arts of Houston, Texas
- Springfield Art Museum, Springfield, Missouri
- Janet Nessler Gallery, New York, New York
- Knoedler Gallery, New York, New York
- Black Tulip Gallery, Dallas, Texas
- Valley House Gallery, Dallas, Texas
- The University of Texas Student Union, Austin, Texas
- Beverly Fairfax Community Center, Los Angeles, California
- Meadows Building, Dallas, Texas
- D. D. Feldman Collection, Dallas, Texas
- Ted Weiner Collection, Fort Worth, Texas
- Coca-Cola Company, New York, New York
- Grumbacher Collection, New York, New York
- Bocour Collection, New York, New York
- Virginia Museum of Fine Arts, Richmond, Virginia
- Phillips Petroleum Company, Bartlesville, Oklahoma
- Dallas Morning News, Dallas, Texas
- National Gallery of Art, Washington, D.C.
- One Rockefeller Plaza, New York, New York
- State University of New York at Binghamton, Binghamton, New York
- Bureau of Reclamation, Washington, D.C.
