= The Kreutzer Sonata =

1889 novella by Leo Tolstoy

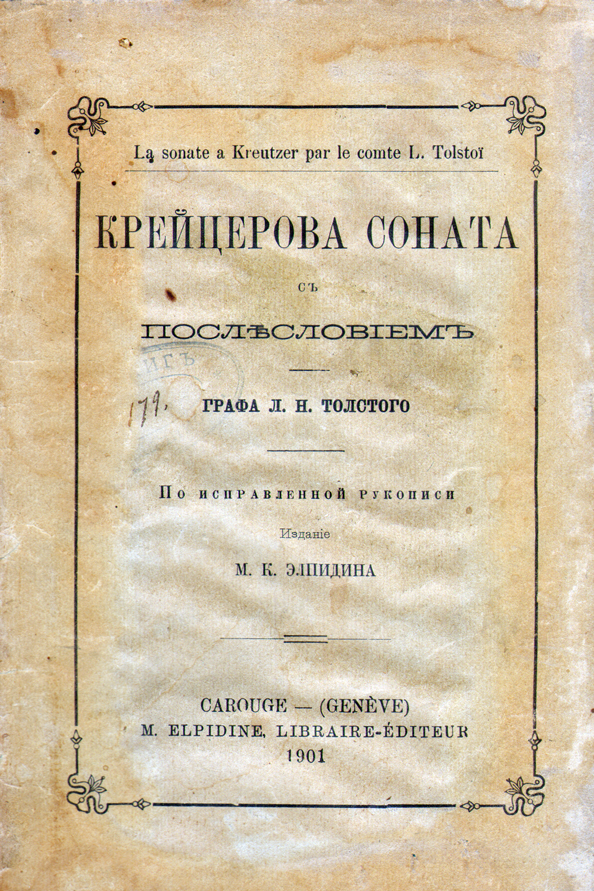
- Title page of the 1901 Geneve edition in Russian
- Author: Leo Tolstoy
- Original title: Крейцерова соната
- Translator: Frederic Lyster (1890); David McDuff & Paul Foote (2008)
- Language: Russian
- Genre: Philosophical fiction
- Publisher: Bibliographic Office, Berlin
- Publication date: 1889
- Publication place: Russian Empire
- Pages: 118 (Pollard's 1890 English edition)
- ISBN: 978-0-14-044960-0
- Dewey Decimal: 891.733
- LC Class: PG3366 .K7
- Original text: Крейцерова соната at Russian Wikisource
- Translation: The Kreutzer Sonata at Wikisource

The Kreutzer Sonata (Russian: Крейцерова соната, Kreitzerova Sonata) is a novella by Leo Tolstoy, named after Beethoven's Kreutzer Sonata. The novella was published in 1889, and was promptly censored by the Russian authorities. The work is an argument for the ideal of sexual abstinence and an in-depth first-person description of jealous rage. The main character, Pozdnyshev, relates the events leading up to his killing of his wife: in his analysis, the root causes for the deed were the "animal excesses" and "swinish connection" governing the relation between the sexes.

== Summary ==
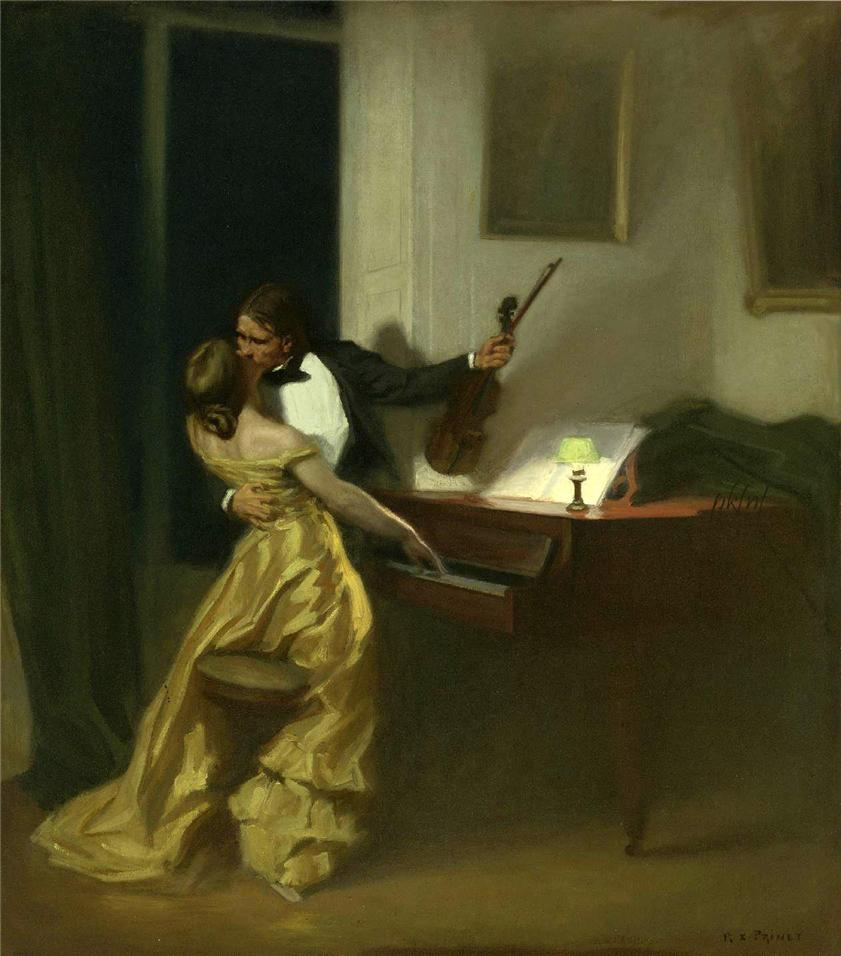
Tolstoy's novella inspired the 1901 painting The Kreutzer Sonata by René-Xavier Prinet.

During a train ride, Pozdnyshev overhears a conversation concerning marriage, divorce and love. When a woman argues that marriage should not be arranged but based on true love, he asks "what is love?" and points out that, if understood as an exclusive preference for one person, it often passes quickly. Convention dictates that two married people stay together, and initial love can quickly turn into hatred. He then relates how he used to visit prostitutes when he was young, and complains that women's dresses are designed to arouse men's desires. He further states that women will never enjoy equal rights to men as long as men view them as objects of desire, yet describes their situation as a form of power over men, mentioning how much of society is geared towards their pleasure and well-being and how much sway they have over men's actions.

Pozdnyshev relates that after he met and married his wife, periods of passionate love and vicious fights alternated. She bore him five children, and then received contraceptives: "The last excuse for our swinish life – children – was then taken away, and life became viler than ever." His wife takes a liking to a violinist, Troukhatchevsky, and the two perform Beethoven's Kreutzer Sonata (Sonata No. 9 in A Major for piano and violin, Op. 47) together. Pozdnyshev complains that some music is powerful enough to change one's internal state to a foreign one. He hides his raging jealousy and goes on a trip, thinking that the violinist was about to move away; however, he is made aware from his wife's letter that the musician has not left, and has visited her instead. Returning early, he finds Troukhatchevsky and his wife sitting at the table and kills his wife with a dagger. The violinist escapes; Pozdnyshev states, "I wanted to run after him, but remembered that it is ridiculous to run after one's wife's lover in one's socks; and I did not wish to be ridiculous but terrible." He realizes what he has done only a few days later, when he is led to his wife's funeral. He is acquitted of murder in light of his wife's apparent adultery. At the end of his tale, Pozdnyshev implores the narrator for forgiveness.

== Censorship ==
Due to the unusual and scandalous nature of the work for that time, the publication of the Kreutzer Sonata in a magazine or in a separate publication was prohibited by censorship. Only after a conversation between Countess Alexandra Andreevna Tolstaya (Leo Tolstoy's great-aunt, the famous Alexandrine (a girl, chambermaid, tutor of Grand Duchess Maria Alexandrovna)) with Emperor Alexander III, did the emperor allow the story to be published as part of the next volume of Tolstoy's collected works. However, the censorship ban only increased the attractiveness of the story, which long before publication began to be distributed in lists and read in private homes.

In 1890, the United States Post Office Department prohibited the mailing of newspapers containing serialized installments of The Kreutzer Sonata. This was confirmed by the U.S. Attorney General in the same year. Some American publishing houses published excerpts from the story as a separate pamphlet to advertise the story and distributed them through street vendors in New York for a nominal price. Carts even appeared in the city, on which it was written in large letters: “Forbidden by the Russian government and the Postmaster General of the United States is Tolstoy’s best work, The Kreutzer Sonata.” The ban on its sale was struck down in New York and Pennsylvania courts in 1890.

President Theodore Roosevelt called Tolstoy a "sexual moral pervert."

== Epilogue ==
In the Epilogue to the Kreutzer Sonata, published in 1890, Tolstoy clarifies the intended message of the novella, writing:

The conclusion to be drawn from this is that we should stop thinking of carnal love as something particularly exalted, but rather understand that a goal worthy of a human being, such as service to humanity, one’s country, science, or art (not to mention service to God), no matter what it is, if we consider it worthy of a human being, it is not attained by union with an object of love, either in marriage or outside it, but that on the contrary, falling in love and union with one’s object of love (no matter how hard people try to demonstrate the opposite in verse and prose) never facilitates the attainment of a goal worthy of a human being, but always hinders it.

Countering the argument that widespread abstinence would lead to a cessation of the human race, he describes chastity as an ideal that provides guidance and direction, not as a firm rule. Writing from a position of deep religiosity (that he had explained in his Confession in 1882), he points out that not Christ, but the Church (which he despises) instituted marriage. "The ideal of Christianity is love for God and one's neighbor, renunciation of the self for the sake of service to God and one's neighbor. Carnal love and marriage constitute service to oneself and therefore in any case are a hindrance to service to God and other people; therefore from the Christian point of view they are a transgression, a sin".(P. 304.)

During the international celebration of Tolstoy's 80th birthday in 1908, G. K. Chesterton criticized this aspect of Tolstoy's thought in an article in the 19 September issue of Illustrated London News: "Tolstoy is not content with pitying humanity for its pains: such as poverty and prisons. He also pities humanity for its pleasures, such as music and patriotism. He weeps at the thought of hatred; but in The Kreutzer Sonata he weeps almost as much at the thought of love. He and all the humanitarians pity the joys of men." He went on to address Tolstoy directly: "What you dislike is being a man. You are at least next door to hating humanity, for you pity humanity because it is human."

Tolstoy's wife Sophia Tolstaya wrote two novellas countering Tolstoy's "The Kreutzer Sonata". They were not published until the year 2000. In them the husband is portrayed as a man insensitive to the needs of his wife.

== Adaptations ==
=== Plays ===
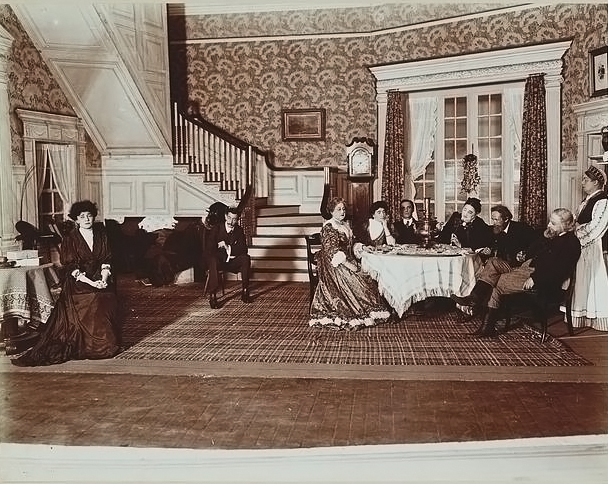
Langdon Mitchell's The Kreutzer Sonata, adapted from Jacob Gordin's earlier Yiddish adaptation, premiered at the Lyric Theatre in New York on September 10, 1906, directed by Harrison Grey Fiske.

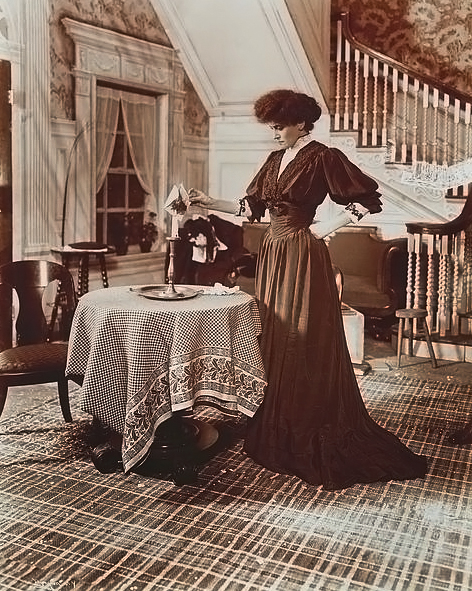
Bertha Kalich portrayed Miriam Friedlander in Langdon Mitchell's The Kreutzer Sonata (1906).

- The novella was adapted into a Yiddish play in 1902 by Russian-Jewish playwright Jacob Gordin. Samuel Schiffman translation debuted at the Manhattan Theatre on August 13, 1906. American playwright Langdon Mitchell also adapted Gordin's version into English, which debuted on Broadway on September 10, 1906.
- In 2007 in Wellington, New Zealand, a newly devised theatrical work, The Kreutzer, was premiered, combining dance, music, theatre and multimedia projections with both pieces of music (Beethoven and Janáček) played live. Sara Brodie provided the adaptation, direction and choreography. A reworked version was presented in Auckland during March 2009 at the Auckland Arts Festival.
- The novella was adapted for the stage by Darko Spasov in 2008, and produced as a one-act play in 2009 for the National Theatre in Štip, Republic of Macedonia, directed by Ljupco Bresliski, performed by Milorad Angelov.
- Laura Wade's Kreutzer vs. Kreutzer is also inspired by Tolstoy.
- The novella was adapted for the stage by Ted Dykstra and produced as a one-act play for the Art of Time Ensemble of Toronto in 2008, and again for the Soulpepper Theatre Company in 2011.
- Nancy Harris adapted the novella into a one-act monologue for the Gate Theatre in London in 2009, directed by Natalie Abrahami and starring Hilton McRae. The production was revived in 2012 at the Gate Theatre, and also at La MaMa in New York City.
- The novella was adapted by Sue Smith for the State Theatre Company of South Australia as part of the 2013 Adelaide Festival. It was directed by Geordie Brookman and featured Renato Musolino (who stepped into the role at the last minute, as a replacement for Barry Otto, who had taken ill).
- A one-act adaptation by Utah playwright Eric Samuelson was produced by Plan-B Theatre Company and the NOVA Chamber Music Series in 2015. It ran from 18 October to 9 November at the Rose Wagner Performing Arts Center in Salt Lake City, Utah. It was directed by Jerry Rapier, and featured Robert Scott Smith, Kathryn Eberle, and Jason Hardink. Eberle and Hardink were musicians in the Utah Symphony at the time.

=== Films ===
The Kreutzer Sonata has been adapted for film well over a dozen times. Some of these include:

- The Kreutzer Sonata (1911, Russian Empire), directed by Pyotr Chardynin
- The Kreutzer Sonata (1914, Russian Empire), directed by Vladimir Gardin
- The Kreutzer Sonata (1915, USA), directed by Herbert Brenon
- Kreutzerova sonáta (1927, Czechoslovakia), directed by Gustav Machatý
- Kreutzersonate (1937, Germany), directed by Veit Harlan
- Celos (Jealousy, 1946, Argentina), directed by Mario Soffici and starring Pedro López Lagar and Zully Moreno
- Prelude to Madness (1948, Italy), directed by Gianni Franciolini
- La Sonate à Kreutzer (1956, France), short film directed by Éric Rohmer
- Locura pasional (Passionate Madness, 1956, Mexico), directed by Tulio Demicheli and starring Silvia Pinal and Carlos López Moctezuma
- Kreitserova sonata (1969, TV, Yugoslavia) directed by Jovan Konjović
- The Kreutzer Sonata (1987, USSR), directed by Mikhail Shveytser
- Quale amore (2006, Italy), directed by Maurizio Sciarra
- The Kreutzer Sonata (2008, UK), directed by Bernard Rose and starring Elisabeth Röhm
- Sonata (2013, Spain), directed by Jon Ander Tomás

=== Music ===
- The novella, inspired by Beethoven's music, in turn gave rise to Leoš Janáček's First String Quartet.
- In Frederic Rzewski's piece Marriage for speaking pianist the performer recites Pozdnyshev's words while playing the instrument.

=== Ballet ===
In 2000, the Carolina Ballet, with original choreography by Robert Weiss and combining the music of Beethoven, Janáček, and J. Mark Scearce, mounted an innovative production combining dance and drama, with a narrator/actor telling the story and flashbacks leading into the ballet segments.

=== Painting ===
The novella inspired the 1901 painting The Kreutzer Sonata by René François Xavier Prinet, which shows a passionate kiss between the violinist and the pianist. The painting was used for years in Tabu perfume ads.

=== Novels ===
Arab Israeli author Sayed Kashua's 2010 novel Second Person Singular echoes The Kreutzer Sonata set in present-day Israel. A copy of The Kreutzer Sonata also functions as a major plot device.

The Dutch author Margriet de Moor wrote a book called Kreutzersonate (2001) after Janáček's string quartet, which was inspired by the novella and Beethoven.

== See also ==
- Leo Tolstoy bibliography
