= Violin Sonata No. 9 (Beethoven) =

1803 composition for violin and piano by Ludwig van Beethoven

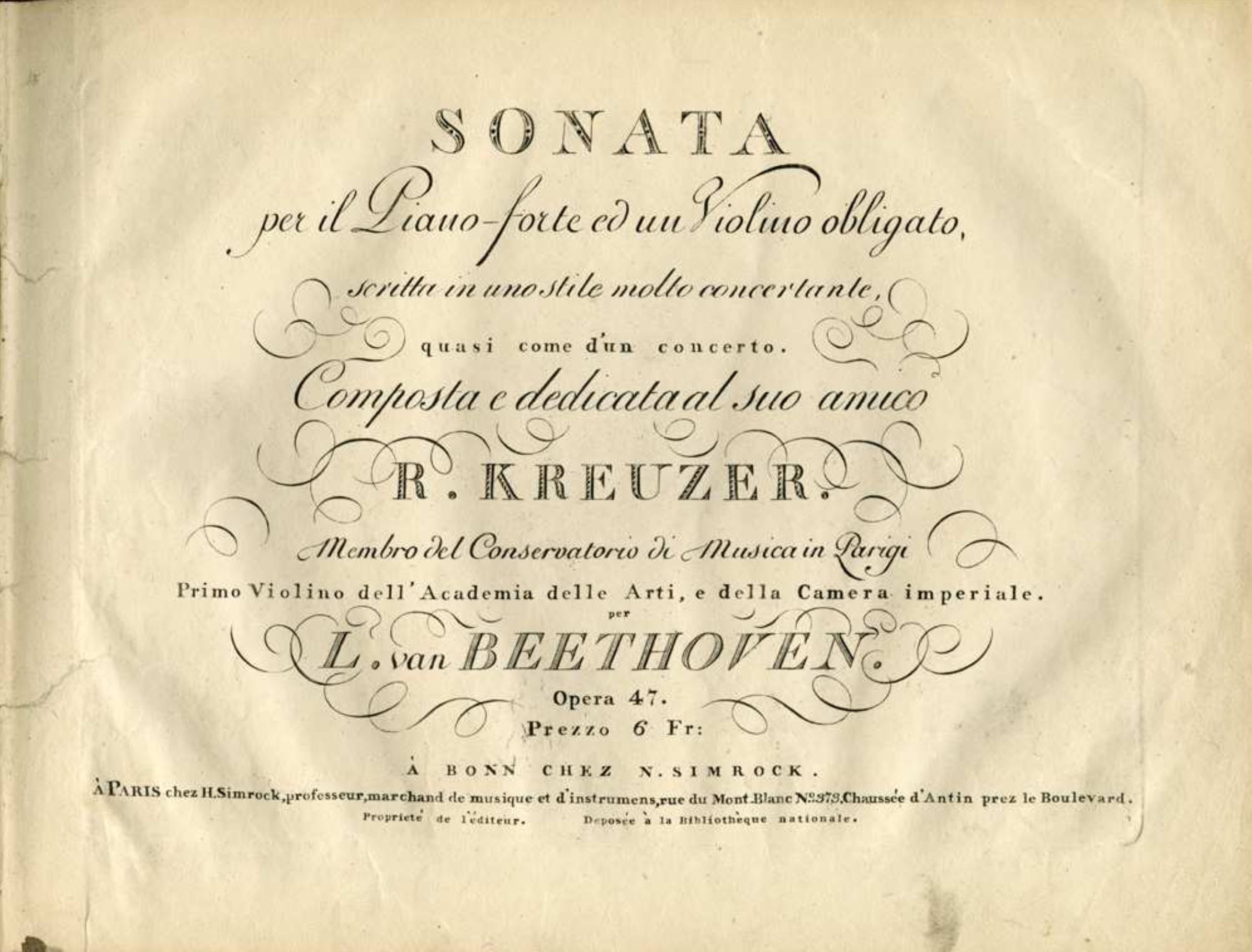
Title page of an original edition of the Kreutzer Sonata

The Violin Sonata No. 9 in A major, Op. 47, by Ludwig van Beethoven, is an 1803 sonata for piano and violin notable for its technical difficulty, unusual length (around 40 minutes), and emotional scope. It is commonly known as the Kreutzer Sonata (Kreutzer-Sonate) after the violinist Rodolphe Kreutzer, to whom it was ultimately dedicated, but who thoroughly disliked the piece and refused to play it.

== Composition ==
Efrem Zimbalist & Harold Bauer playing Theme and Variations from "The Kreutzer Sonata" by Beethoven (1926)

In the composer's 1803 sketchbook, the work was titled "Sonata per il Pianoforte ed uno violino obligato in uno stile molto concertante come d'un concerto" ("Sonata for the piano and one obligatory violin in a highly concertante style like a concerto"). The final movement of the work was originally written for another, earlier, sonata for violin and piano by Beethoven, the Sonata No. 6, Op. 30, No. 1, in A major.

Beethoven gave no key designation to the work. Although the work is usually titled as being in A major, the Austrian composer and music theoretician Gerhard Präsent has published articles indicating that the main key is in fact A minor.

== Premiere and dedication ==
The sonata was originally dedicated to the violinist George Bridgetower (1778–1860) as "Sonata mulattica composta per il mulatto Brischdauer [Bridgetower], gran pazzo e compositore mulattico" (Mulatto Sonata composed for the mulatto Brischdauer, great madman mulatto composer). Shortly after completion the work was premiered by Bridgetower and Beethoven on 24 May 1803 at the Augarten Theatre at a concert that started at the unusually early hour of 8:00 am. Bridgetower sight-read the sonata; he had never seen the work before, and there had been no time for any rehearsal.

After the premiere performance, Beethoven and Bridgetower fell out: while the two were drinking, Bridgetower apparently insulted the morals of a woman whom Beethoven cherished. Enraged, Beethoven removed the dedication of the piece, dedicating it instead to Rodolphe Kreutzer, who was considered the finest violinist of the day.

== Structure ==
I. Adagio sostenuto – Presto

II. Andante con variazioni

III. Presto
Performed by Paul Rosenthal and Edward Auer

The piece is in three movements, and takes approximately 43 minutes to perform:

1. Adagio sostenuto – Presto (A major – A minor, sonata form, about 15 minutes in length)
2. Andante con variazioni (F major, variation form, with the third variation in F minor, about 18 minutes)
3. Presto (A major, sonata form, about 10 minutes)

The sonata opens with a slow 18-bar introduction, of which only the first four bars of the solo violin are in A major. The piano enters, and the harmony begins to turn darker towards the minor key, until the main body of the movement – an angry A-minor Presto – begins. Here, the piano part matches the violin's in terms of difficulty. Near the end, Beethoven brings back part of the opening Adagio, before closing the movement in an anguished coda.

There could hardly be a greater contrast with the second movement, a placid tune in F major followed by five distinctive variations. The first variation transliterates the theme into a lively triple meter while embellishing it with trills, while in the second the violin steals the melody and enlivens it even further. The third variation, in F minor, returns to a darker and more meditative state. The fourth recalls the first and second variations with its light, ornamental, and airy feel. The fifth and final variation, the longest, caps the movement with a slower and more dramatic feel, nevertheless returning to the carefree F major.

The calm is broken by a crashing A major chord in the piano, ushering in the virtuosic and exuberant third movement, a 6/8 tarantella in sonata form. After moving through a series of slightly contrasting episodes, the theme returns for the last time, and the work ends jubilantly in a rush of A major.

== Reception ==
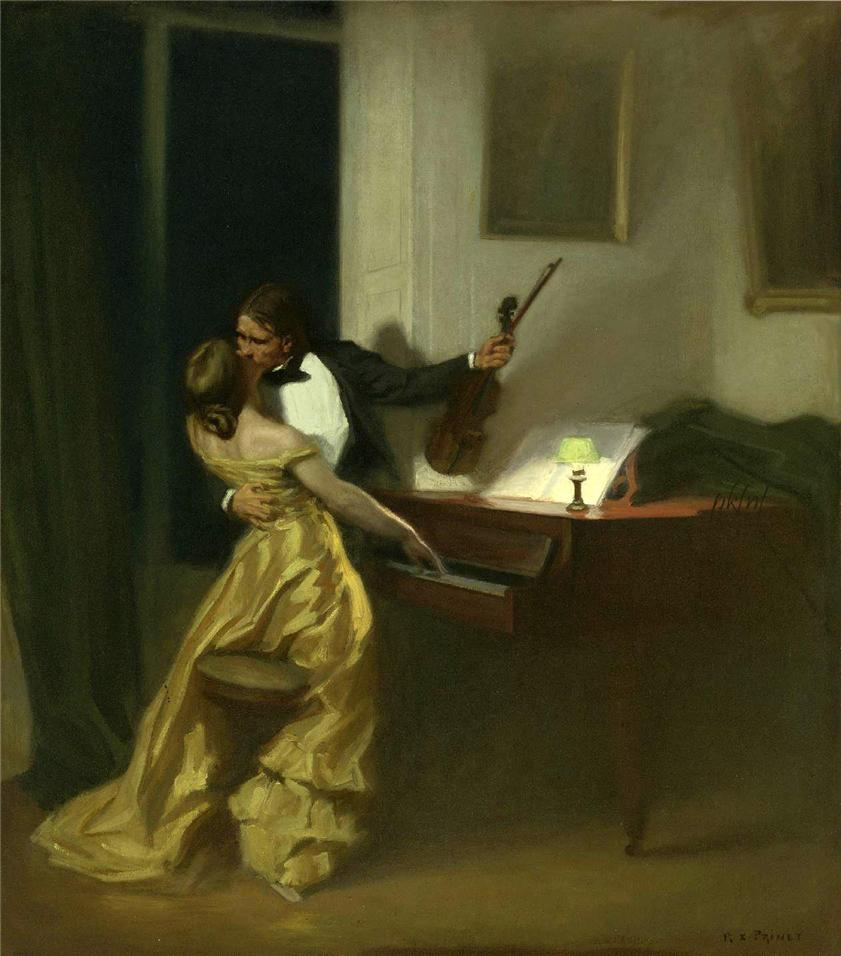
The Kreutzer Sonata (1901), painting by René-Xavier Prinet, based on Leo Tolstoy's 1889 novella, The Kreutzer Sonata

After its successful premiere in 1803, the work was published in 1805 as Beethoven's Op. 47, with its re-dedication to Rudolphe Kreutzer, which gave the composition its nickname. Kreutzer never performed the work, considering it "outrageously unintelligible". He did not particularly care for any of Beethoven's music, and they only ever met once, briefly.

Referring to Beethoven's composition, Leo Tolstoy's novella The Kreutzer Sonata was first published in 1889. In it, the protagonist refers to the piece as "passionate to the point of obscenity". The novella was adapted in various stage and film productions, contributing to Beethoven's composition becoming known to the general public. Leoš Janáček's 1923 String Quartet No. 1, subtitled Kreutzer Sonata, was, in turn, inspired by Tolstoy's novella.

Rita Dove's 2009 Sonata Mulattica reimagined the life of Bridgetower, the sonata's original dedicatee, in poetry, thus writing about the sonata that connected the composer and the violinist who first performed it.
