= Tabu by Dana =

Women's fragrance

Tabu
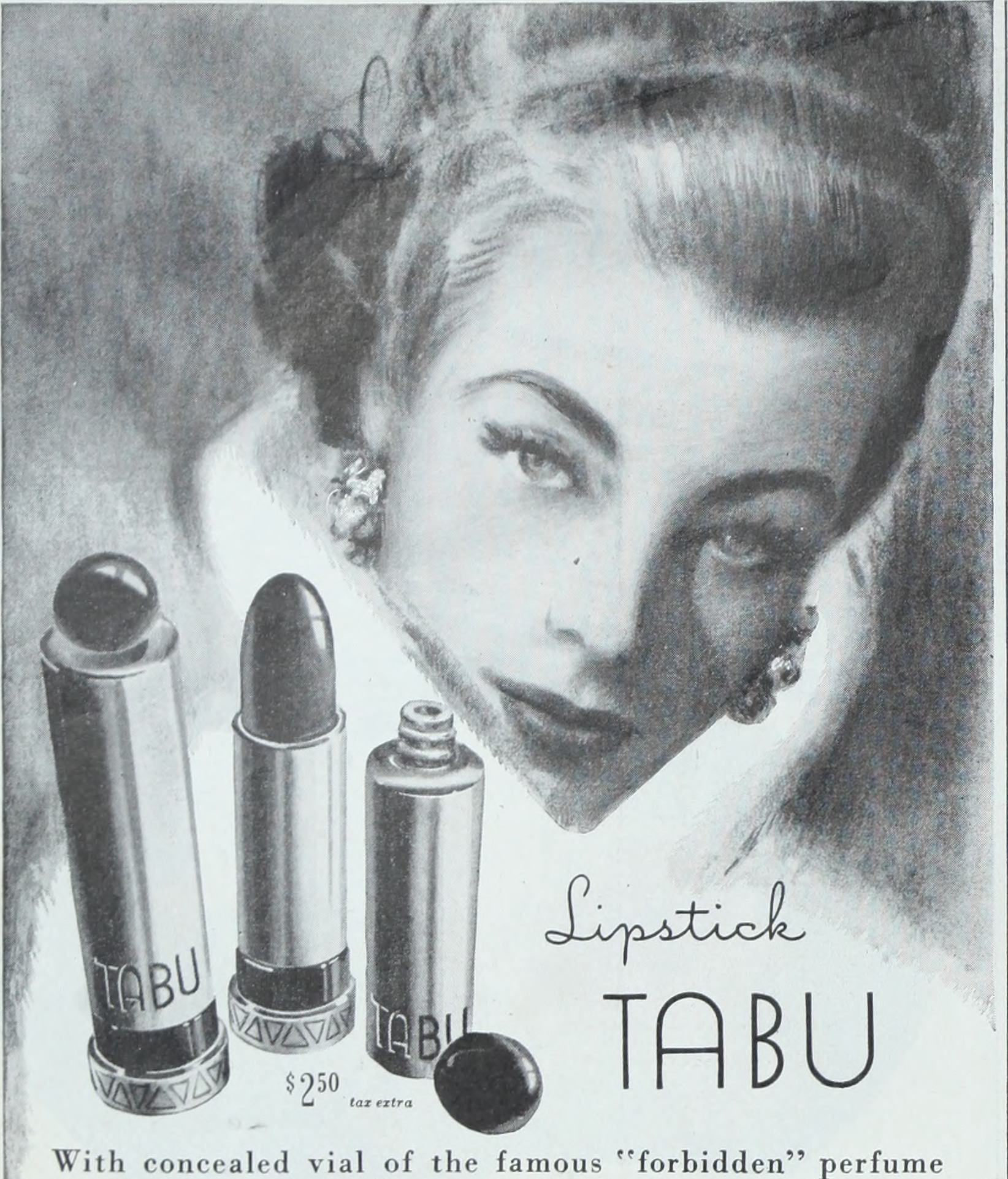
- Tabu by Dana in The Ladies' home journal (1948)

Fragrance by Dana
- Released: 1931

Tabu by Dana is a women's fragrance created by French perfumer Jean Carles in 1931.

== Origins ==
The House of Dana was a perfumery established in 1932 in Barcelona, Spain by lawyer Javier Serra. It was later headquartered in Paris.

In 1940, it relocated to the US during the German occupation of France during World War II. Carles worked for Roure Bertrand, a company associated with fashion houses such as Nina Ricci, Christian Dior, Elsa Schiaparelli and Cristóbal Balenciaga.

In June 1999, Dana Perfumes Corp.'s parent company, Renaissance Cosmetics, filed for Chapter 11 bankruptcy protection, and would be sold to Dimeling, Schreiber & Park in August 1999, rebranding as New Dana Perfumes. New Dana Perfumes would later sell all of its brands, including Tabu, to a similarly named company called Dana Classic Fragrances in November 2003. IMG Holdings, the parent company of Dana Classic Fragrances, filed for Chapter 11 bankruptcy in August 2025.

== Ingredients ==
Carles used an exceptionally high dose of patchouli (10%), which he combined with clove (carnation), oakmoss and benzoin (vanilla effect). Other notes include bergamot, neroli, orange, coriander, narcissus, clover, rose, ylang-ylang, jasmine, cedar, sandalwood, vetiver, civet, amber, and musk. Supposedly Dana told Carles to "make a perfume a prostitute would wear". It was one of the first amber scents created in the perfume world and one of the heaviest. It was the inspiration for the later ambers Tuvara (1948) and Youth-Dew (1953).

== Advertising ==
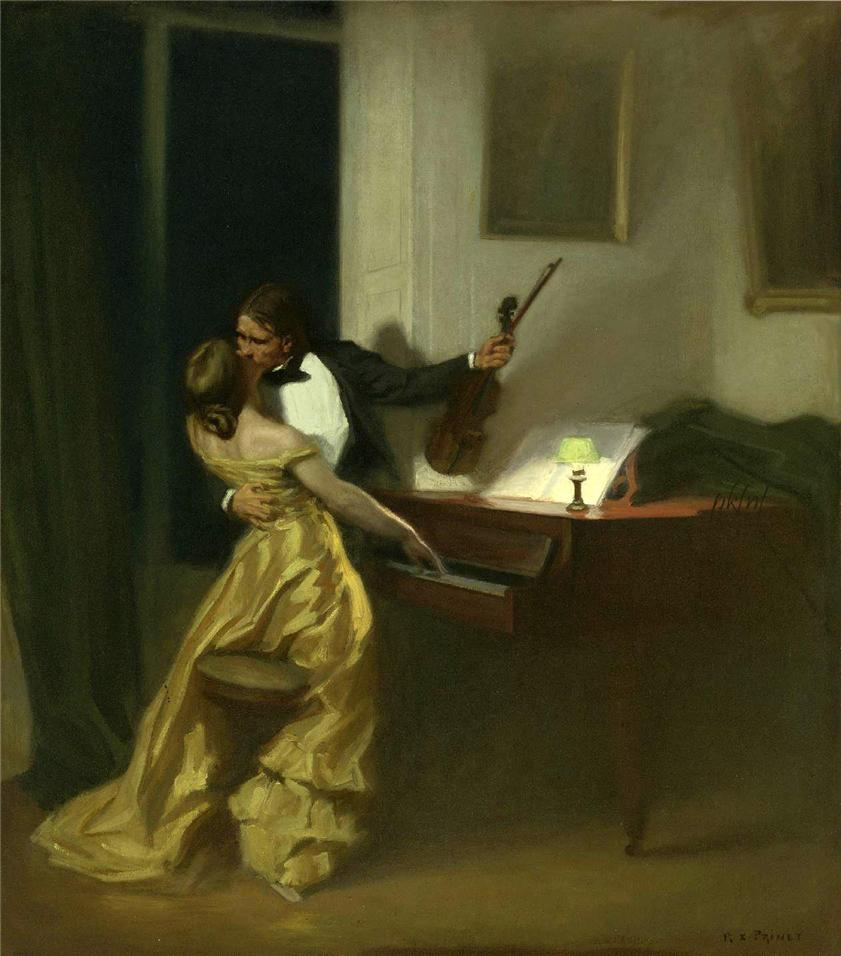
Prinet - Kreutzer Sonata painting used in advertising Tabu

The long-running print advertisement of Dan's Tabu reproduced the 1901 painting The Kreutzer Sonata by René-Xavier Prinet, inspired by the novella of the same title by Leo Tolstoy, showing a violinist, overcome with passion, breaking off his performance to embrace his female accompanist. The advertisement's tagline was "Tabu, the forbidden fragrance". People looked at the advertisement and linked the embracing couple with the fragrance.

== Gallery ==
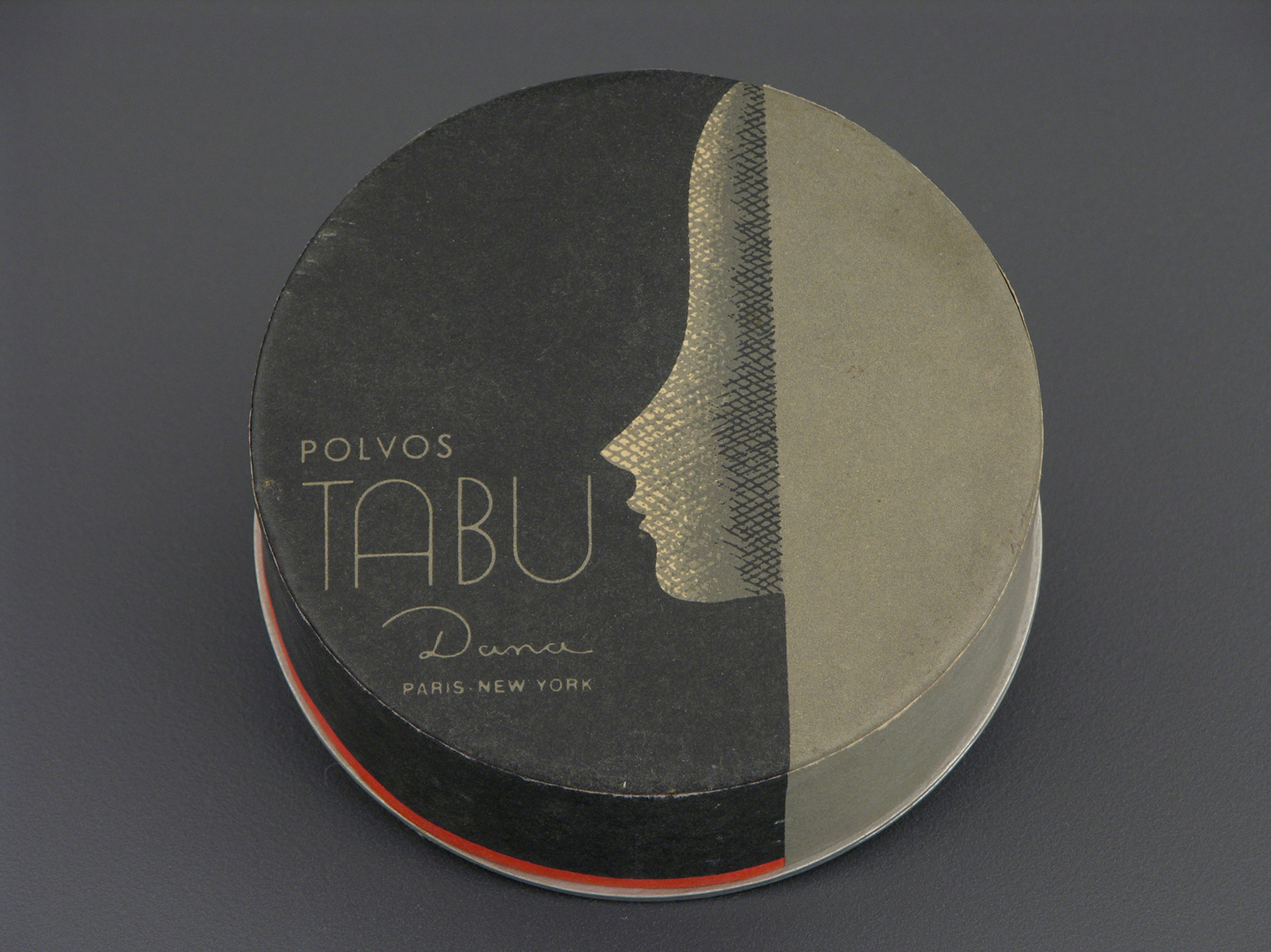

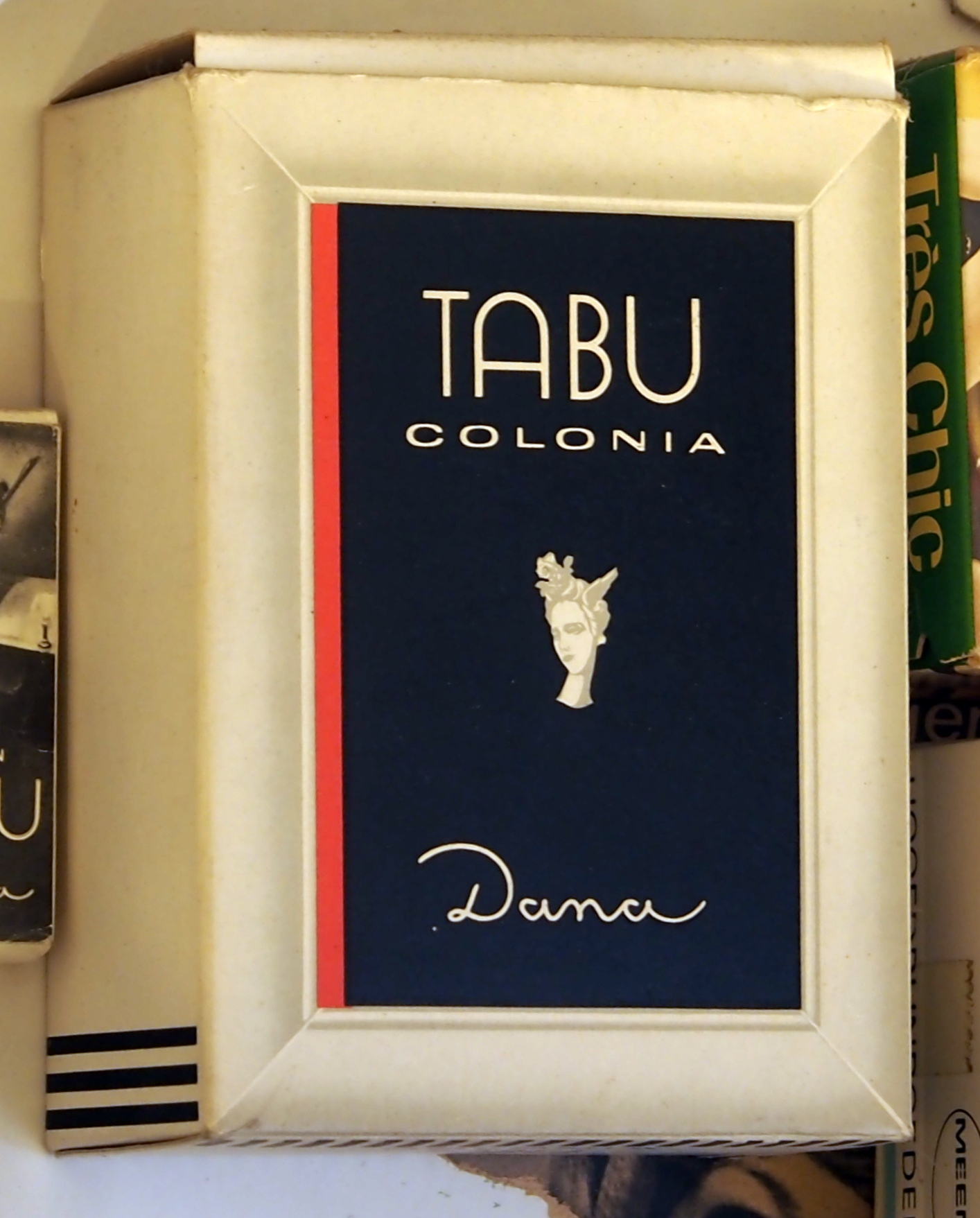
