= The Kreutzer Sonata (painting) =

1901 painting by René-Xavier Prinet

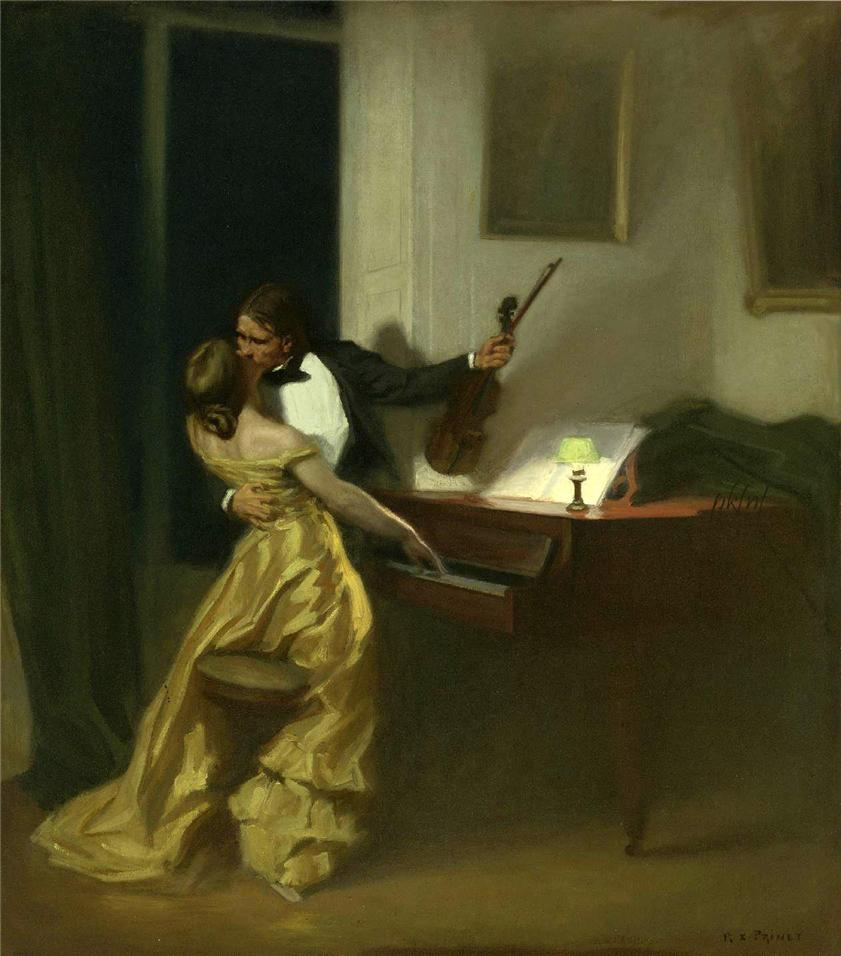
- Artist: René-Xavier Prinet
- Year: 1901
- Medium: Oil painting on canvas
- Dimensions: 116.8 cm × 104.1 cm (46.0 in × 41.0 in)

The Kreutzer Sonata is a 1901 oil painting on canvas by French painter René-Xavier Prinet, inspired by Leo Tolstoy's 1889 novella of the same title, which was named after Beethoven's violin and piano composition dedicated to Rudolph Kreutzer.

It depicts a female pianist, dressed in a golden gown, who is pulled up from her stool by a male violinist, who embraces her with one hand around her waist while they kiss. It was first exhibited at Paris, Salon in 1901, and then in Munich and Stuttgart.

The painting was later used to advertise the perfume Tabu by Dana, and may possibly have been the inspiration for a scene in Raj Kapoor's 1949 film Barsaat and subsequently his R. K. logo.

== Background ==
The Kreutzer Sonata is an oil painting on canvas by René-Xavier Prinet, who was inspired by Leo Tolstoy's 1889 novella of the same name, the title of which is based on Beethoven's violin and piano composition dedicated to Rudolph Kreutzer, a music piece renowned for its diverse emotions; intense anger, deep meditation, and extreme happiness. The story portrays the murder of a wife by her husband, Pozdnyshev, who suspects her of being unfaithful with the violinist, Trukachevsky, after returning home and seeing them sitting at the dinner table. The book was published in 1889, but was banned in Russia for a short while before it was released.

== Composition ==
The painting measures 116.8 by 104.1 cm. It depicts a female pianist dressed in a golden gown, who is pulled up from her stool by a formally dressed male violinist, who holds her with his right hand around her waist. His violin is held up in his left outstretched hand, while her fingers still just about touch the piano keys. She is semi-upright in his embrace as they kiss. They are the focus of the painting, with the surroundings blurred or empty. A candle provides some illumination.

== Exhibition ==
It was first exhibited at Paris, Salon in 1901, where it was purchased by Luitpold, Prince Regent of Bavaria. It was also exhibited at Munich and Stuttgart. In 1994, it was sold at Sotheby's, New York.

== Adaptations and responses ==
For decades from 1941, the painting was reproduced to promote the perfume Tabu; a "forbidden" fragrance, created in 1931. It first appeared in Vogue, Harper's Bazaar and Town & Country. By 1961, the advert had appeared in publications nearly 4,000 times. The New York Times described it as the advertising industry's "longest kiss". Donald Eaton Carr wrote in his Forgotten senses (1972) that it was probably "the longest kiss in history". People looked at the advertisement and assumed the company paying for it linked the embracing couple with the fragrance. Some objected to the advertising slogans such as "stay away from Tabu if you can't accept its challenge". In 1973, the advert appeared with female and male roles reversed. Gershon Legman, in his Rationale of the Dirty Joke (2007), noted the use of the painting in the Tabu advertisement and described the pair's pose as "inspired by Tolstoy's shocked remarks about the 'eroticism' of Beethoven's Kreutzer Sonata when played by a man and a woman".

According to Rahul Rawail, it may possibly have been the inspiration of a scene in Raj Kapoor's 1949 film Barsaat. The scene in turn inspired the R. K. logo by M. R. Acharekar, depicting Kapoor as the violinist, with the actress Nargis in his arms, and was in use by the time of release of Kapoor's film Awaara (1951).

Adrian Daub questioned why the violin is positioned so far out, and why is the curtain behind them missing. The violinist has also been described as "dishevelled", and hairy.
