= Eric Samuelsen =

American dramatist

- Born: Eric Roy Samuelsen; April 10, 1956; Provo, Utah, U.S.
- Died: September 20, 2019 (aged 63)
- Education: Brigham Young University (B.A.); Indiana University Bloomington (Ph.D.)
- Spouse: Annette Mason (1980-2019)
- Children: 4
- Writing career
- Genre: Drama
- Notable awards: AML playwright award (1994, 1997, 1999); Smith Pettit Award (2012)
- Website: MormonIconoclast.com

Eric Roy Samuelsen (April 10, 1956 – September 20, 2019) was an American playwright and emeritus professor of theatre at Brigham Young University in Provo, Utah. He is considered one of the most important Mormon playwrights. He won the Association for Mormon Letters (AML) drama award in 1994, 1997, and 1999, and was AML president from 2007 to 2009. In 2012 he received the Smith–Pettit Foundation Award for Outstanding Contribution to Mormon Letters.

== Biography ==
Eric Samuelsen was born in Provo, Utah, but spent most of his early life in Bloomington, Indiana. His father Roy was an opera singer, which introduced young Samuelsen to a love for theater productions. As a young man he served in Norway as a missionary for the Church of Jesus Christ of Latter-day Saints (LDS Church). He received a bachelor's degree in theatre from Brigham Young University in 1983 and returned to Bloomington and earned a Ph.D. from Indiana University in 1991. He taught at Wright State University in Dayton, Ohio before joining the faculty at Brigham Young University in 1992.

From 1999 to 2011 Samuelsen ran BYU's playwrighting program. Throughout his career, at least 24 of Samuelsen's plays were produced professionally throughout the United States, including California, Indiana, Louisiana, New York, and Utah.

Most of Samuelsen's early plays were produced at Brigham Young University, but around 2003 he began a relationship with Plan-B Theatre Company. Since 2006, Plan-B premiered a Samuelsen play every year. He became its playwright in residence in 2012, and many of his newer plays were produced there. This may be due to a more controversial bent in later plays; Borderlands has a character who is an openly gay Mormon youth.

Following illness and a diagnosis of polymyositis, a degenerative muscular disease, Samuelsen retired from BYU in 2012, where he had taught for 20 years. The next year, Plan-B Theatre Company dedicated 2013 as the "Season of Eric", presenting four of Samuelsen's plays.

== Works ==
=== 1970s ===
- Letter From a Prophet, co-written by Charles Metten. Produced at Brigham Young University, fall 1978. Directed by Charles Metten.
- A Girl Who Blushes. One act. Produced April, 1978, at Mormon Festival of the Arts at Brigham Young University.
- Playing the Game. Produced in 1979 at Brigham Young University.

=== 1980s ===
- Emma. Opera libretto, music by Murray Boren. Produced at Brigham Young University 1984. Subsequently, produced by Hell's Kitchen Opera company in 1984.
- Sex and the New York Yankees. One act. Produced by Bloomington Playwrights Project, Bloomington Indiana.

== =1990s ==
- Accommodations. Produced at Brigham Young University, 1993. Subsequently, published in Sunstone magazine, June 1994. Won AML annual award in drama, 1994. Directed by Thomas Rogers.
- The Seating of Senator Smoot. Produced at Brigham Young University, 1996. Directed by Robert Nelson. The play was also videotaped and broadcast on KBYU.
- Gadianton. Produced at Brigham Young University, 1997. Directed by Robert Nelson. Subsequently, published in Sunstone. Won AML award in drama, 1997. Subsequently, produced at University of Louisiana at Monroe. Anthologized in Mahonri Stewart, Saints on Stage. Zarahemla Press, 2013.
- Without Romance. Produced at Brigham Young University, 1997. Subsequently, produced at Mormon Arts Festival.
- The Christmas Box. Adapted from the novel by Richard Paul Evans. Music by Murray Boren. Produced as a musical at BYU, Pardoe Theater, 1997. Directed by Rodger Sorensen.
- Winding Sheet. SLAC staged reading, Dec. 1998. About a Victorian social reformer and prostitution.
- Coughlaugh. A theatrical experiment in one act. Blaine Sundrud directed a production at Brigham Young University in 1998. Later produced in 2010 at Brigham Young University.
- The Way We’re Wired. Produced at Brigham Young University, 1999. Won AML award for drama, 1999. Subsequently, produced by Nauvoo Theatrical Society in Orem in 2003, directed by Eric Samuelsen. Also adapted by Samuelsen into a novel, Singled Out. Cornerstone, 2000.

=== 2000s ===
- A Love Affair with Electrons. Produced at Brigham Young University 2000. Directed by Eric Samuelsen.
- Three Women, 3 one act plays on Mormon women, VIP Arts' Little Brown Theatre, Springville, 2001. Bar and Kell, Community Standard, and Judgment.
- What Really Happened. Produced at Brigham Young University, 2001.
- Magnificence. March 2002, BYU Margetts. Samuelsen adapted this medieval play by John Skelton.
- Peculiarities. Several one acts, produced in several iterations. Tony Gunn directed four one acts in Springville, 2005. Plan B Theatre produced three one acts, including Kiss, which was not included in the production Tony Gunn directed. Jerry Rapier directed a film version, with all six short plays included.
- Family. Produced at Brigham Young University in 2005. Directed by David Morgan. Won AML Drama award, also published in Sunstone. Subsequently, produced at Dixie College in St. George, Utah, in 2006. Published in Sunstone March 2005.
- Miasma. First done as ten-minute play for Plan-B Theatre Company SLAM, 2005, as The Butcher, The Beggar and the Bed-time Buddy. Subsequently, produced as full-length play at Plan-B, 2006, published in Plays From Beyond the Zion Curtain.
- Blood Pudding, 10-minute play, done for Plan-B Theatre Company SLAM, 2006.
- Behind the Blue Door, 10-minute play, done for Plan-B Theatre Company SLAM, 2007.
- Burning Desire, 10-minute play, done for Plan-B Theatre Company SLAM, 2008.
- Perfect Circle, 10-minute play, done for Plan-B Theatre Company/Theatre Arts Conservatory Student SLAM, 2009.
- Inversion. Produced by Plan-B Theatre Company/Theatre Arts Conservatory, Salt Lake, Rose Wagner, 2008.
- Intersection. Produced by Plan-B Theatre Company/Theatre Arts Conservatory, Salt Lake, Rose Wagner, 2009.

=== 2010s ===
- He and She Fighting: A Love Story. New Play Project in Provo, 2010. Directed by Davey Morrison-Dillard.
- Amerigo. Produced by Plan-B Theatre Company in Salt Lake City, 2010. Subsequently, published in More Plays from Behind the Zion Curtain.
- Borderlands. Produced by Plan-B Theatre Company in Salt Lake City, 2011. Directed by Jerry Rapier. Published in Sunstone, July 2009, and in 2012 in Plan-B's Even More Plays from Behind the Zion Curtain.
- The Plan. Brinton Black Box Theater in the Covey Center for the Arts, Provo, Utah, 2011 Published in Sunstone, July 2009.
- Blind Dates. Covey Center for the Arts, 2012. Four humorous short plays, all with the same title, about blind dates gone wrong. Inspired by the late Horton Foote's original work. Eric Samuelsen, J. Scott Bronson and Melissa Lelani Larson created original works to go along with the original play by Foote.
- Nothing Personal. Produced by Plan-B Theatre Company in Salt Lake City, Rose Wagner, 2013. Directed by Jerry Rapier.
- Radio Hour Episode 8: Fairyana. Produced by Plan-B Theatre Company and KUER's RadioWest in Salt Lake City, Rose Wagner, 2013. Directed by Cheryl Ann Cluff.
- Clearing Bombs. Produced by Plan-B Theatre Company in Salt Lake City, Rose Wagner, 2014. Directed by Eric Samuelsen.
- 3. Produced by Plan-B Theatre Company in Salt Lake City, Rose Wagner, 2014. Directed by Cheryl Ann Cluff. Includes three short plays, Bar and Kell, Community Standard, and Duets, two of which were earlier produced as Three Women.
- The Kreutzer Sonata. Produced by Plan-B Theatre Company and NOVA Chamber Music Seriesin Salt Lake City, Rose Wagner, October 2015, Jerry Rapier directing.
- The Ice Front. Produced by Plan-B Theatre Company in Salt Lake City, Rose Wagner, 2017.
- Cassandra. Produced at the Great Salt Lake Fringe Festival, 2018.
