= String Quartet No. 1 (Janáček) =

String quartet by Leoš Janáček

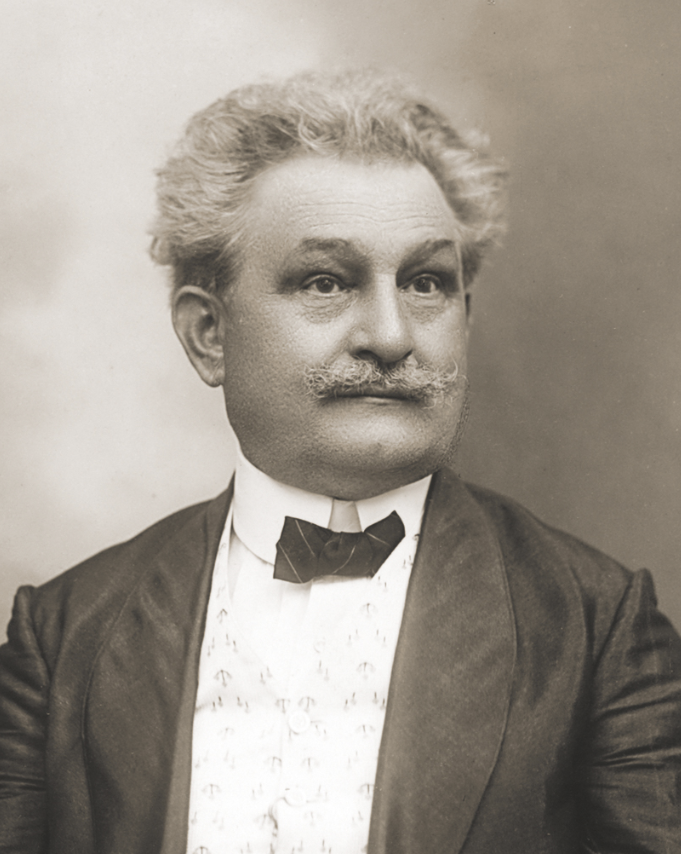
Leoš Janáček in 1914

Leoš Janáček's String Quartet No. 1, called "The Kreutzer Sonata", was written quickly between 13 and 28 October 1923 at a time of great creative concentration, and then revised, in the autograph, from 30 October to 7 November 1923. It was inspired by Leo Tolstoy's novella The Kreutzer Sonata, which had itself been inspired by Beethoven's Violin Sonata No. 9, known as the "Kreutzer" after its dedicatee, Rodolphe Kreutzer. The premiere was given on 17 October 1924 by the Czech Quartet at a concert of the Spolek pro moderní hudbu (Contemporary Music Society) at the Mozarteum in Prague. A pocket score was published in April 1925 by Hudební matice.

Janáček had used the Tolstoy novella earlier as well, in 1908–1909, when it inspired him to compose a Piano Trio in three movements. This is lost but surviving fragments of it suggest similarities to the quartet, and reconstructions as a piano trio have been made and performed.

== Background ==
The "Kreutzer Sonata" quartet was the first to be composed after a request from the Bohemian Quartet who, in 1923, requested Janáček to compose two string quartets for them. The second was the "Intimate Letters" quartet.

== Structure and style ==
"I was imagining a poor woman, tormented and run down, just like the one the Russian writer Tolstoy describes in his Kreutzer Sonata", Janáček confided in one of his letters to his young friend Kamila Stösslová. In the music of the quartet is depicted psychological drama containing moments of conflict as well as emotional outbursts, passionate work rush towards catharsis and to final climax.

The composition consists of four movements:

1. Adagio – Con moto
2. Con moto
3. Con moto – Vivo – Andante
4. Con moto – (Adagio) – Più mosso

The thematic idea central to the whole work is very similar to the theme of the composer's Danube symphony (1923–25). Using a principle of thematic montage, the quartet almost abandons the fields of traditional harmony, homophony and counterpoint and instead makes free with the varied sonic factors typical of Janáček, including his characteristic modal inflections.

== Arrangements ==
1. Arrangement suitable for: two violins, viola and cello
  - arrangement for: soundtrack of the film Le Paltoquet
  - arrangement by: Quentin Damamme
  - performed by: Viotti Quartet
2. Arrangement suitable for: two violins, viola and cello
  - arrangement for: string orchestra
  - arrangement by: Richard Tognetti
  - performed by: Australian Chamber Orchestra, co Richard Tognetti
3. Arrangement suitable for: two violins, viola and cello
  - arrangement for: string orchestra
  - arrangement by: Mario Brunello
  - performed by: Orchestra d’Archi Italiana, co Mario Brunello
4. Arrangement suitable for: two violins, viola and cello
  - arrangement for: piano trio
  - arrangement by: Michal Hájků, (pseudonym of Jarmil Burghauser)
  - performed by: Abegg Trio
5. Arrangement suitable for: two violins, viola and cello
  - arrangement for:
  - arrangement by: Till Alexander Körber
  - performed by: Merlin Ensemble
6. Arrangement suitable for: two violins, viola and cello
  - arrangement for: piano trio
  - arrangement by: Stephen Coxe
  - performed by: Weilerstein Trio
