= René-Xavier Prinet =

French painter

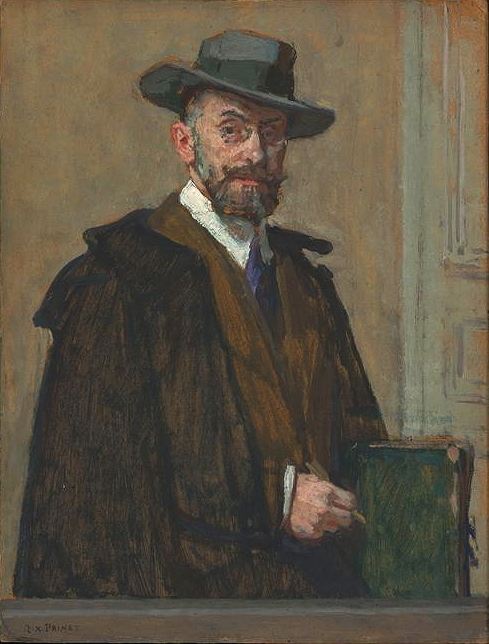
- Self-portrait (c. 1910), musée d'Orsay, Paris
- Born: 31 December 1861; Vitry-le-François, France
- Died: 26 January 1946 (aged 84); Bourbonne-les-Bains, France
- Resting place: Bourbonne-les-Bains, France
- Education: Jean-Léon Gérôme
- Known for: Painting, illustrating
- Movement: Impressionism
- Spouse: Jeanne Jaquemin (m. 1894)

René François Xavier Prinet (31 December 1861, Vitry-le-François – 26 January 1946, Bourbonne-les-Bains) was a French painter and illustrator.

== Biography ==
Born to a family of notables from Franche-Comté (the Prinet notaries originally from Luxeuil-les-Bains), René-Xavier Prinet was the son of Henry Prinet, born in 1824, imperial prosecutor in Vitry-le-François, and the brother of Gaston Prinet, diplomat. Appointed to Paris, Henry Prinet lived with his family on rue Bonaparte, a stone's throw from the École des beaux-arts, for which René-Xavier seemed to be destined. His father painted as a hobby and was supportive of his desire to study art, having him seek the advice of Louis Charles Timbal, a well-known church painter and friend of the family. Through his maternal grandmother, René-Xavier Prinet is related to the court painters Hubert Drouais (1699–1767) and François-Hubert Drouais (1727–1775).

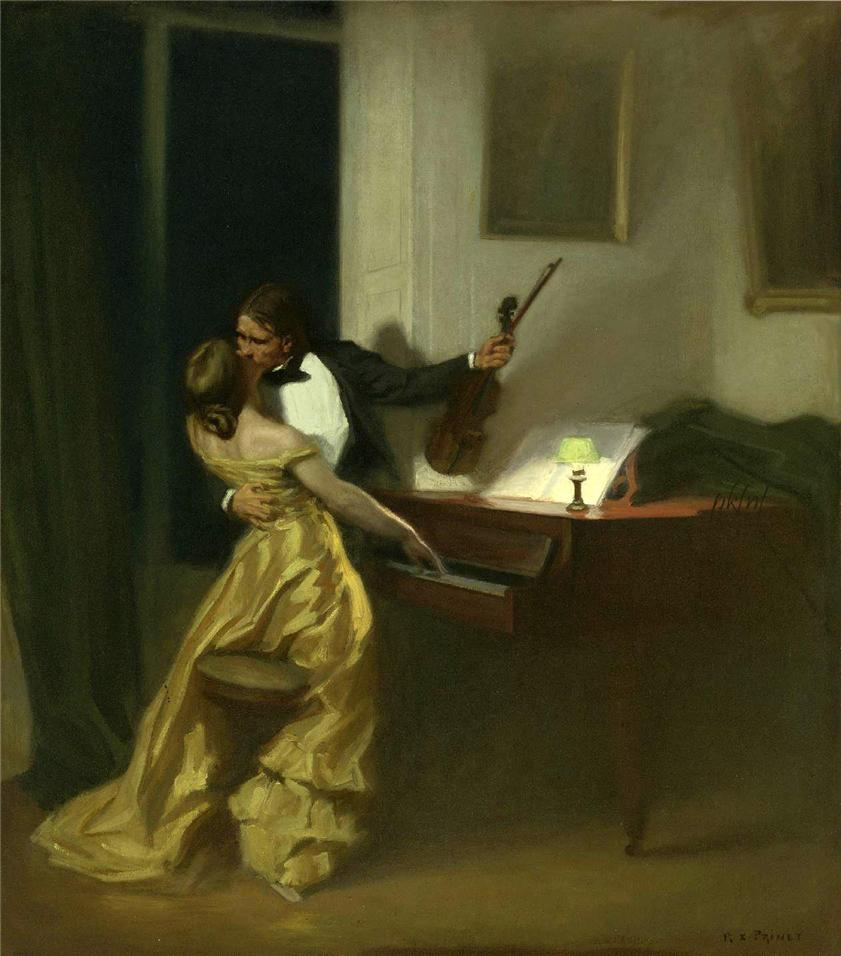
La Sonate à Kreutzer (1901), private collection.

Around 1880, he began his studies in earnest, in the studios of Jean-Léon Gérôme. He remained with the master until 1885. He then became friends with the Franche-Comté painters Georges and Lucien Griveau, and with his fellow students at the Beaux-Arts, Antonio de La Gandara, Louis-Auguste Girardot, Félix Desgranges and Jules-Alexis Muenier. This was followed by studies at the Académie Julian.

His painting Jésus enfant was accepted for display at the Salon in 1885. He exhibited at this Salon until 1889. In 1891, he received a commission from the French State for the decoration of the Palais de la Légion d'Honneur: Les Quatre Saisons. His sketches were accepted. The same year, he exhibited in Paris at the Durand-Ruel gallery with Albert Besnard, Jules-Alexis Muenier and Henri Fantin-Latour.

In 1894, René-Xavier Prinet married Jeanne Jaquemin (1865–1958), a native of Bourbonne-les-Bains, whose bust was made by Antoine Bourdelle in 1910, at La Madeleine, Paris.

His parents-in-law, Auguste and Louise-Berthe, residents of Bourbonne-les-Bains and Paris, having built a villa on the seafront of Cabourg around 1870 called the Double Six chalet, he spent his summers there from that time. He then painted many pictures of the beach of the Normandy resort, then in full expansion. Only a few hundred meters separated the Grand Hôtel de Cabourg, where Marcel Proust resided during his many stays in the seaside town, from the Double Six. Although there is no formal proof that the two men met, it is clear that the atmosphere depicted by Prinet corresponds exactly to that described by Proust in his texts. Works by the painter would later regularly enrich exhibitions in homage to the writer.

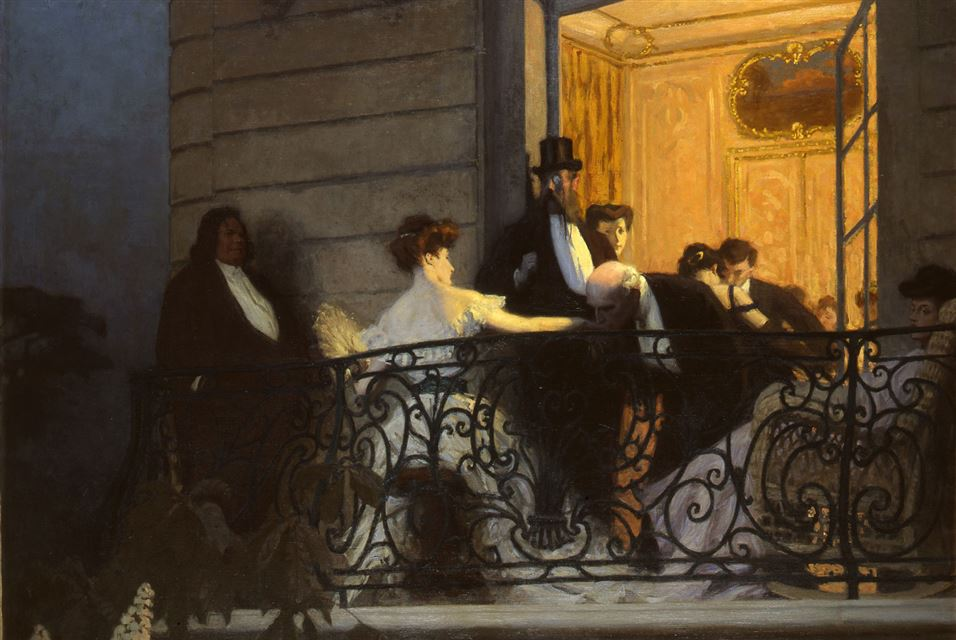
Le Balcon (1905–1906), musée des Beaux-Arts de Caen

At this time, he also became associated with a group of young artists known as the Bande Noire (Black Stripe), which included Lucien Simon, André Dauchez, Émile-René Ménard and Charles Cottet.

In June 1899, he joined the Société nouvelle de peintres et de sculpteurs, with a first collective exhibition at the Galerie Georges Petit in Paris in March 1900. One of his best-known works, The Kreutzer Sonata, was exhibited in 1901 at the "L'Art français contemporain" exhibition in Stuttgart where it was sold to Luitpold, Prince Regent of Bavaria.

He then began teaching with his friends Dauchez, Ménard, Cottet, Simon and Jacques Emile Blanche at the Académie de la Palette, but was not convinced by the seriousness of the course. The year 1904 saw the creation, with the same friends and Antoine Bourdelle, who taught sculpture classes, of the workshops at the Académie de la Grande Chaumière. Very quickly, Prinet regularly taught painting classes there. His student was the Australian-born artist Bessie Davidson (1879–1965), who produced most of her work in France and was strongly influenced by her time at the Grande Chaumière8. He probably taught there until 1929, when he became a professor at the Beaux-Arts in Paris, where he created and directed the workshop for female artists. He notably had Simone Desprez as a student. He left the Beaux-Arts in 1931, having reached the age limit.

Alongside his teaching, he continued his artistic career and gained notoriety. In 1909, he illustrated La Jeune Fille bien élevée by René Boylesve. Over the course of his career, he would illustrate works by Balzac, Pierre Loti, Anatole France and Henri Bataille; among many others.

In 1913, he was appointed Secretary for the Société Nationale des Beaux-Arts and travelled to the United States; serving on the jury for an exhibition at Carnegie Mellon University.

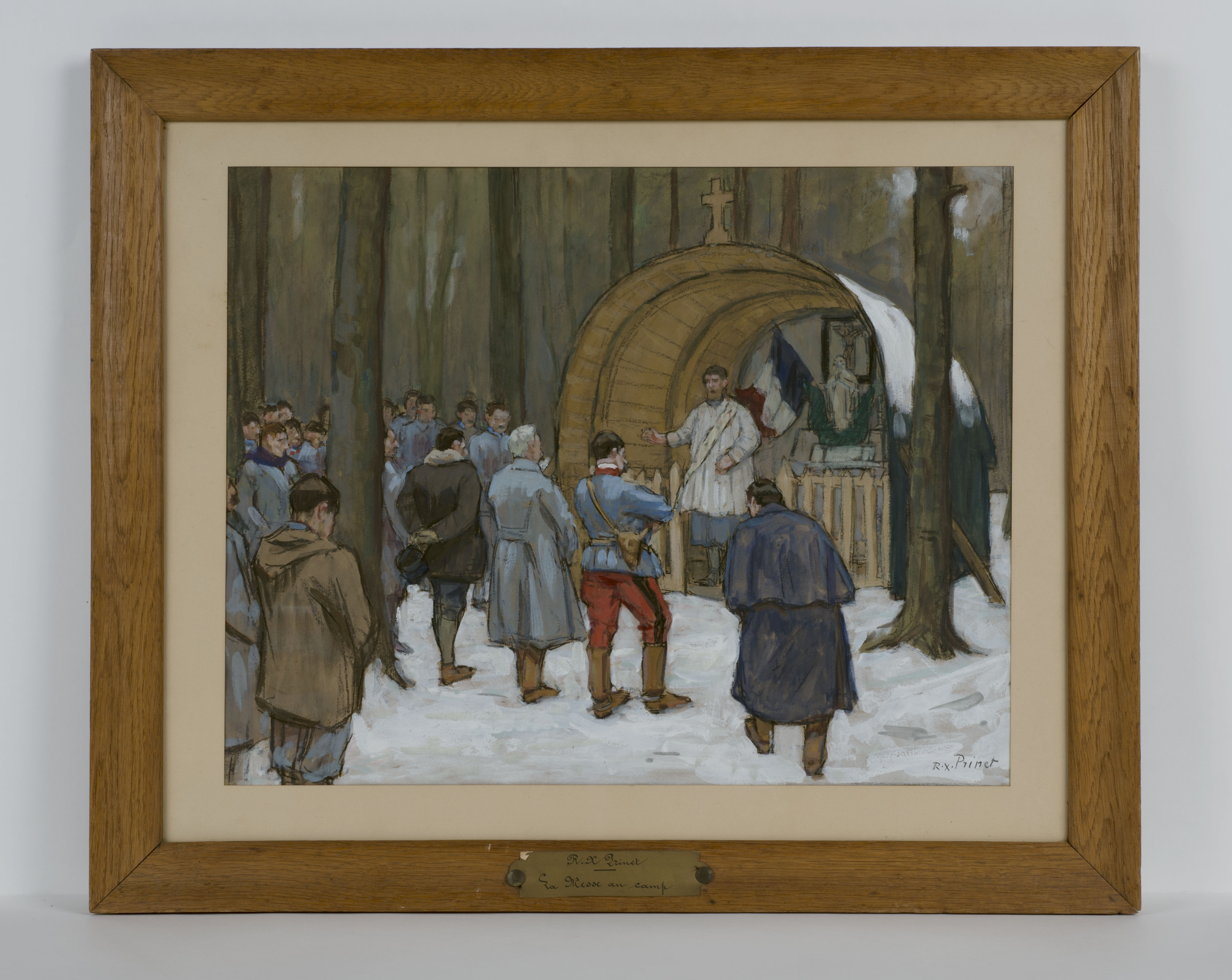
La messe au camp R. (1917), kept à La contemporaine (Nanterre).

Prinet painted the reception of Albert Besnard at the Académie des Beaux-Arts in 1912. In 1916, he painted the artist Félix Desgranges in his family living room in Luxeuil-les-Bains in the company of the Bessie Davidson in a composition entitled Chez Desgranges.

Prinet was too old in 1914 to be mobilized in the army, but the First World War still disrupted his activities and he got involved in the conflict. In 1915 he participated in the 62 illustrations of the National Album of the War, a partly retrospective review of the fighting to which his friends Lucien Simon, Albert Besnard and Emile René Ménard also contributed, as well as painters such as Claude Monet, Auguste Renoir and Édouard Vuillard. This work was an initiative of the Fraternité des Artistes, an association organizing support to mobilized artists and various charitable operations, closely linked to the administration of the Beaux-Arts. Prinet became a member of this committee in 1914 and remained so until 1927. In 1914–1919, he also managed the Puvis de Chavanes canteen for artists, while remaining a member of several artists' societies.

In October 1916, Prinet's involvement in the conflict became more direct and official. The Ministry of War then called on non-mobilized artists as observers with the aim of creating a collection of works of art on the conflict. Prinet was selected for two of these observation missions and his participation in them is definitely proven. His first mission, from March 7 to April 1 of the next year, in which Lucien Simon also was part, was the second one launched by the ministry. He was then assigned to the Vosges army. During the second, from June 1 to 30 of the same year, he was assigned to the Noyon army. The expenses were on him, but for each of his missions the French State purchased some of his works. These were presented at exhibitions bringing together the production of the commissioned artists and were integrated into the War Museum. In addition with his artistic activities, Prinet was also a night watchman in one of the hospitals of the Union of Women of France in 1915–1917.

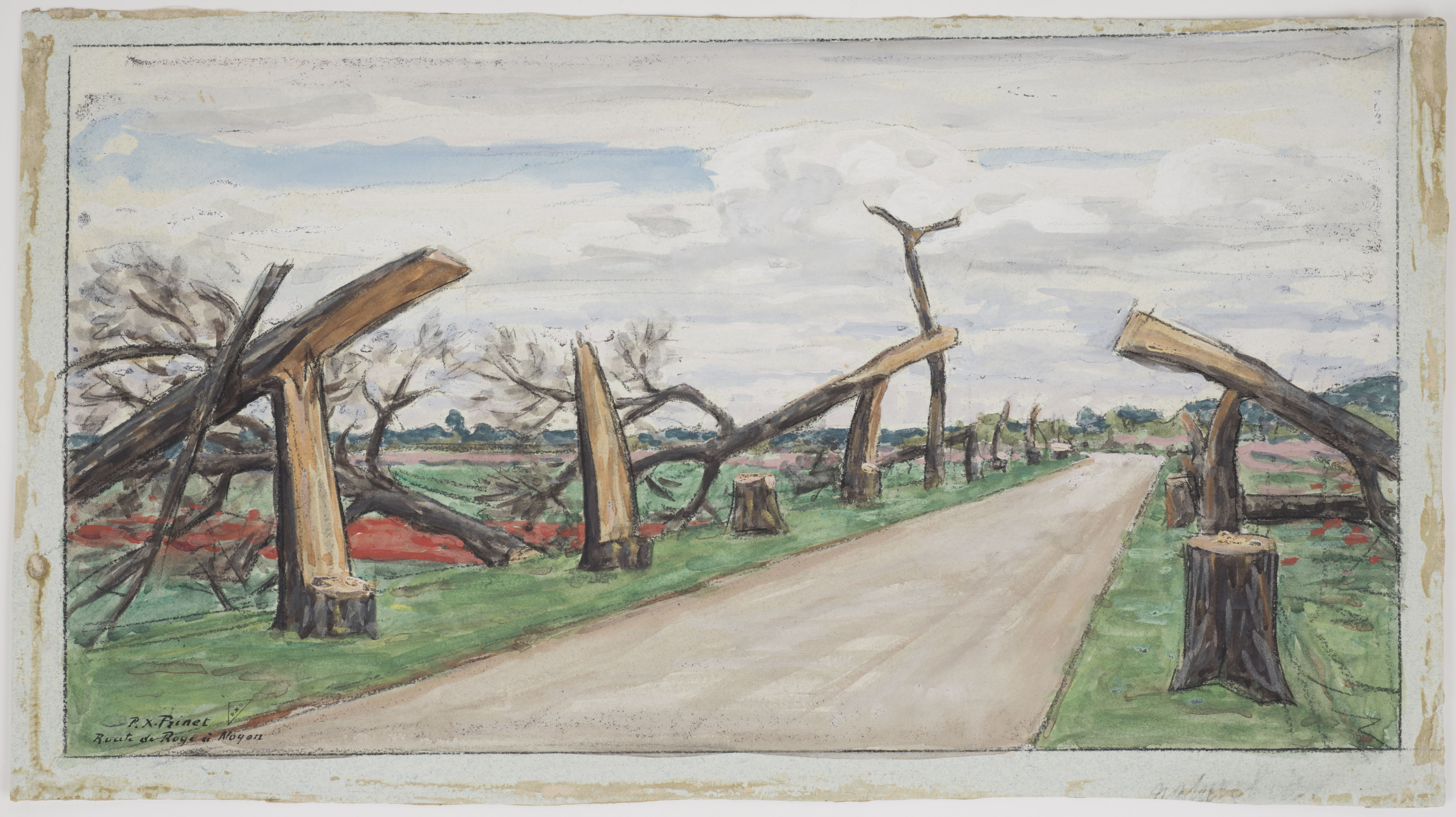
Route de Roye à Noyon : les arbres coupés (1917), kept at La contemporaine (Nanterre).

His last painting on the theme of war, produced after his missions, L'Absoute, is intended to be more symbolic and less descriptive. It was completed in 1919 and exhibited at the Société Nationale des Beaux-Arts.

After the war in 1920, he exhibited with René Ménard, Lucien Simon, Edmond Aman-Jean and Albert Besnard at the first Salon of French Artists in Brussels. The same year, he exhibited again in Pittsburgh at the 21st exhibition. He illustrated Pierre Loti's book Roman d'un Spahi. He joined in the Besnards' "Sundays" on rue Guillaume-Tell, Paris, and in 1922, the sculptor Philippe Besnard asked him to be the godfather of his daughter Anne-Elisabeth.

Six years later, in 1926, the Société Belfortaine des Beaux-Arts was created. It then organized major exhibitions every year until the Second World War at the Belfort museums, in which René-Xavier Prinet participated along with Georges Fréset, Jacques-Émile Blanche, Jean-Eugène Bersier, Raymond Legueult, Anders Osterlind, Henry de Waroquier, and Jules-Émile Zingg. It became one of his favorite exhibition venues.

He also exhibited in Langres alongside Georges Fréset, Jules Adler, and Jules-René Hervé. During this period, he was also very active in several artists' committees and societies, in which he exhibited and, above all, ensured a form of promotion of the arts, such as within the Permanent Committee of French Exhibitions Abroad.

His work was also part of the painting event in the art competition at the 1932 Summer Olympics in Los Angeles.

In 1943, he was elected to the Académie des Beaux-Arts to fill the chair made vacant by the death of Jules-Alexis Muenier in 1942. In addition to painting, he wrote two texts, Initiation à la peinture, in 1935, and Initiation au dessin.

René-Xavier Prinet died in his house in Bourbonne-les-Bains on January 26, 1946. He is buried in the cemetery of this town, with his spouse Jeanne. The two had no children.

== Selected works ==
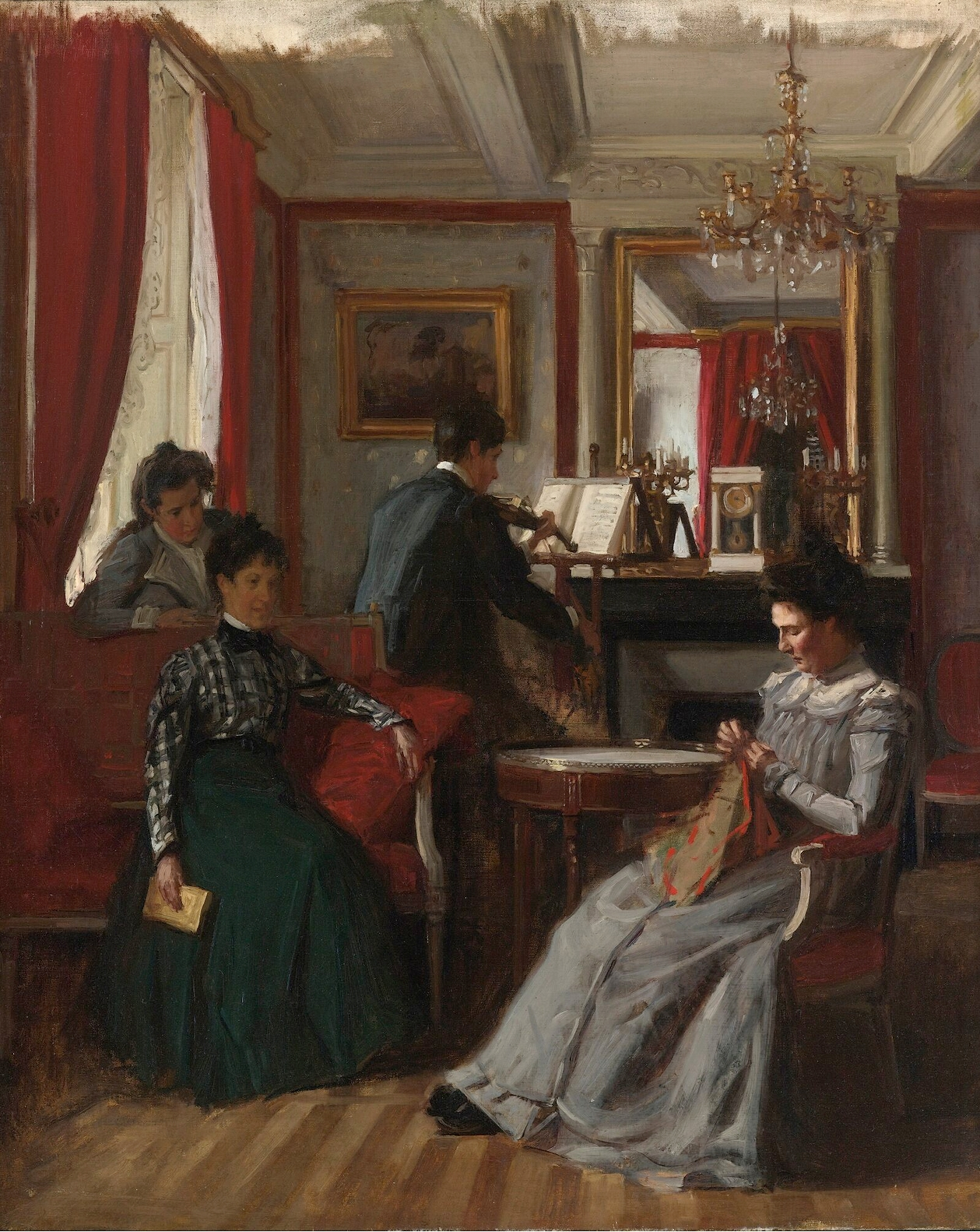
Salon de famille (around 1905), oil on canvas, private collection.

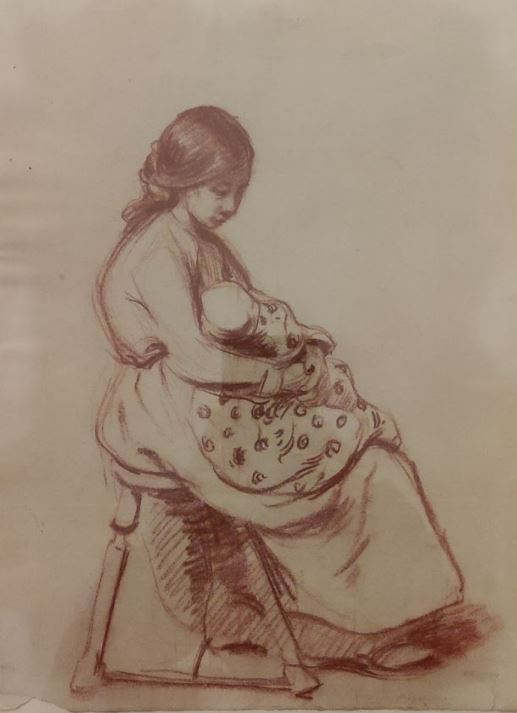
Femme à l'enfant, red chalk drawing, private collection.

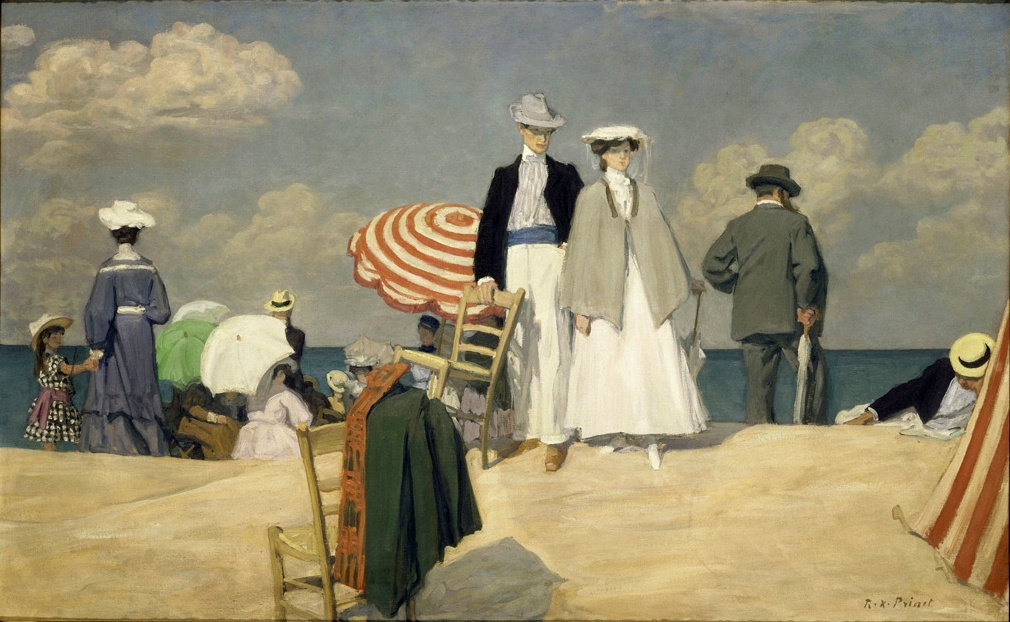
Plage à Cabourg (1896), oil on canvas, musée d'Orsay.

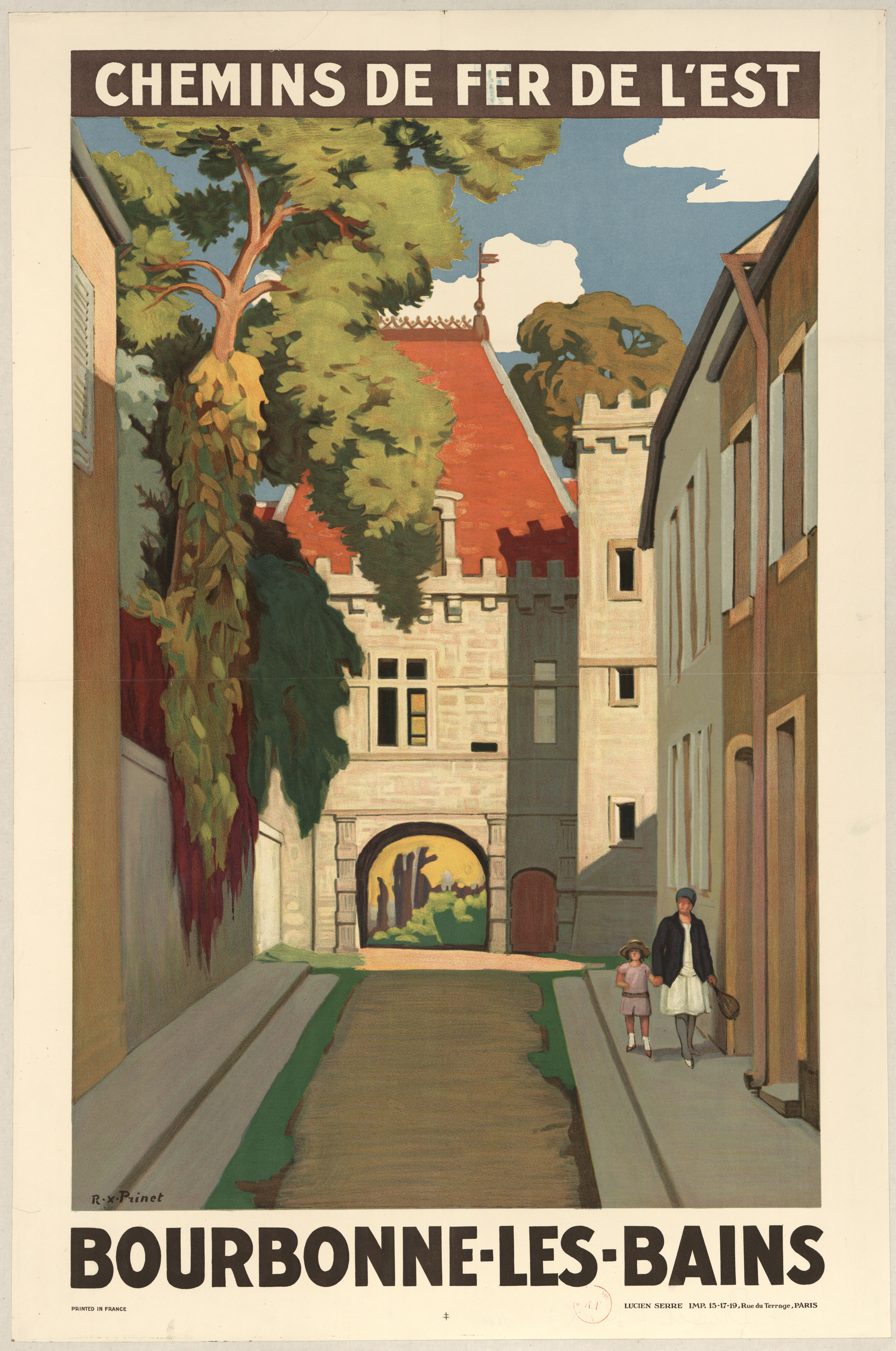
Chemins de Fer de l'Est (1930), poster, Lucien Serre printing house, Paris.

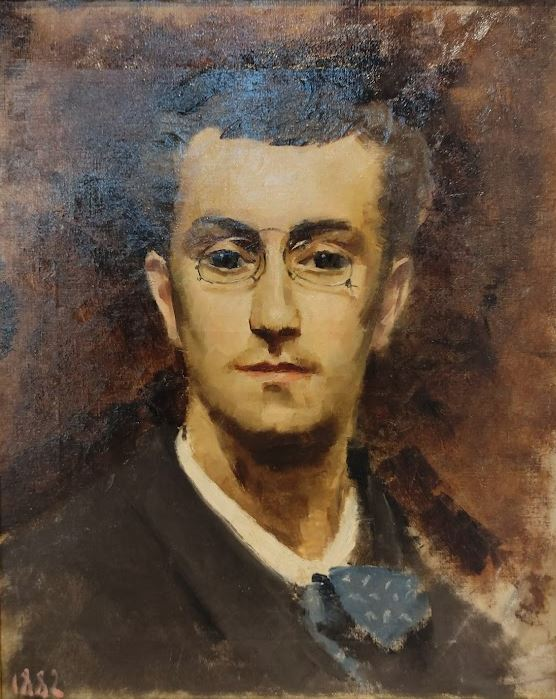
Self-portrait (1882), oil on canvas, musée de Bourbonne-les-Bains.

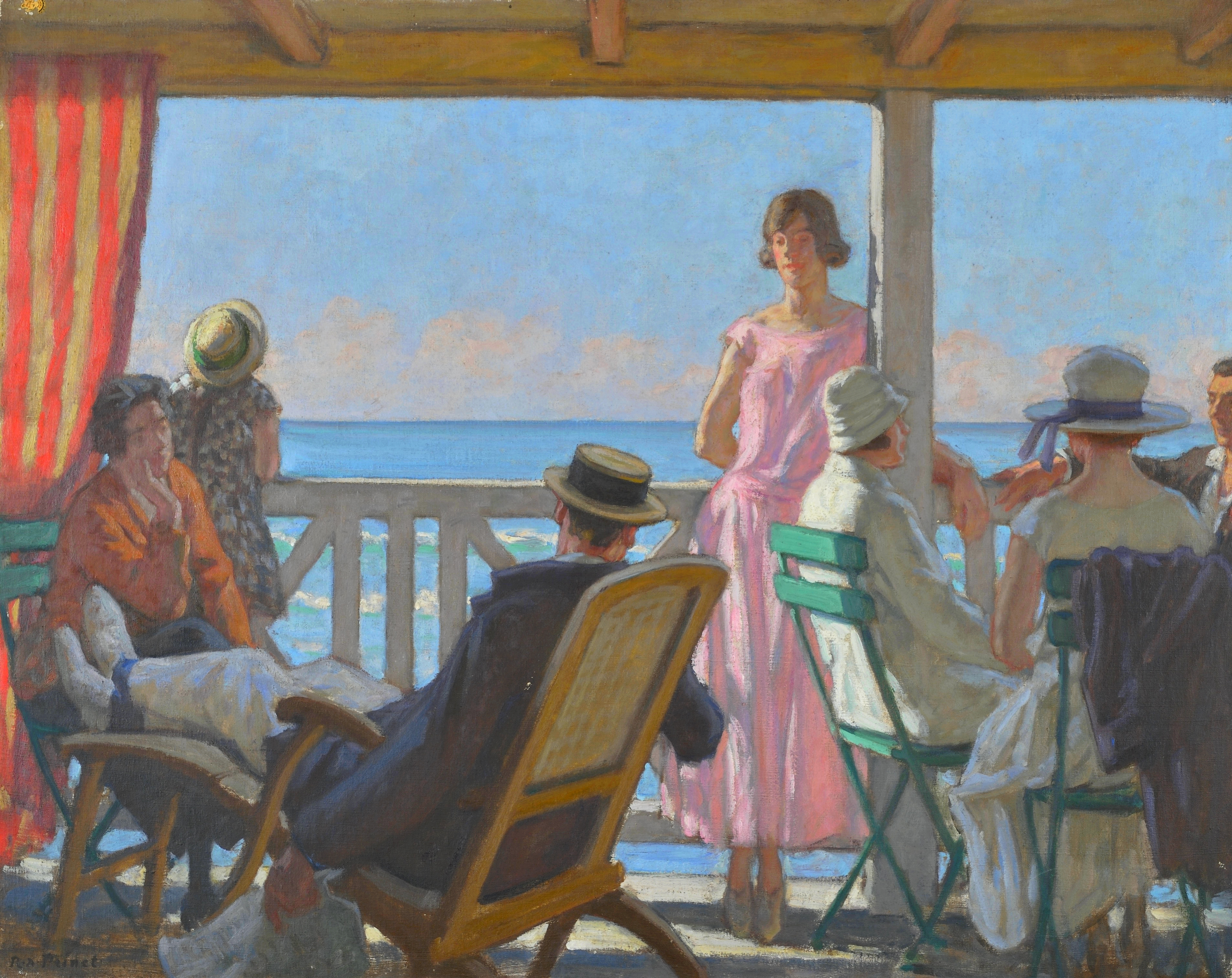
Au bord de la Manche (around 1920), oil on canvas, musée de la Chartreuse de Douai.

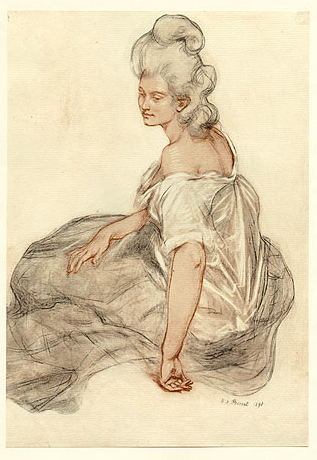
Manon (1897), lithographie.

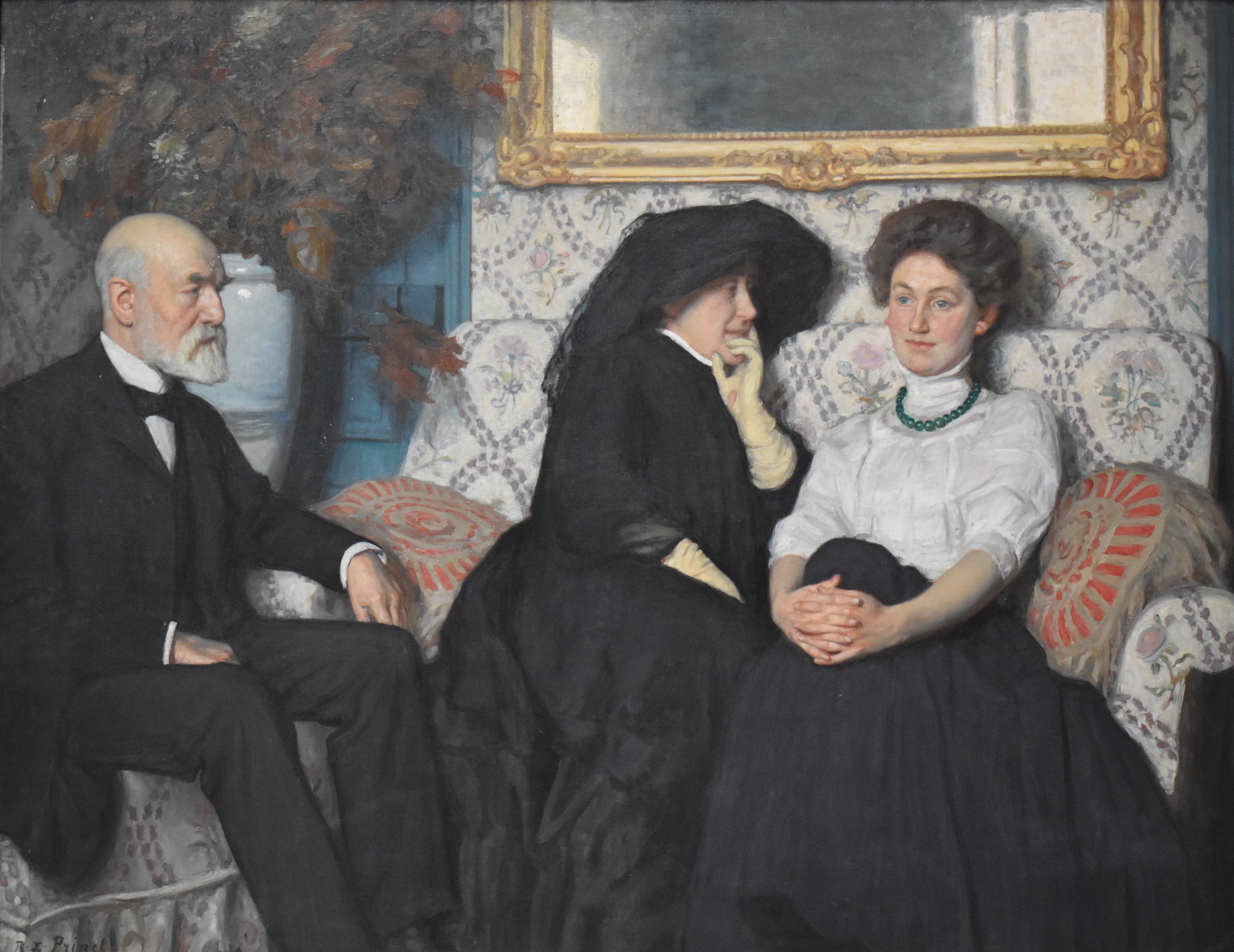
Portrait de la famille_Saglio (before 1908), oil on canvas, musée d'Orsay.

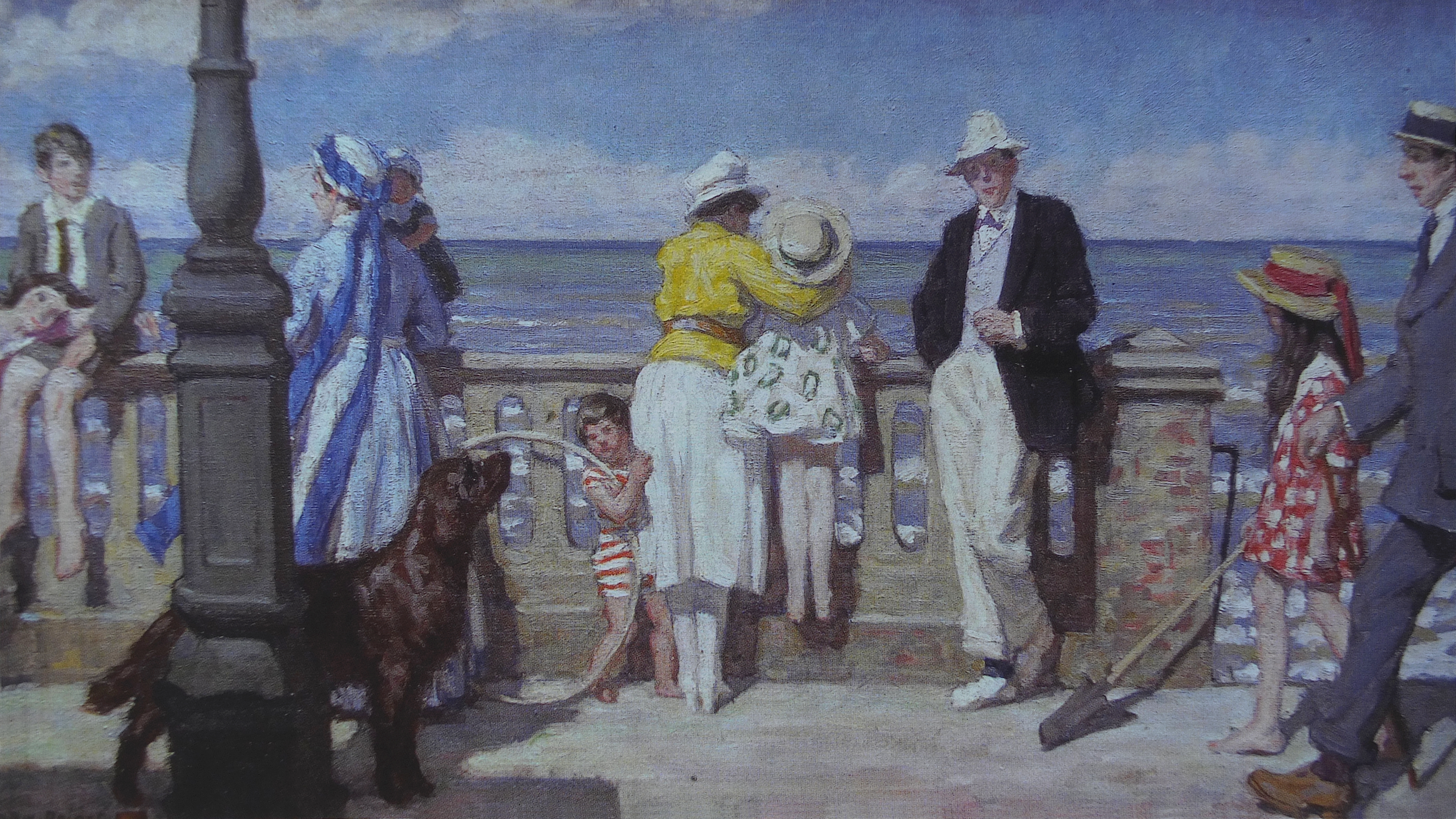
La digue de Cabourg (around 1925), oil on canvas, musée d'art et d'histoire de Belfort.

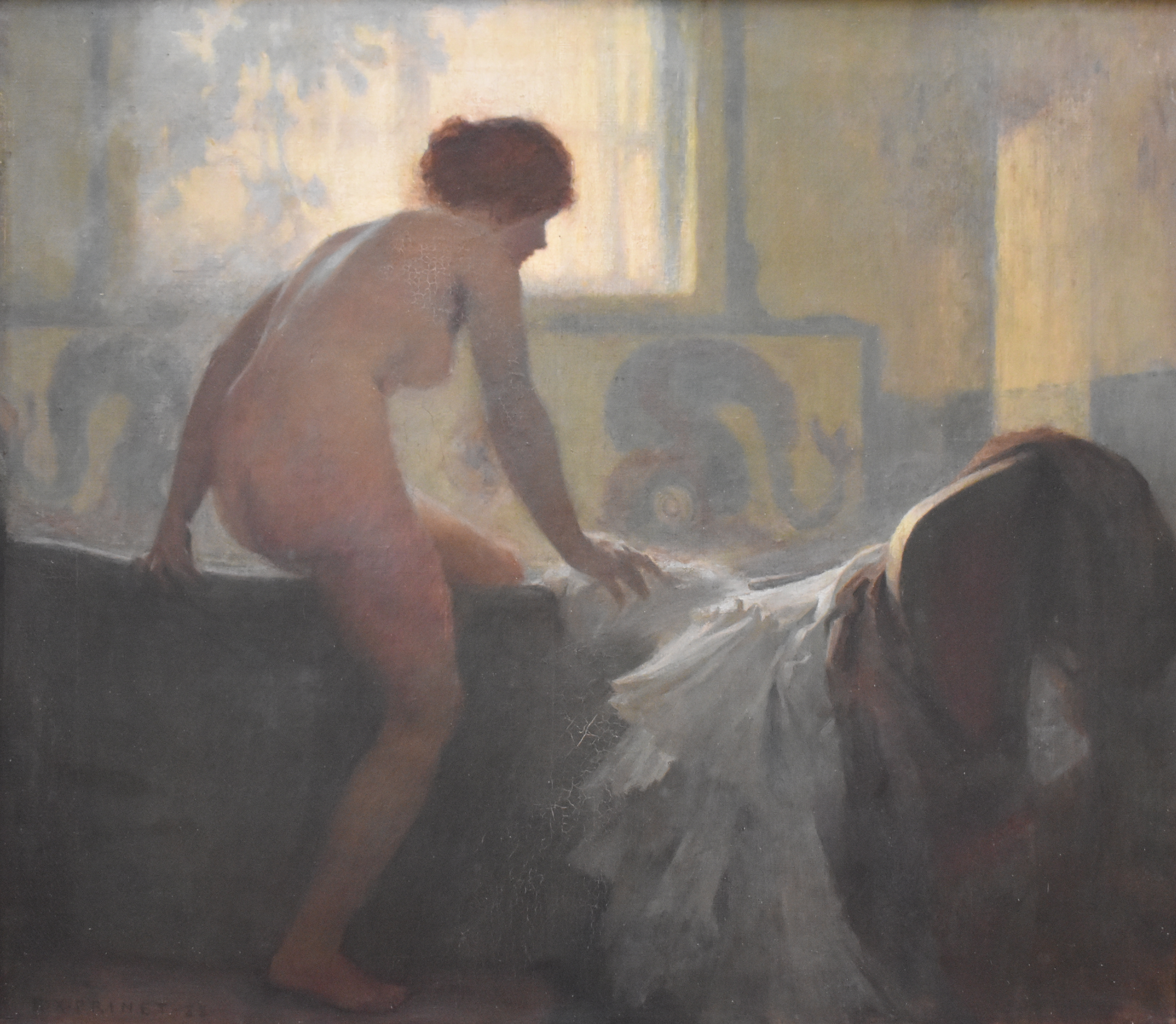
Femme au bain (1888), oil on canvas, musée Petiet de Limoux.

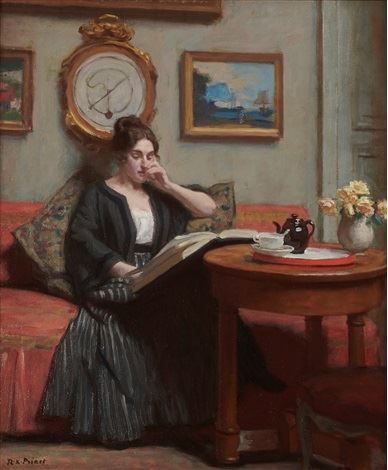
Jeune femme à la lecture (before 1938), oil on canvas, private collection.

== Exhibitions ==
- 1885 : Salon des artistes français where he presented his work Jésus Enfant. He exhibited his work there until 1889.
- 1890 : Public show of the Société nationale des beaux-arts, where he exhibited until 1922.
- 1891 : Durand-Ruel gallery, Paris.
- 1897 : Exhibition of painters from Franche-Comté in the Durand-Ruel gallery, Paris.
- 1900 : The ten-year Exposition Universelle (1900) of Paris.
- 1901 :
  - La Sonate à Kreutzer, « L'Art français contemporain » by the Württembergischer Kunstverein in Stuttgart;
  - La Convalescence et la Chambre blanche, Carnegie Museums of Pittsburgh;
  - La Partie de tric-trac and La Femme à la rose, International art exhibition in Dresden;
  - Entre amies, Venice Biennale.
- 1902 : La Partie de tric-trac, Karlsruhe.
- 1906 : Salon Gris and La Salle à manger, French art exhibition in Strasbourg.
- 1909 :
  - Sur la plage, French art exhibition in Montreal;
  - Entre amies, Société royale of Brussels.
- 1911 :
  - Exhibition and sale of the Monastère de Saint François d'Assise at the International art exhibition in Rome;
  - Les Amazones and Le Passeur, 17st exhibition of the Carnegie Museums of Pittsburgh and at the Buffalo Art Academy.
- 1912 : A set of pieces from Prinet is presented at the modern artists show of Antwerp.
- 1913 : 17st exhibition of the Carnegie Museums of Pittsburgh, with Les Cavaliers and Intérieur de salle à manger.
- 1914 : L'Écrivain, 18st exhibition of Pittsburgh.
- 1920 :
  - Collective exhibition with Ménard, Simon, Aman-Jean et Besnard at the first Salon des artistes français in Brussels;
  - Musique de chambre, 21st exhibition of Pittsburgh.
- La Toilette, Public Art Galleries in Brighton.
- 1926;
  - Exhibition with André Dauchez at the Georges Petit's gallery in Paris;
  - La Bibliothèque, 24th exhibition of Pittsburgh.
- 1929 :
  - La Réprimande, French pavilion at the Venice Biennale;
  - Exhibition with Émile-René Ménard at the French artists gallery in Brussels.
- 1937 : He exhibited at the first Salon national indépendant created by André Dauchez.
- 1938 :
  - Four paintings au Salon national indépendant, Paris;
  - Four works au Salon des Tuileries, Paris.
- 1940 :
  - One painting at the Salon national indépendant, Paris;
  - Two paintings et the Salon des Tuileries, Paris.
- 1941 : Four painting at the Salon des Tuileries, Paris.
- 1942 : Six painting at the Salon des Tuileries, Paris.
- 1944 : Two paintings at the Salon des Tuileries, Paris.
- 1948 : Retrospective au palais de Tokyo du "Groupe d'Amis" : Aman-Jean, Besnard, Denis, Ménard, Simon et Prinet (deux toiles).
- 1986 : Special retrospectives at the Belfort and Vesoul museums and at the musée Bourdelle in Paris.
- 2019 : Exhibition "Les derniers impressionnistes, le temps d'intimité" in Quimper.
- 2022 :
  - A work at the exhibit "Marcel Proust, un romain parisien" au musée Carnavalet;
  - A painting at the exhibit "Marcel Proust, la fabrique de l'oeuvre" à la Bibliothèque nationale de France;
  - One oil on canvas at the exhibit "Marcel Proust, du côté de la mère" au Musée d'Art et d'Histoire du Judaïsme.

== His work in public collections ==
In the United States

- Boston : Manon.

In Finland

- Helsinki : Au coin du feu.

In France

- Belfort (Territoire de)
  - La Digue de Cabourg;
  - La Plage à Cabourg;
  - Le pique-nique.
- Bordeaux : L'Envolée.
- Bourbonne-les-Bains (Haute-Marne), town museum :
  - La terrasse et les cyprès de la villa d'Este à Tivoli;
  - Le déjeuner sur l'herbe (sur la route de Coiffy);
  - La maison de l'artiste à Bourbonne-les-Bains;
  - La visite à la Grande Tante;
  - Portrait de René Jaquemin.
- Cabourg, Villa du Temps retrouvé : La Plage de Cabourg, vers 1910.
- Caen, musée des Beaux-Arts : Le Balcon.
- Douai, musée de la Chartreuse : Bord de la Manche.
- Gray (Haute-Saône) :
  - La Leçon de danse;
  - La leçon de guitare, huile sur toile, 135 x 137 cm.
- Luxeuil-les-Bains (Haute-Saône).
- Nanterre, La contemporaine:
  - Défilé d'artillerie à Pont-L'évêque;
  - Route de Roye à Noyon: les arbres coupés;
  - La messe au camp R.;
  - Copie d'une peinture murale exécutée par un soldat allemand.
- Paris :
  - Palais de la Légion d'honneur : Les Quatre saisons.
  - Musée d'Orsay :
    - La Plage de Cabourg;
    - La Famille Saglio;
    - Assise;
    - L'Élève;
    - Le Bain.
- Roubaix, La Piscine Museum.
- Vesoul (Haute-Saône), musée Georges-Garret :
  - Le Réfectoire de Morey;
  - La Bibliothèque;
  - L’ombrelle rayée sur la plage.

In the United Kingdom

- Stourhead : Femmes sur la plage de Deauville.
