= Jules-Alexis Muenier =

French painter and photographer (1863–1942)

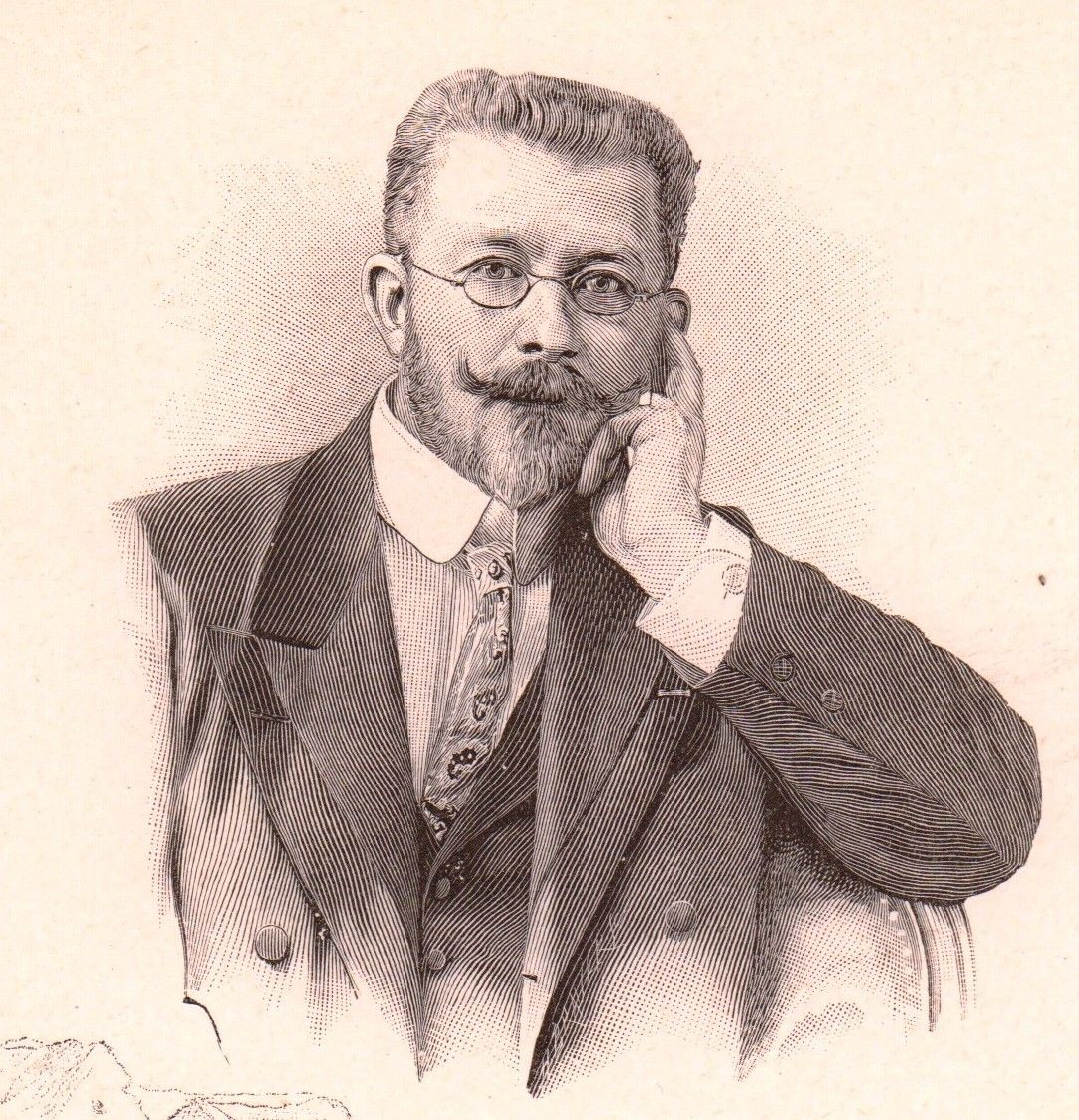
- Jules-Alexis Muenier
- Born: 29 November 1863; Vesoul, Haute-Saône, Second French Empire
- Died: 17 December 1942 (aged 79); Paris, Vichy France
- Education: École nationale supérieure des Beaux-Arts

Jules-Alexis Muenier (French pronunciation: [ʒylz‿alɛksi mɥənje]; 29 November 1863 – 17 December 1942) was a French painter and photographer.

== Biography ==
In 1880, Jules-Alexis Muenier entered the École nationale supérieure des Beaux-Arts where he studied under Jean-Léon Gérôme, now considered one of the most important academic painters of his age. In the latter half of that same decade Muenier began exhibiting his work, first at the Paris Salon with the painting Le Bréviaire, which brought him much acclaim. In 1891, he exhibited The Catechism Lesson which brought recognition from the government, which eventually purchased his work.

Many of his works depict his native Haute-Saône, where he lived most of his life. He received the Chevalier de la Légion d'honneur in 1895 and became a member of Académie des Beaux-Arts in 1921. He was a close friend of fellow realist painter Pascal Dagnan-Bouveret.

== Gallery ==
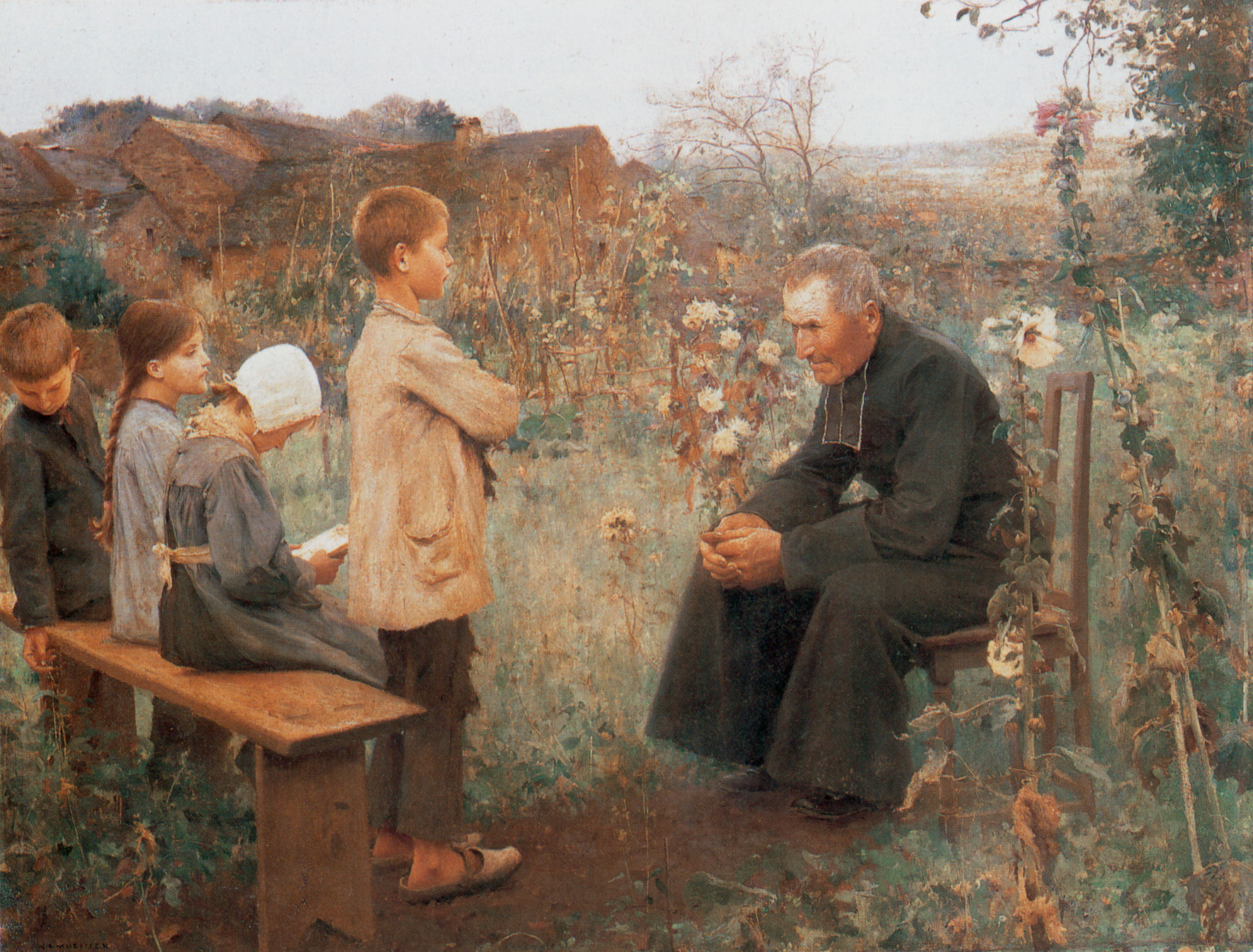
The Catechism Lesson

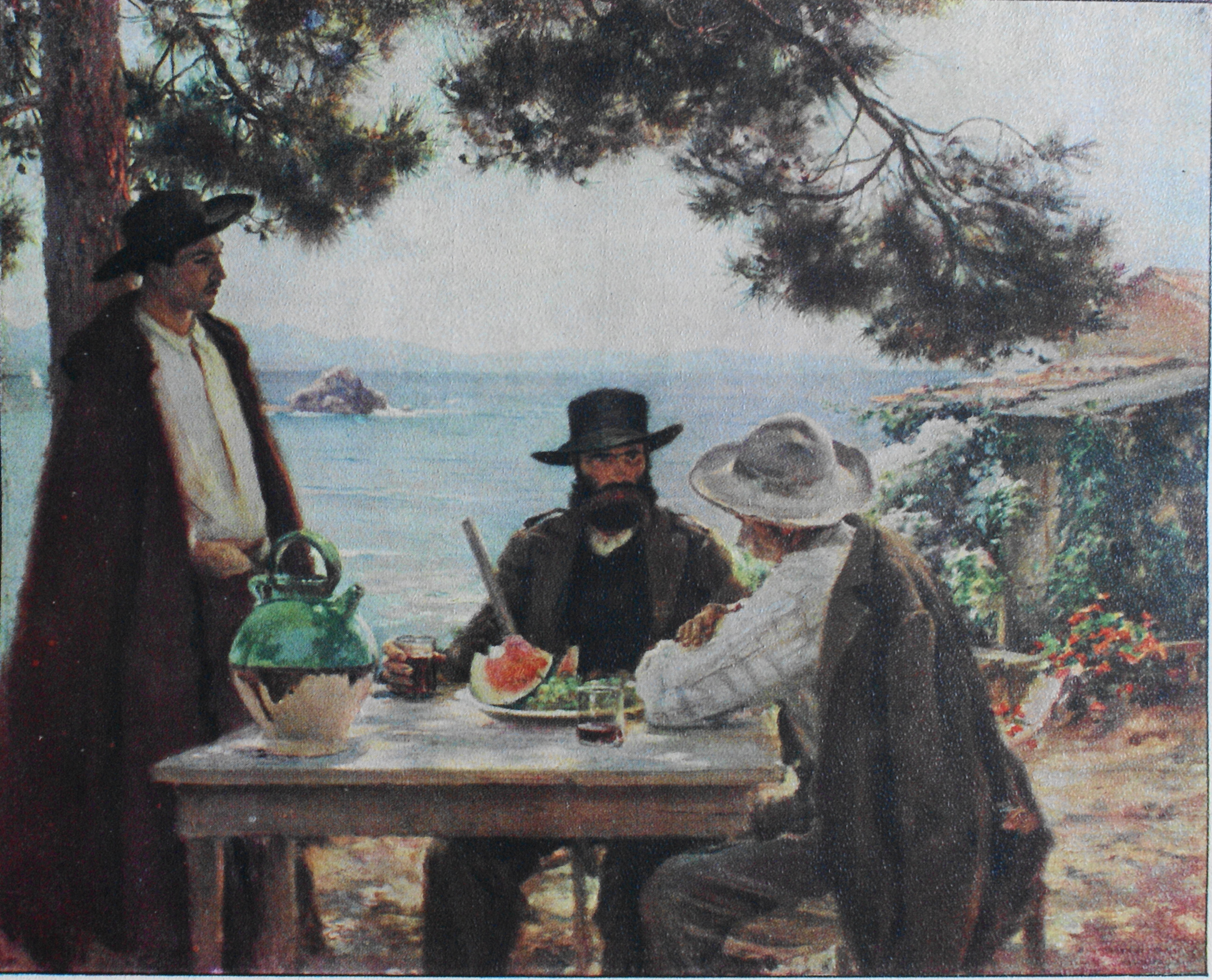
Drinkers, route des Sanguinaire

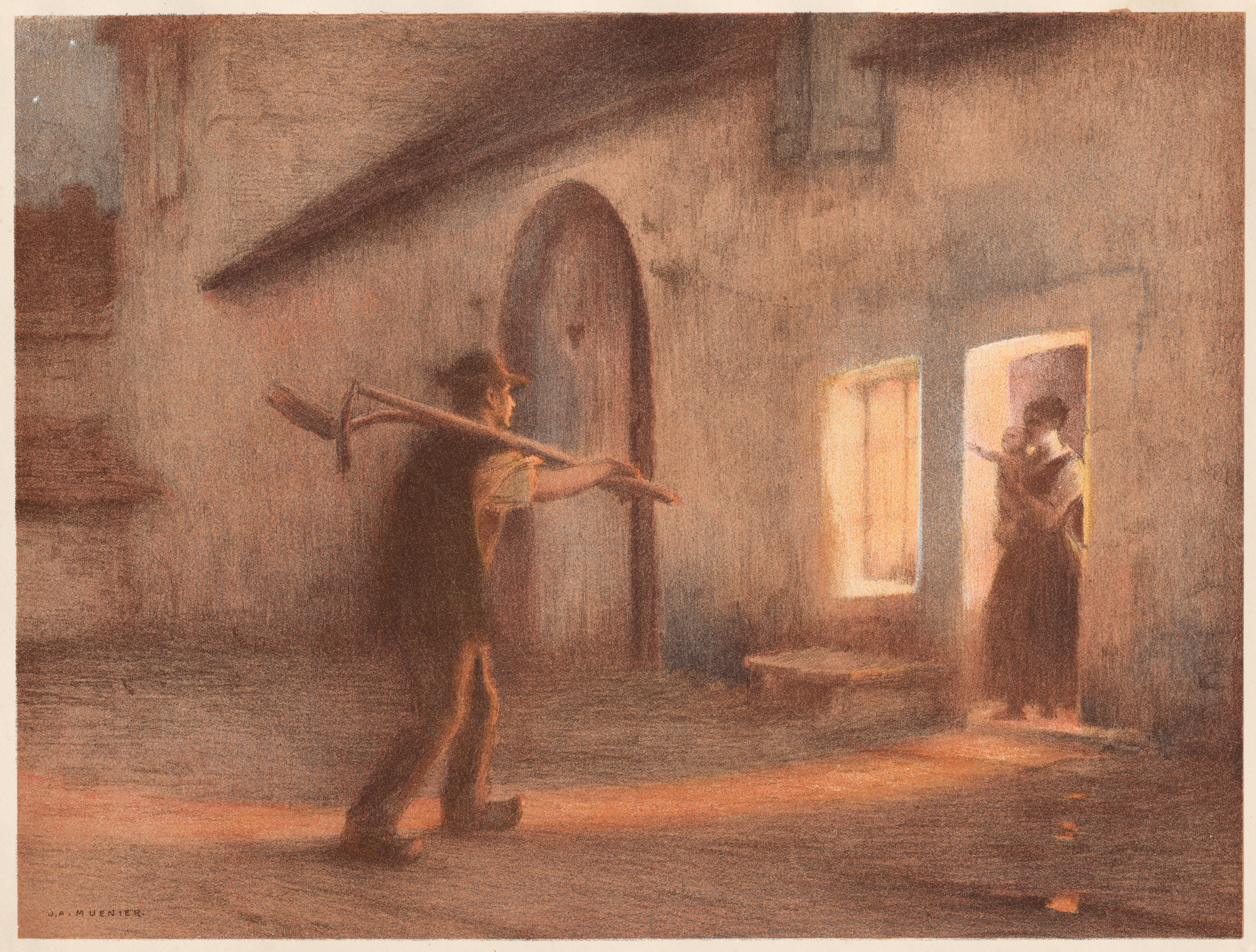
Return from the Fields

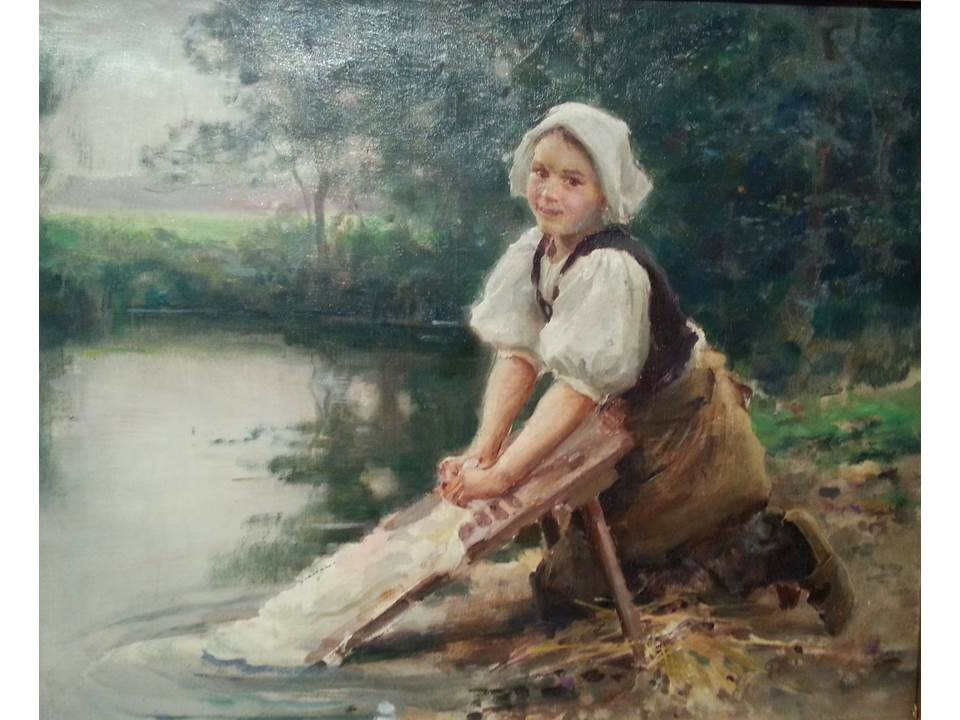
The Young Washerwoman
