= Rose Wagner Performing Arts Center =

Arts complex in Salt Lake City

Coordinates: 40.76313°N 111.89576°W

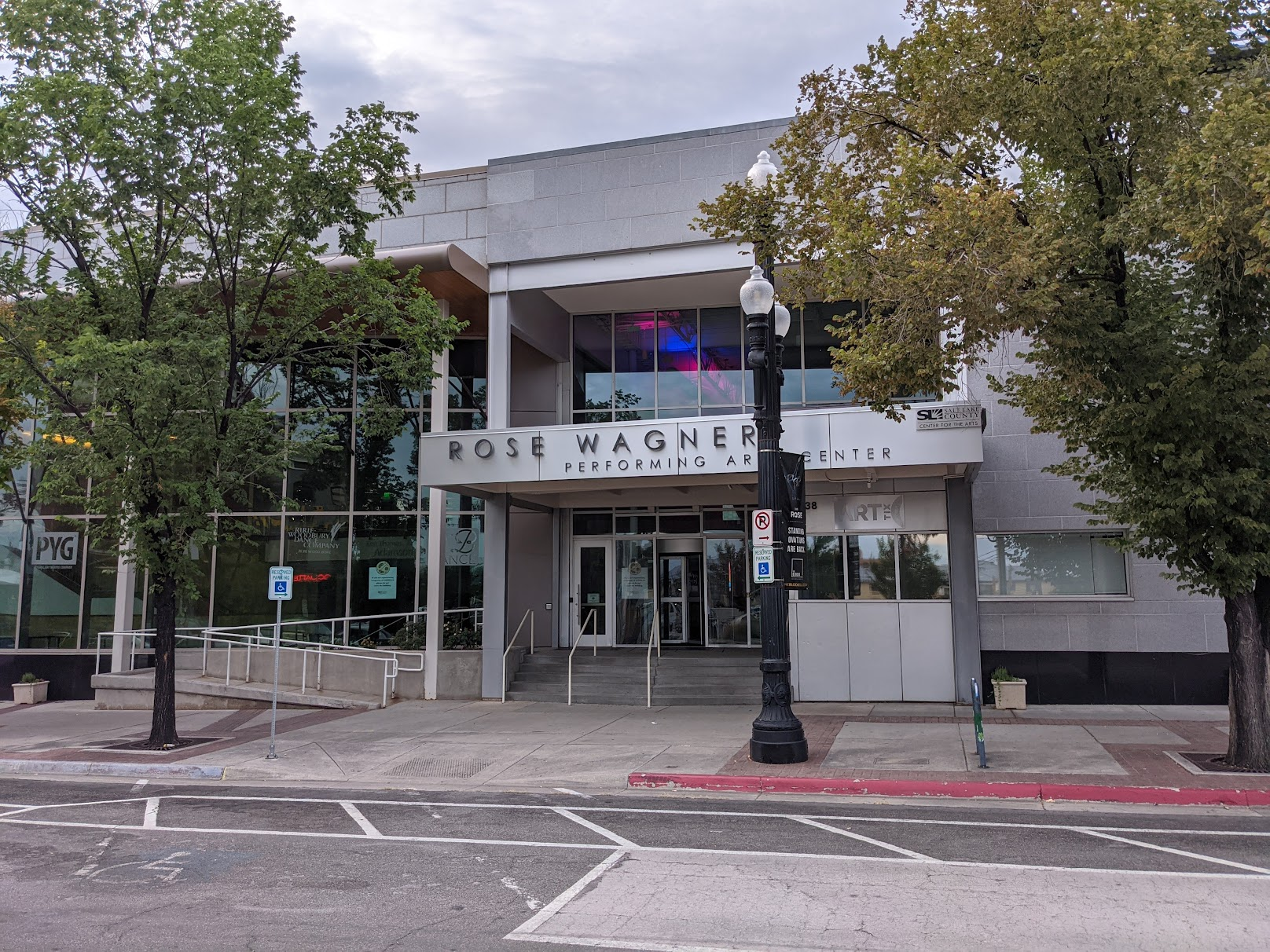
- Interactive map of Rose Wagner Performing Arts Center
- Address: 138 West 300 South; Salt Lake City; United States
- Owner: Salt Lake County Center for the Arts
- Capacity: Jeanne Wagner Theatre: 501; Leona Wagner Black Box Theatre: 191; Studio Theatre: 75
- Type: performing arts centre
- Current use: Concert Hall

Construction
- Opened: 1997

Website
- www.arttix.org

The Rose Wagner Performing Arts Center is a three-venue arts complex in downtown Salt Lake City, Utah that is home to various performing arts organizations, such as Ririe-Woodbury Dance Company, the Gina Bachauer International Piano Foundation, Plan-B Theatre Company, and the Sundance Film Festival. It is part of the Salt Lake County Center for the Arts.

The center contains 3 separate performance spaces:

- The Jeanne Wagner Theatre: a 501-seat proscenium theater with one balcony.
- The Leona Wagner Theatre: a 191-seat black box theater.
- A small, configurable Studio Theatre for up to 75 audience members.

In addition to theaters, the center has 4 dance studios and hosts both permanent and rotating art installations.

== History ==
The center was opened in 1997. During the 2002 Winter Olympics, the venue was used for the Cultural Olympiad Arts festival and was booked as the location of live tapings and broadcasts of The Tonight Show with Jay Leno this was eventually cancelled prior to any filming.
