= Plan-B Theatre Company =

Plan-B Theatre is the smallest fully professional theatre company in Salt Lake City, Utah. Plan-B develops and produces unique and socially conscious theatre created by Utah playwrights, and is a resident company at the Rose Wagner Performing Arts Center. In fact, The Dramatists Guild of America has noted that Plan-B is the only professional theatre company in the United States producing full seasons of new work by local playwrights.

== History ==
The company was founded in 1991 and incorporated in 1995 in Salt Lake City, Utah.

In response to COVID-19, Plan-B shifted its 30th anniversary season to a completely virtual one, producing an entire season of audio drama.

Plan-B has produced nearly 100 world premieres, including Utah’s first by an Asian American playwright, first by an African American playwright, first by a Latina playwright, and first by a Persian playwright.

- Plan-B Theatre
- QSaltLake: 25 Years of Plan-B
- City Weekly: A 25-Year Retrospective
- SLUG Magazine: Serious Entertainment: Plan-B Celebrates 20 Years of Socially Conscious Theatre
