= Edmond-Édouard Lapeyre =

French painter and illustrator (1880–1960)

- Born: 17 November 1880; Reims, France
- Died: 4 February 1960 (aged 79); Paris, France
- Known for: Painting

Edmond-Édouard Lapeyre (17 November 1880 in Reims – 4 February 1960 in Paris), was a French painter and illustrator.

== Biography ==
Born in Reims on 17 November 1880, Edmond-Édouard Lapeyre joined the atelier of Fernand Cormon to complete his artistic education. In 1888 Cormon moved to 104 boulevard de Clichy, where Lapeyre’s fellow students included Jacques Villon and Henri Matisse. Some time before 1907 Lapeyre moved into the area, living in rue Lepic, close by. When Cormon went to teach at the École des Beaux-Arts in 1897, Lapeyre continued to study with Paul-Émile Boutigny and Albert-François Larteau (1870–?). These were two academic painters who, even after 1900, continued to ply the Salon des Artistes Français with the kind of genre and battlescenes in the historicist style that had been popular in the 19th century.

=== Diversity of subjects ===
Lapeyre’s early envois to the Salon were eclectic. Alongside paintings of picturesque and Orientalist subjects, such as Avant le bal, a work perfectly in harmony with the canons of the Belle Époque, at the 1912 Salon he exhibited Les femmes de Sparte à Aeglia, an ambitious history painting that revived grand mythological themes. Between these two extremes, Lapeyre exhibited genre scenes depicting the leisure pursuits of Parisian high society – a boxing match in the Salle Wagram, and the Saint-Cloud racetrack. His elegant Portrait d’Anna de Noailles aux courses illustrates his twofold talent as a portraitist and chronicler of society life – qualities shared by other exhibitors such as Jean Béraud and Henri Gervex.

=== Lapeyre's landscapes ===
Landscape featured among Edmond-Édouard Lapeyre’s Salon paintings on two occasions: the first time in 1909, with En patrouille, and a second in 1914, with La rentrée des gerbes. Here, rather than the kind of dark Naturalism found in Victor-Ferdinand Bourgeois' paintings, we find a sunny social realism in which farm workers are shown making their way back to the farm, their pitchforks over their shoulders.

This essential difference of temperament makes Lapeyre closer to the verism of the Italian Macchiaioli than to that of his fellow French artists, even if the latter had distanced themselves from the Naturalism of Zola’s day. The serenity of the weather and generosity of nature in Lapeyre’s work, and that of Gaston Balande and Henri-Alexandre Sollier, are in contrast to the bleakness of his French contemporaries.

=== Lapeyre, seaside painter ===
After 1906 most of the numerous studies of landscapes and monuments made by the artist between these years and the 1920s are dated and give the location, and it is therefore possible to trace the route that took him to the Ardennes, Biarritz, Ardes-sur-Couze (Auvergne) and, above all, Saint-Georges-de-Didonne (Charente-Maritime), a small coastal town where he first stayed in 1909, and where he painted his first beach scenes, featuring the dunes. From the 1920s tourists began to appear in his compositions, captured on the beach at nearby Royan and then at Vallières.

After Trouville and the coastal resorts of Normandy, the beaches of Charente-Maritime became increasingly popular with French holidaymakers. There, from 1921 and 1935, Lapeyre sketched rocks, people with their boats, and young women who posed for him.

Lapeyre met his models in the studios of the milliners for whom he designed posters and signs in a simplified graphic style typical of French illustration at the time (although also recalling the bold forms of the Beggarstaff Brothers in England). With their lustrous finishes, his portraits of models were similar to those by John Singer Sargent and Joaquín Sorolla. Their portraits of fashionable European women also illustrate the development of a society of leisure, for which the beaches of France and Spain provided a playground, but one where elegance was still de rigueur. The work by Sorolla that perhaps most exemplifies this is Promenade by the Sea, painted in Biarritz in 1909.

=== Travels ===
Every year, from July to September, Lapeyre used to escape from his urban, Parisian existence. In 1931, for example, he was at Péréyrol in the Dordogne, and in 1935 in the Vendeix valley near La Bourboule, which inspired many delicate, lush landscapes. In the following decade he painted in Argentan (1941), at Saint Honoré in the Orne (1945), in the Nièvre, and at Vic-sur-Cère in Cantal (1947), returning here with his wife, Madeleine Charlot, in June 1950. Vue depuis notre chambre depicts this holiday. This image from the end of a full career, a window at Vic open onto both the street and the surrounding countryside, seems to encapsulate the artist’s productive and felicitously cultivated duality as a painter of both fashionable women and country folk. Edmond-Édouard Lapeyre died in Paris on 4 February 1960.

== Works in public institutions ==
- Portrait d'Anna de Noailles aux courses, 1909. Musée Carnavalet, Paris.

== Exhibitions ==
(non-exhaustive list)

- French Naturalist Painters 1890-1950 - 12 June - 7 July 2012, The Fleming Collection, London
