= Henri-Alexandre Sollier =

French painter

- Born: 7 December 1896; Bagnolet, France
- Died: 1966 (aged 70); Paris, France
- Known for: Painting

Henri-Alexandre Sollier (born 1896 in Bagnolet, died 1966 in Paris), was a French painter and illustrator.

== Biography ==
Entering the Académie Julian in 1906, painter, draughtsman and lithographer Henri Sollier, born in Bagnolet, near Paris, on 7 December 1886, graduated to the École des Beaux-Arts in 1908, and worked in the ateliers of François Flameng, and, after 1910, of François Schommer. In spring 1919 he celebrated the victory of the Allies with two eloquently titled paintings, Pour elle! and Par elle !, which he exhibited at the Devambez Gallery in Paris. After the interruption of the First World War a fruitful decade ensued of prizes and awards, enabling him to undertake extensive travels.

=== Trip to Senegal ===
In 1920 his first participation at the Salon des Artistes Français achieved a Mention Honorable, together with the Académie des Beaux-Arts Prix Leclercq-Maria Bouland; the following year the Prix de l’Afrique Occidentale Française brought him a travel grant. Sollier set off immediately for French West Africa, to spend three years in Senegal, sending portraits of indigenous peoples – Wolof and Bambara women – to the Pavillon de Marsan and the Salon des Artistes Français, and colourful and exotic market scenes from Dakar. From these bustling centres of trade Sollier brought back portraits of merchants from neighbouring lands, such as the Maure au chapelet, submitted to the 1923 Salon.

=== Between exoticism and regionalism ===
On return in 1924 Sollier reserved his African canvases for his regular admirers at the Salon des Artistes Français, while at the Salon d’Automne, as a newcomer, he presented two paintings in settings more familiar to the public: Les tilleuls and Le porche de Chartres. The painter cultivated two themes, the exotic and the regional, at least until 1935, regularly exhibiting canvases inspired by Africa at the Salon de la Société Coloniale des Artistes Français. One of these recalls his secondary activity as an illustrator, exemplified in his poster design for the 1925 Exposition Agricole in Dakar and Saint-Louis. Ten years later Sollier took part in the first Salon de la France d’Outre-Mer (Salon of French Overseas Territories, Paris, Grand-Palais), and in a group show organised in Brussels by the Société Coloniale des Artistes Français. The year 1929 marked Sollier's discovery of Brittany: a stay in Douarnenez, Finistère, won this Africa specialist's heart: the landscapes and deeply traditional people of Brittany offered a different kind of exoticism from his African sojourn.

=== Joining the Naturalist painting ===
Sollier did more than just capture the picturesque motifs found in the landscapes of Brittany; he also painted realistic portraits of its inhabitants. In Solitude, winner of a silver medal at the 1930 Salon, Sollier demonstrated his conversion to the naturalist style of the day. His uncompromising portraits of a Breton women echo the social realism of Jules Adler, whose academy Sollier frequented in parallel to his courses at the École des Beaux-Arts. In the 1934 Salon Les aïeux won a gold medal. The composition's compact organisation intensifies the frontal dialogue between the protagonists, who bear a certain family resemblance to the kin of Jean-le-Boiteux, a peasant from Plougasnou (Finistère) portrayed by Jean-François Raffaëlli in 1876. The coppery skin tones and broad brushstrokes that convey the humble condition of Sollier's Aïeux are close to the manner of his contemporary Lucien Simon. Simon's work focused on the Bigouden area of Brittany and showed a strong ethnographic content, as in Procession à Penmar’ch. Taking up the mantle of Courbet’s realism, Lucien Simon and his fellow artists popularised Breton subjects in Paris at the turn of the century.

=== Sollier in Brittany ===
In 1933 he went to Bénodet and Sainte-Marine, where Simon continued to paint at the top of the semaphore tower he had been using as a studio since 1902. So had another former member of the Bande noire, André Dauchez, whose views of Finistère are close to Sollier's landscapes from the same period. The two artists evince a similar approach to light, sometimes intense, sometimes muted, following variations in the weather. However, Sollier was often more subtle than his older colleague, and his Brittany landscapes from the 1930s are noteworthy for the delicacy of their unusual pastel effects. From Sainte-Marine, Sollier pushed on to Cornouaille, stopping at Pont-l'Abbé, Loctudy, Lesconil and Penmarc’h, where Lucien Simon painted his Procession. In 1935 Sollier went north to Camaret-sur-Mer, a small fishing port on the Crozon peninsula. The place had been popular with painters ever since Eugène Boudin’s repeated visits there between 1874 and 1880. Among them, Charles Cottet and Georges Lacombe left strongly contrasting representations of the site. Sollier's painting of the rocks at Camaret are a long way from Lacombe's symbolist vision.

=== Towards new horizons ===
Finistère was Sollier's favourite part of Brittany, but he also spent time in the Morbihan and along the Côtes d’Armor. There he painted scenes of everyday life, which he exhibited regularly at the Salon des Artistes Français. This longstanding fidelity was rewarded by the success of his Brittany paintings both with the public and with the judges at the Salon, who awarded him a gold medal at the Exposition Internationale des Arts et Techniques (Paris) in 1937. That same year Sollier was made a committee and jury member of the Salon des Artistes Français, a distinction to match the degree of his public and official recognition.

During the 1940s, without leaving Brittany, Sollier began to explore new genres and new places. He twice tried mythological painting, immediately winning the Prix James Bertrand for his Hommage à Phidias at the 1944 Salon. The following year he returned to this genre with Naissance d’Aphrodite. This departure from his Breton repertoire was continued by landscapes from the Seine-et-Marne and Burgundy, with a deliberate detour to the village of Murols in Auvergne, which had witnessed whole colonies of landscape artists, from Théodore Rousseau to Victor Charreton. He died in 1966 in Paris, brush in hand.

== Works in public institutions ==
- La rue descendante, 1928. Musée de Montbrison

== Exhibitions ==
(non-exhaustive list)

- French Naturalist Painters 1890-1950 - 12 June - 7 July 2012, The Fleming Collection, London
