= Hussein Bicar =

Egyptian artist

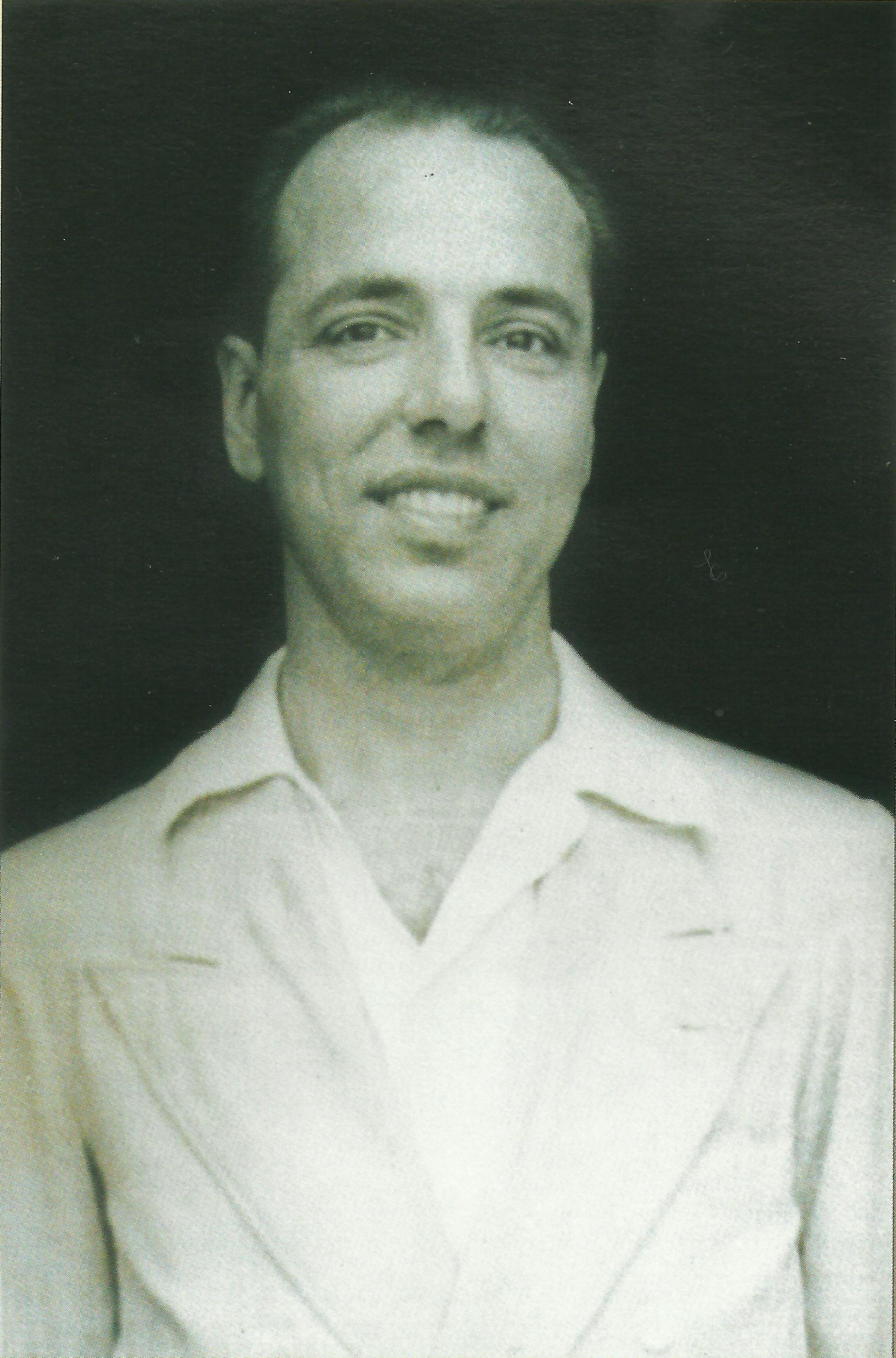
- Bicar as a young man
- Born: Hussein Amin Ibrahim Bicar; January 2, 1913; Alexandria, Egypt
- Died: November 16, 2002 (aged 89)
- Education: Higher School of Fine Arts, Cairo
- Occupation: Artist

Hussein Amin Bicar (Egyptian Arabic: حسين أمين بيكار) (2 January 1913 in Alexandria – 16 November 2002) was one of Egypt's most prominent artists of the 20th century. After graduating from the Cairo's School of Fine Arts in 1934, he spent more than 60 years of his life teaching art at schools and universities and then through the press. Bicar is credited for initiating a style of journalistic art that introduced illustrating for newspapers to a level close to that of the fine art.He is known for his simple and clear style reflecting the influence of Pharaonic art with its harmony, serenity and mysticism. Bicar's journalistic contributions go beyond illustrations to include art criticism and narrative poetry. Being the first Egyptian artist to illustrate Arabic children's books, Bicar has played a major role in establishing and promoting this field.

Furthermore, his portraits and oil paintings depicting Egyptian peasants, Nubian scenes, his native Alexandria and Egyptian Pharaonic themes as well as his nature has earned him recognition and honors. In the words of late journalist Mustafa Amin:"he is not a single artist, he is a master of several arts…he is a painter, photographer, poet, musician and philosopher".

== Early life ==
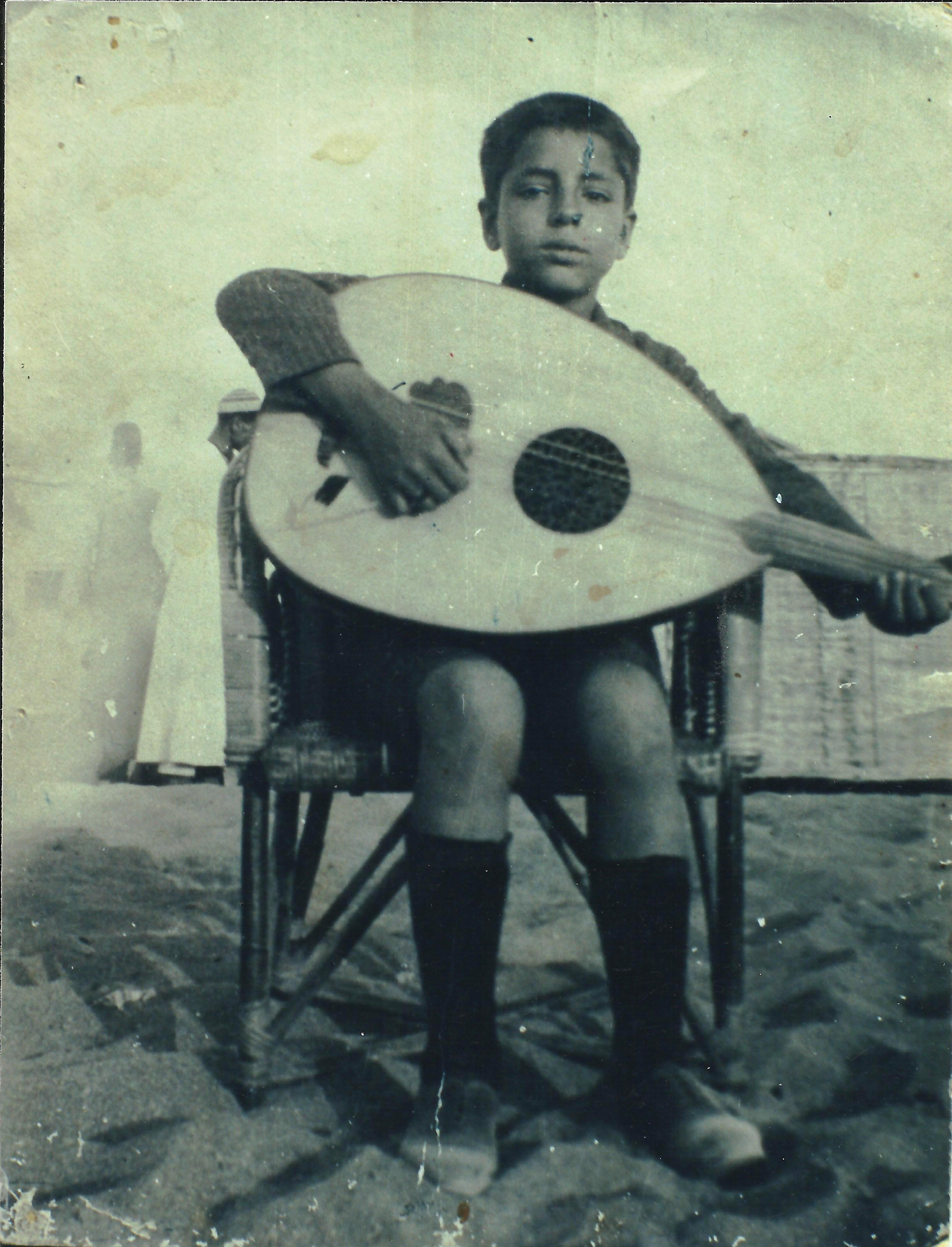
Bicar as a young boy

Hussein Amin Ibrahim Bicar was born on 2 January 1913 near Anfoushi, to an Egyptian family of distant Cypriot descent, he was also a follower of the Baháʼí Faith in Egypt. From the time of his childhood in Alexandria, Bicar seemed destined to be an artist. He could play the lute at the age of eight and by nine, he was in demand as a music teacher for society ladies who due to cultural restrictions could not use adult male teachers.

Bicar's father died when he was young. His mother, who always encouraged his talents, moved him to Cairo when he entered the Higher School of Fine Arts at age fifteen. This school on Khallat Street in Shoubra was founded privately in the early 1900s. All teachers were European and students were obliged to follow a curriculum based in Western art. One of his teachers Friedman Cluezel from Sweden was especially important to Bicar's artistic development. He recognized Bicar to be “gifted as a portrait artist”. To express his confidence, Cluezel asked the young student to draw his portrait—one of the first of many that Bicar produced over the years.

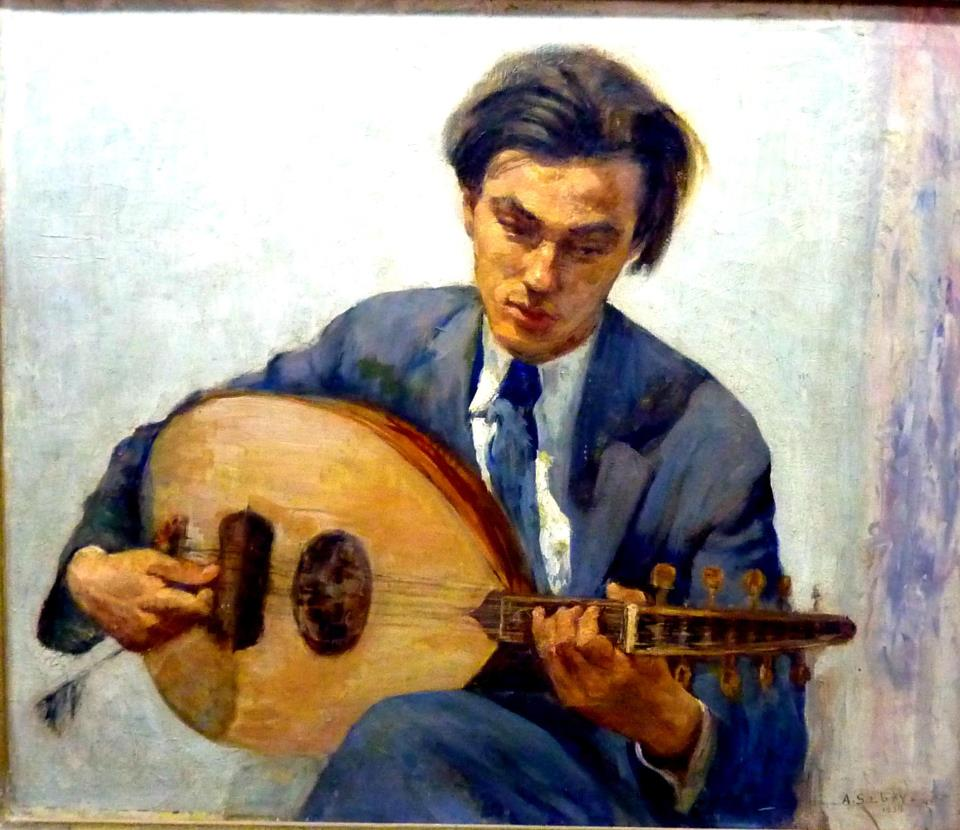
"Bicar playing the lute" by his mentor Ahmed Sabri, 1934

In 1928 the Higher School of Fine Arts was brought under the auspices of the Ministry of Education, and Egyptian artists who had studied in Europe began to be hired as assistants and later as teachers. These teachers brought a new spirit into the school as they promoted sensitivity for Egyptian heritage. Among them was the sculptor Mahmoud Mokhtar. In his senior year, Bicar was able to study with the best portrait artist in Egypt at that time, Ahmed Sabri, who became his mentor and lifelong friend.

After graduating at the top of his class in 1933, Bicar envisioned a successful future as a freelance artist. The economic depression of the 1930s, however, quickly tempered those aspirations. Nevertheless, he succeeded in making a living during these difficult years and, paradoxically, developed the versatility that became one of the defining strengths of his career.

== Teaching career ==
Even from a very early age Bicar taught art to others, in Alexandria when he was just ten years old, he was a music teacher for society ladies who due to cultural restrictions could not use adult male teachers. One of his first jobs was a painter of folkloric scenes in the Helwan wax museum on Ibrahim Street. He also found work as a teacher in elementary and secondary schools and, in 1939, was selected as a member of a team of teachers who went to Morocco to teach at the invitation of the Moroccan government. During the next four years in Morocco, he learned to speak Spanish fluently. He also traveled extensively, taking advantage of his proximity to Europe. Bicar was visiting Berlin when World War II was declared. His job in Morocco ended and the Mediterranean was closed to travelers. To return to Egypt, he was forced to go by way of the Cape around South Africa. He spent three months during this journey painting portraits in Mozambique, then a Portuguese colony and the only neutral country on his route.

In 1943, after his return to Egypt, he was appointed assistant to his former professor, Ahmed Sabri, Bicar spent the next 17 years there where he went on to become the chair of the painting department where he taught the majority of a generation of contemporary Egyptian artists. His inclination to draw on Egyptian heritage for subject was inspirational for many of these students.

== The illustrator and story writer ==
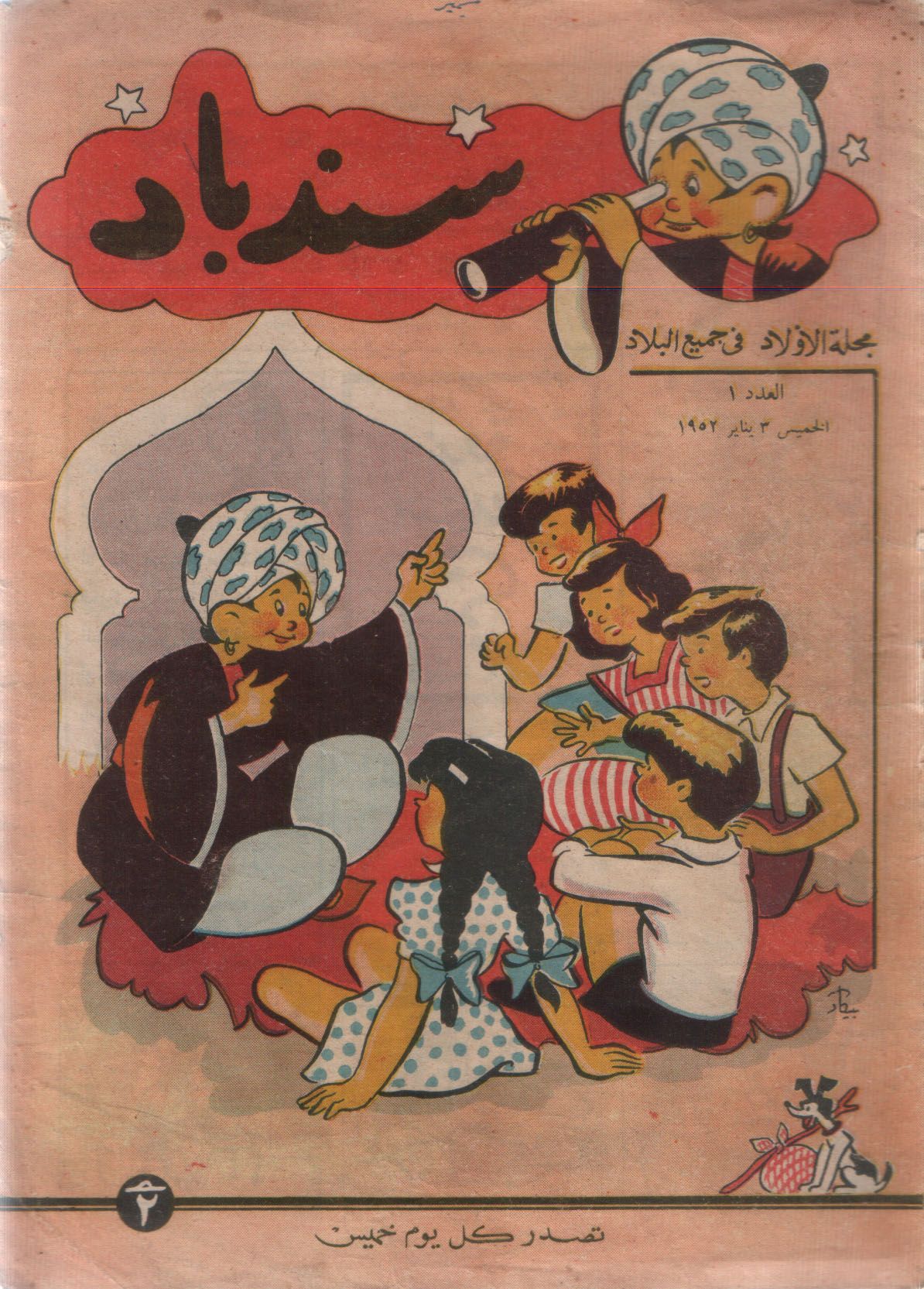
Sindbad Children's Magazine, the cover of the first issue, Jan. 3rd 1952

During the years in which he taught at The Faculty of Fine Arts as an assistant to his former professor Ahmed Sabri, his talent for illustrating began to be recognized, He was asked to prepare drawings for the first illustrated book to be published in Egypt, "The Stream of Days" by the eminent author Taha Hussein. With this book, Bicar discovered a new outlet for his artistic creativity. He began to write himself and to illustrate his writings. His delightful depictions, clear and simple but rich in expression, graced numerous children's books over the years. This labor of love was concentrated ultimately on Sinbad, a children's magazine which Bicar produced and illustrated. Begun in 1952, it was also the first of its kind in Egypt.

As an illustrator, Bicar emphasizes that one should not be limited to a single artistic style. The artist should respond to the subject matter and allow it to suggest an appropriate style. Thus, the artist “gives himself to the subject.” Bicar counts among his friends the famous American illustrator, Norman Rockwell, who “made me proud to be an illustrator.”

== Travels, journalism and poetry ==
Aside from primarily teaching for 17 years, Bicar also did some illustration work for the newspaper, Akhbar El Yom. In 1959, its founders and owners, Ali and Mustafa Amin, asked him to work full-time. He was to fill a unique position, that of a foreign correspondent who produced illustrated reportage for world circulation. He left the Faculty of Arts and began this adventurous assignment which took him to Ethiopia, Syria, Algeria, Morocco, Tunisia and Spain. These travels were curtailed when the newspaper was nationalized in 1962. That position was terminated but Bicar continued to write regular columns as an art critic for Akhbar El Yom and also write and illustrate a series of four–line verses called “The Rubaiyat”.

== Artistry ==
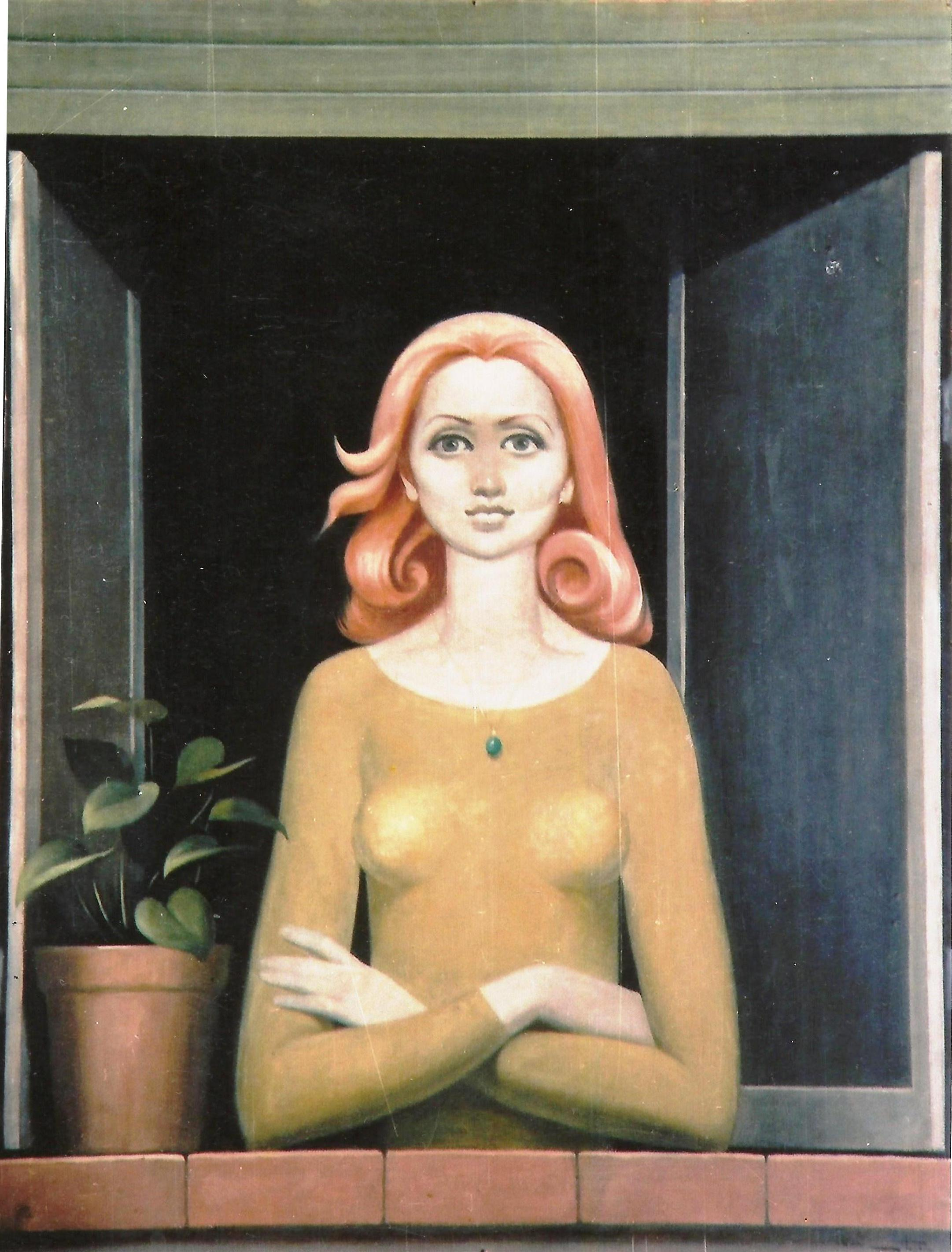
"Triumph" by Bicar, 1973

Bicar believed that the challenge to hitherto artists was to syncretize by being local and international at the same time. He felt that a successful artist acknowledges the interdependence of all societies and cultures yet does not ignore the cultural foundation which gives fundamental meaning to life. Bicar believes that modern art has lost its way by resorting to shape without content. His art has a message. He aspires not “to imitate trite shapes” but to find the spirit that can inspire the artist. He defers to Mahmoud Mokhtar who was the first to insist that modern Egyptian art must come from Egyptian roots but should not imitate traditional art.

As a painter, Bicar's work is characterized by pure and simple lines which convey elements of forcefulness and spirituality. His versatility appears again and again as he works in a variety of media including water color, tempera, and oils—but the result is a distinctive Bicar style.

His subject matter is Egyptian. Unlike classical Greek or Roman art, which may be described as basically physical, the essence of Egyptian art is spiritual. The stylized figures in his paintings carry a poetic message representing the stability, nobility, and strength to be found in the character of Egypt's agrarian roots. His sparse, minimalistic lines often impose a sculptured quality on his figures in their austere settings.

This philosophical orientation towards expressing the spirituality of subjects is also apparent in Bicar's portraits. His subjects seem to glow and exude their personalities. Since his college days, Bicar has continued to be an outstanding portrait artist.

Hussein Bicar's contribution to the arts of Egypt is vast. After more than half a century as an artist and critic, he continued to be eclectic in his tastes, receptive to change, and eager to understand all schools of art as they reflect world conditions. Elegant in his simplicity, Bicar explained, “To understand is to appreciate”.

== Abu Simbel Salvage and "The Eighth Wonder" Film ==
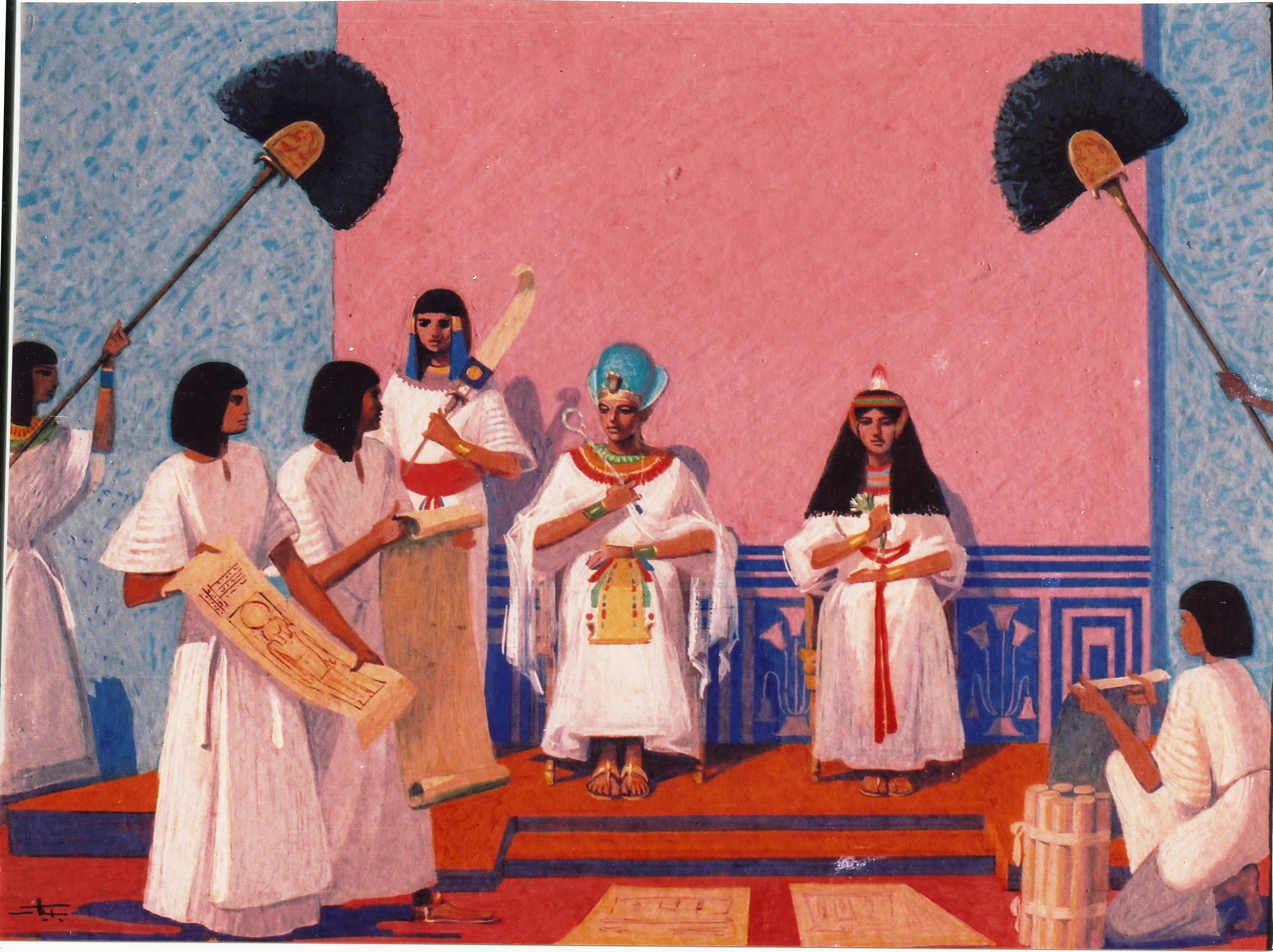
The Eighth Wonder 1

Amongst the numerous works of Bicar is the set of paintings done for "The Eighth Wonder", a documentary narrating the tale of Ramses II Temple in Abu Simbel in southern Egypt. The tale pertains to the construction of The Aswan Dam, begun in 1960 in order to stabilize Egypt's water supply. The resulting flooding during the construction threatened the existence of irreplaceable ancient temples. Such temples are a unique legacy, not only to Egypt but to humanity as a whole. Accordingly, many countries came forward to participate in the rescue of these monuments under the umbrella of the UNESCO. In a remarkable feat of the 20th-century technology, Abu Simbel, one of the most valuable of Egypt's monuments, was moved to a higher location.

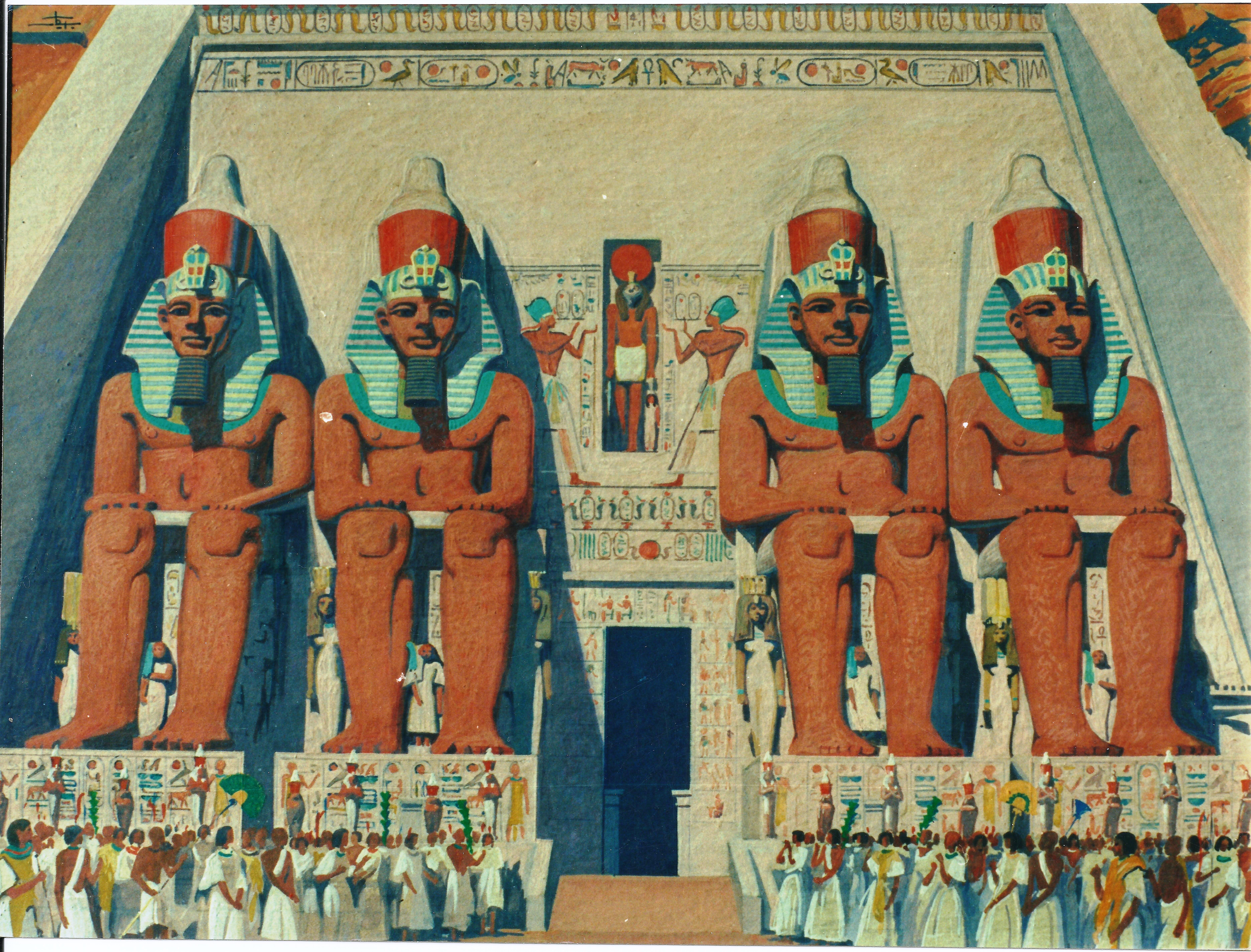
The Eighth Wonder 2

During the transfer of Abu Simbel, the idea developed of making a film to document the history of the temple from its construction to the present, the movie called “The Eighth Wonder” was a product of efforts of former Minister of Culture Dr.Sarwat Okasha. Dr. Okasha asked John Feeney from Canada to direct this production. Dr. Shehata Adam prepared the historical material. The film was produced under the supervision of the Director of the Center for Documentary Film, Hassan Fouad.

Bicar was asked to depict in paintings the early stages of constructing the temple. This included the opening ceremony for Abu Simbel—a ceremony attended by Ramses II and his lovely wife, Nefertari—“the prettiest of the pretty.” Ramses II had built several temples including one for Nefertari constructed next to one of his own.

Bicar created illustrations using historical and geometric information about this architectural structure. It took him more than two years to complete these works, during which he visited Nubia and Thebes, Egypt. These visits helped him gather additional information on this type of architecture.

The commentary of the film was in English and Arabic and was produced in cinema laboratories in Rome for showing in movie theaters in Egypt and in Egyptian cultural centers abroad. It was shown in the Berlin festival for documentary films in 1973. A copy of the film was dedicated by director John Feeney to The New Zealand Film Archive.

Visitors of Kafr El Gouna, near the red sea city town of Hurghada can now visit the Abu Simbel Museum by Bicar. On display are 54 of the paintings he created for the documentary, which showcase his consummate skill in historical illustrations and his passion for the Pharaonic civilization.

== The musician ==
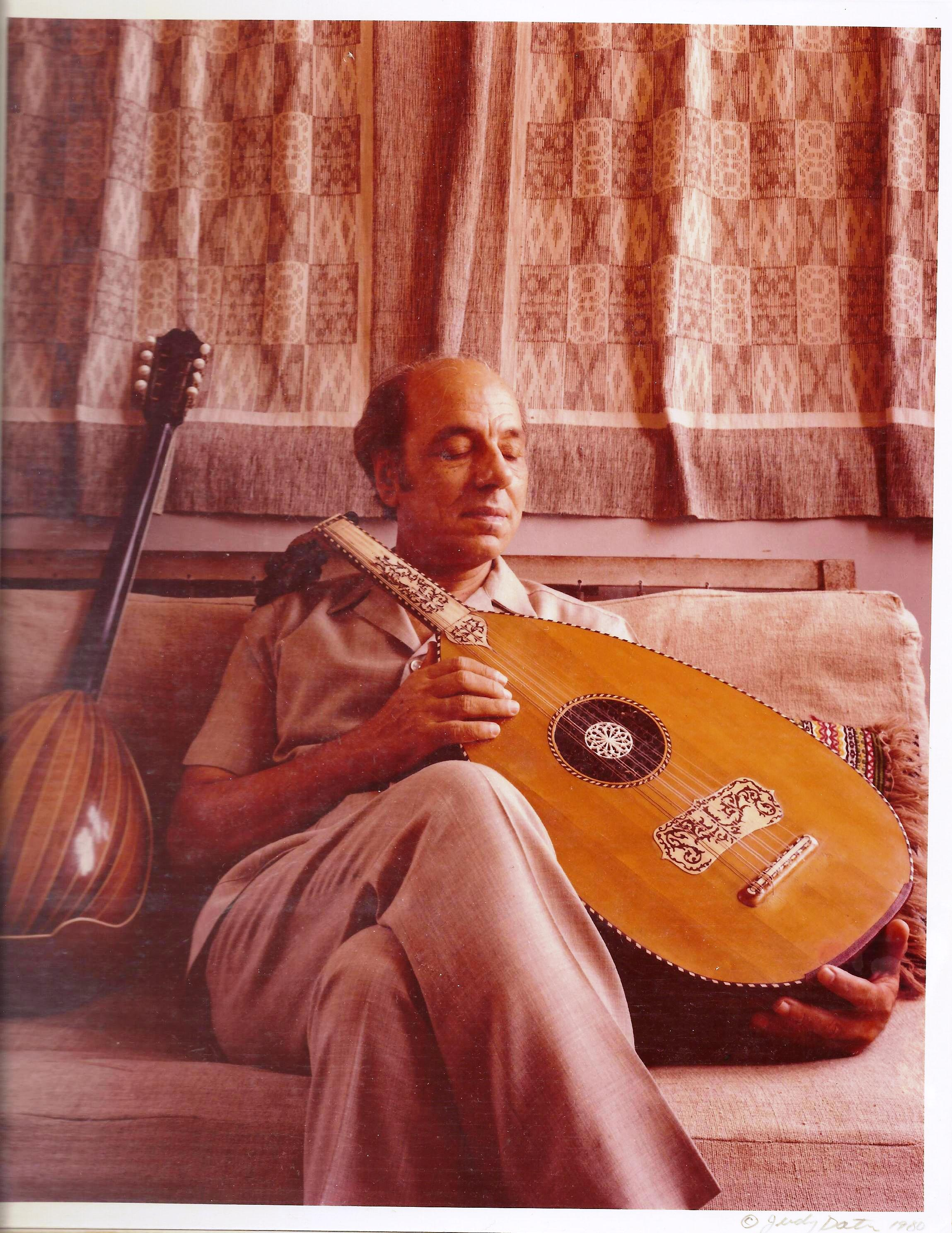
Bicar with his lute and bouzouki

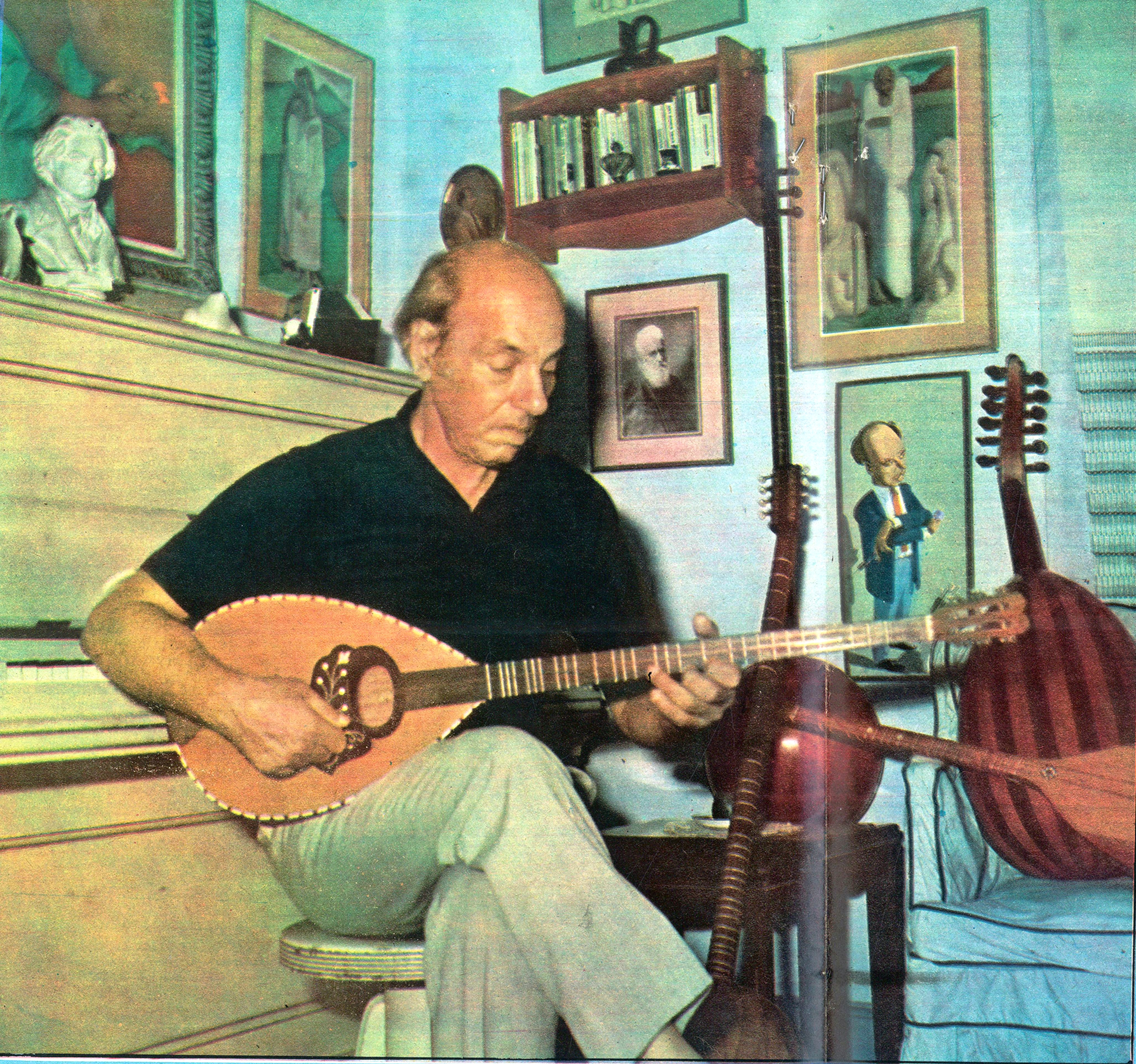
Bicar playing his bouzouki

Bicar was an avid music lover, he could play the lute at the age of eight and by nine was teaching it to young girls and woman society. He never learned how to read notations even with the help of tutor and claimed unfortunately, I did not go beyond the ear, I listen to music but I could never read the note.

Bicar was active in Cairo’s art scene for over 50 years. He worked as a musician, poet, painter, teacher, illustrator, journalist, and writer. His work encompassed cartoons and paintings, and he was associated with an eclectic style. Bicar's approach to art was reflected in his comment that “to understand is to appreciate.”

== Baháʼí life ==
In the 1980s, the Egyptian government arrested a number of Baháʼís, including Bicar, who was one of the high-profile leaders of the community. The Baháʼís were accused of trying to share teachings of the religion, which was banned in Egypt in the 1960s. Labib Moawad, one of Egypt's leading lawyers, defended Bicar and the other Baháʼís, and eventually all charges against Bicar were dropped due to his old age. Bicar presented Moawad with a painting as a tribute for his efforts during the trial. After the trial, Bicar received the Mubarak award for the arts, and his public status was rehabilitated.

== Awards ==
Over the years, Bicar received a number of awards and decorations, among them are the following:

- Medal of pride from government of Morocco, 1942
- Patent of appreciation from Minister of Culture in Syria, 1961
- First class Medal of Science and art, 1967
- Honorary Award of Biennale of Alexandria, 1970
- Certificate of Honor from Art Academy, 1972
- Gamal Abdel Nasser Award with participation of the Soviet Union, 1975
- The State Merit Award in 1978
- National Certificate of Appreciation and Medal of Honor, 1980
- And most recently, the Mubarak prize (Egypt 2000) shortly before his death

== Tribute ==
On 2 January 2017 Google Doodle commemorated Hussein Amin Bicar's 104th birthday.
