= Charles Cottet =

French painter (1863–1925)

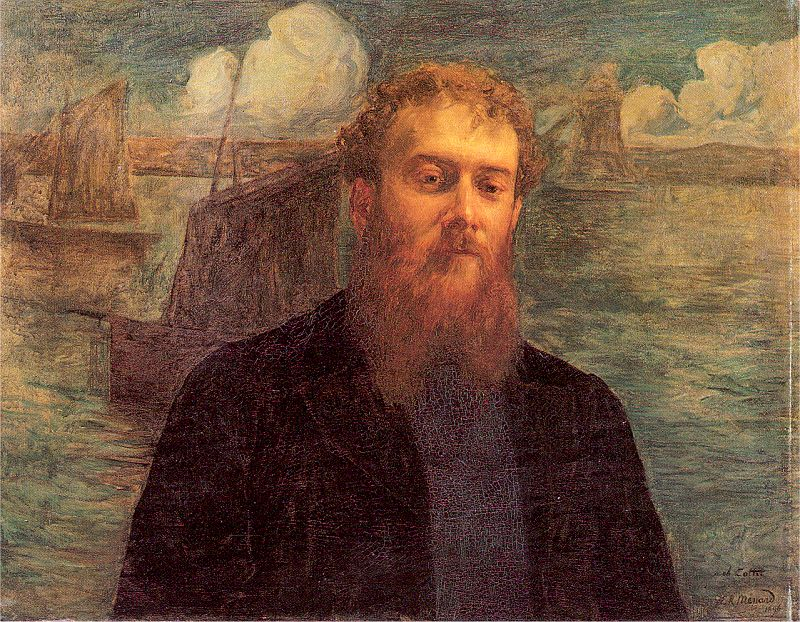
- Émile-René Ménard's Portrait de Cottet (1896)
- Born: Charles Cottet; 12 July 1863; Le Puy-en-Velay
- Died: 20 September 1925 (aged 62); Paris
- Known for: Painting
- Notable work: Au pays de la mer. Douleur, 1908–09; Petit village au pied de la falaise, 1905; Montagne, 1900–10
- Movement: Post-Impressionism

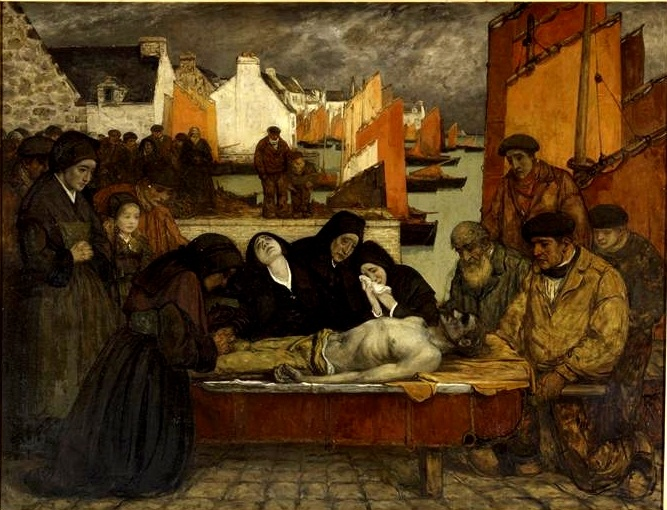
1908–09 Au pays de la mer. Douleur also called Les victimes de la mer, the Musée d'Orsay.

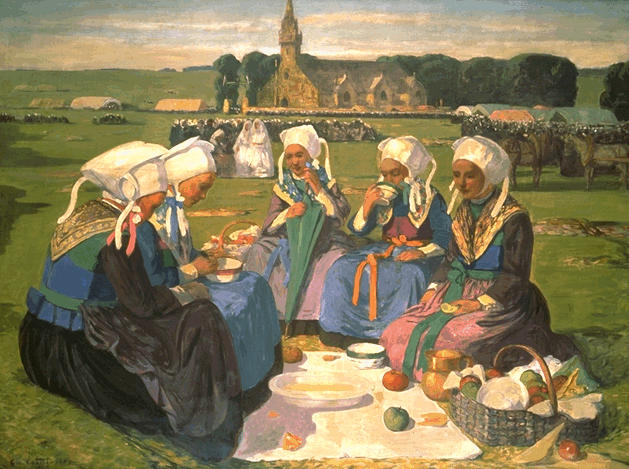
1903 Femmes de Plougastel au Pardon de Sainte-Anne-La-Palud.

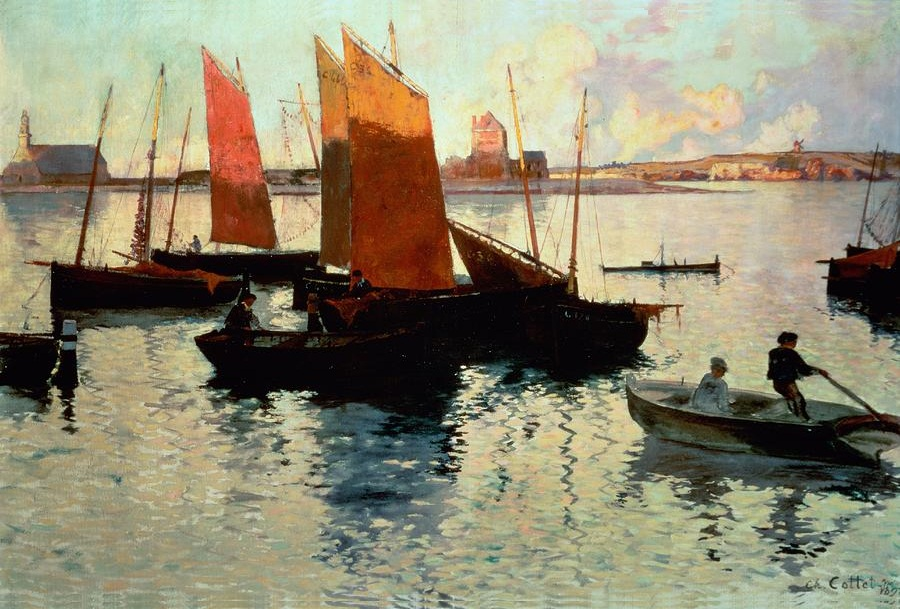
1892 Rayons du soir

Charles Cottet (French pronunciation: [ʃaʁl kɔtɛ]; 12 July 1863 – 20 September 1925) was a French painter, born at Le Puy-en-Velay and died in Paris. A famed Post-Impressionist, Cottet is known for his dark, evocative painting of rural Brittany and seascapes. He led a school of painters known as the Bande noire or "Nubians" group (for the sombre palette they used, in contrast to the brighter Impressionist and Postimpressionist paintings), and was friends with such artists as Auguste Rodin.

== Biography ==
Cottet studied at the École des Beaux-Arts, and under Puvis de Chavannes and Roll, while also attending the Académie Julian (where fellow students formed Les Nabis school of painting, with which he was later associated). He travelled and painted in Egypt, Italy, and on Lake Geneva, but he made his name with his sombre and gloomy, firmly designed, severe and impressive scenes of life on the Brittany coast.

Cottet exhibited at the Salon of 1889, but on a trip to Brittany in 1886 he had found his true calling. For the next twenty years he painted scenes of rural and harbor life, portraying a culture Parisians still found exotic. He is especially noted for his dark seascapes of Breton harbors at dawn, and evocative scenes from the lives of Breton fishermen.

He was close friends with Charles Maurin, and his group included the painter Félix-Émile-Jean Vallotton. Cottet has often been associated with the picturesque seaside symbolism of the Pont-Aven School, though Vallotton famously painted Cottet as a leader of Les Nabis, beside Pierre Bonnard, Édouard Vuillard, and Ker-Xavier Roussel, in his Five Painters (1902–3; Kunstmuseum Winterthur). Cottet was more explicitly the leader of his own small movement, the Bande noire of the 1890s, which included Lucien Simon and André Dauchez, all influenced by the realism and dark colours of Courbet.

== Selected works ==
Cottet's paintings can be found in many museums worldwide, including the Pushkin Museum of Fine Arts in Moscow, the British Museum, the National Gallery of Art in Washington D.C., the Musée d'Orsay in Paris, the Hermitage, the University of Michigan Museum of Art, the Ohara Museum of Art, the Smithsonian American Art Museum, the National Museum of Western Art, the Zimmerli Art Museum, the Fine Arts Museum of San Francisco, the Metropolitan Museum of Art, and the Musée Rodin.

- 1908–09 Au pays de la mer. Douleur also called Les victimes de la mer, the Musée d'Orsay.
- 1905, Petit village au pied de la falaise, Musée Malraux, Le Havre
- 1900–10, Montagne, Musée Malraux, Le Havre
- 1896 View of Venice from the Sea, the Hermitage, St. Petersburg.
- 1896 Seascape with Distant View of Venice, the Hermitage, St. Petersburg.
- 1896 Portrait de Cottet, the Musée d'Orsay.

== See also ==
- List of the works of Charles Cottet depicting scenes of Brittany
