= List of the works of Charles Cottet =

Charles Cottet
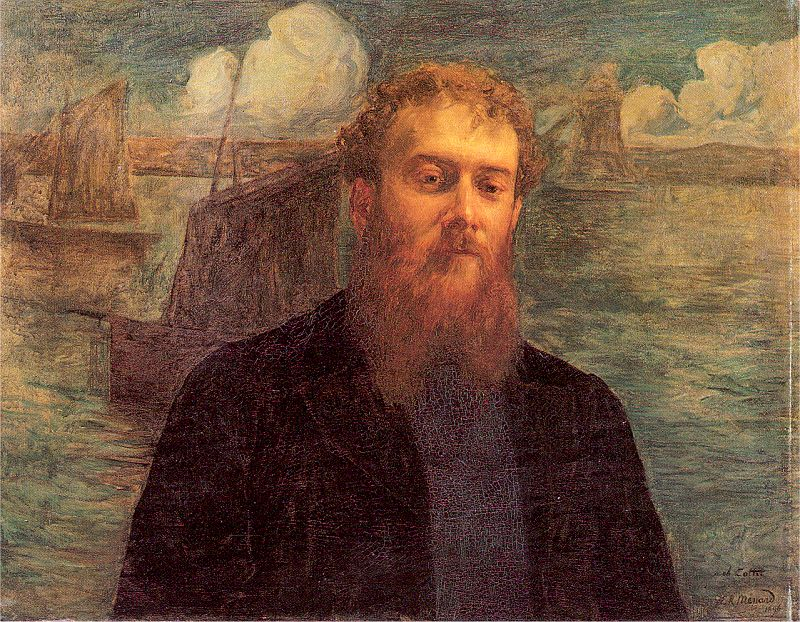
- Émile-René Ménard's Portrait de Cottet (1896)
- Born: Charles Cottet; 21 July 1863; Le Puy-en-Velay
- Died: 25 September 1925 (aged 62); Paris
- Known for: Painting

Charles Cottet (21 July 1863 – 25 September 1925) was a French painter. He was born in Le Puy-en-Velay and died in Paris.

== Biographical detail ==
Although not born in Brittany it was a visit there in 1886 that led to a life-time fascination with the region and Cottet made many further visits over the years, especially to the area around Ouessant.

== Works involving l'Île d'Ouessant ==
This region was particularly attractive to Cottet and paintings linked to the Ouessant included-

Photograph of work	Title and location	Description|Notes
"Deuil"	"Deuil". Museum of Fine Arts, Ghent.	This study of two Ouessant women in mourning, an oil on canvas, was executed in 1903. It depicts one woman trying to console another. Deaths at sea were not uncommon and the scene depicted would not have been a rarity.
Use link given to view this painting.	"Trois générations de Ouessantines".	A work in pastel.
Use link given to view this painting.	"Gens d'Ouessant pleurant un enfant mort". Musée du Petit Palais, Paris	A group of Ouessant people mourn the death of a child.
Use link given to view this painting.	"Portrait de Ouessantine"	A work in oil on board.
Use link given to view this painting.	"Une Ouessantine". Musėe Charlier, Brussels	An aquatint.
Use link given to view this painting.	"Une Ouessantine et son enfant"	
Use link given to view this painting.	"Les Adieux". Musée Pouchkine. Moscow	
Use link given to view this painting.	"Au pays de la mer". Musée Crozatier, Le Puy-en-Velay	
Use link given to view this painting.	"L'Enfant mort".Musée des beaux-arts de Quimper	
	"Mourning, Brittany". Cincinnati Art Museum	Cottet depicts three Breton women in mourning dress.
	"Les feux de la Saint-Jean". Held in the Manoir de Kerazan	Painting shown at the Paris Salon of 1901.
Use link given to view this painting.	"Au pays de la mer : Ceux qui s'en vont, Le repas d'adieu, Celles qui restent". Musée d'Orsay, Paris	This triptych dates to 1898. The central panel shows a group of Bretons at a meal before the men go off to sea to fish (" Le repas d'adieu"). The painting in the right hand panel depicts the men who are going of to fish ("Ceux qui s'en vont") whilst the right hand panel depicts the women left behind ("Celles qui restent")

== Other major works in the Musée d'Orsay ==
Apart from the composition "Au pays de la mer : Ceux qui s'en vont, Le repas d'adieu Celles qui restent" other paintings in the Musée d'Orsay depicting scenes relating to Brittany include:-

Photograph of work	Title and location	Description|Notes
Use link given to view this painting	"Fête Dieu à Camaret". Musée d'Orsay, Paris	A procession in Brittany.
"Rayons du soir, port de Camaret"	"Rayons du soir, port de Camaret". Musée d'Orsay, Paris.	This oil on canvas painting dates to 1892.
Use link given to view this painting.	"Joueurs de cartes". Musée d'Orsay, Paris.	This oil on board painting was executed in 1883. It depicts a group playing cards.
Use link given to view this painting	"Procession de la Vierge de la Mer". Paris; Musée d'Orsay	A triptych depicting a religious procession.

== Works held in the Musėe des beaux-Art Quimper ==
Apart from "L'Enfant mort" mentioned above, the following paintings can be seen in Quimper.

Photograph of work-See "Description|Notes" column	Title and location	Description|Notes
Use link	"Marine bretonne".	A storm brews.
Use link	"Pêcheurs fuyant l'orage".	Some fishermen flee a storm. Painting dates to 1903.
Use link	"Quatre bretonnes".	Four seated Breton Women. Painting executed between 1901 and 1910.

== Other works ==
Photograph of work	Title and location	Description|Notes
See image in Joconde listing	"Le vieux pêcheur à Douarnenez". Bordeaux Musée des beaux-arts	Painting dates to 1895. Depicts a fisherman at Douarnenez.
See link on right	"Les feux de la saint Jean (dedicee a Mr. Courborn)". Achenbach Foundation for Graphic Arts. San Francisco	An etching depicting men and women gathered around an open fire on a dark night.
See link on "artmight.com"	"Selling Livestock".	Breton women selling livestock in a local market.
	"Old Horse in the Wasteland". Ohara Museum. Japan	Study of a horse.
"Low Mass"	"Low Mass" The National Museum of Western Art, Tokyo.	This oil on canvas depicts some Breton women on their way to church.
"Avant l'orage"	"Avant l'orage".	A study of the period before a storm.
Not available	"Un enterrement en Bretagne". Brest Musée des beaux-Arts	This work in oil on wood dates to around 1900 and was acquired by the Brest Art Museum in 1964. It depicts a Breton burial.
Not available	"Retour des sardiniers à Camaret".	This oil and charcoal on board work depicts several sardine fishing boats at Camaret.
	"la procession de la Fête-Dieu à Landudec". Held in the Manoir de Kerazan. Part of the "Fondation Astor". Institut de France	This painting was executed in 1902.
	"Jeune fille de l'île de Sein". Nantes. Musée des beaux-arts	This study of a young Breton woman from the île de Sein dates to 1909. She is seen against a background of the sea dotted with boats. She wears a mourning hat and black shawl.
Use link given to view this painting	"Ferme bretonne : Chaumière bretonne".	The Bibliothèque de l'Institut National d'Histoire de l'Art hold a print of this work in their Jacques Doucet collection.
Use link given to view this painting	"Paysage breton sur la côte". Bibliothèque de l'Institut National d'Histoire de l'Art	Another print held as part of the Jacques Doucet collection.
	"Femme d'Ouessant"	Study of a Breton woman. This print is held by the Bibliothèque de l'Institut National d'Histoire de l'Art as part of the Jacques Doucet collection.
Not available	"French Peasants". Smithsonian American Art Museum	A work in crayon, pencil and chalk on paper.
	"Douarnenez"	Study of the fishing village
	"L'Église brûlée". Musée des beaux-arts in Quimper	This most atmospheric painting depicts the chapelle Notre-Dame-de-Rocamadour in Camaret-sur-Mer. It dates to 1911 and commemorates the fire which ravaged the chapel in 1910. Cottet knew Camaret-sur-Mer well. The painting was shown at the 1893 Salon of the Société nationale des beaux-arts.
	"Au pays de la mer. Douleur ou Les victimes de la mer", Painting held in Paris' Musée d’Orsay.	A fatality at sea is depicted with great detail. This painting was purchased by the French state in 1912. Cottet depicts the harsh lives of the Breton sailors and their families. A drowned sailor has been brought back to the île de Sein port. It was purchased between 1908 and 1909.
See above.	"Femmes de Plougastel au Pardon de Sainte-Anne-La-Palud". Rennes Musėe des beaux-arts.	This 1903 painting depicts a group of Breton women at the Breton pardon held at Plonévez-Porzay each year.
	"Jour de Fête-Dieu à Plougastel"	A procession at Plougastel
Not available	"Petit village au pied de la falaise". Musée d'art moderne André-Malraux. Le Havre	This painting dates to around 1905.
Not available. See link on right.	"Montagne". Musée d'art moderne André-Malraux. Le Havre	Painting executed between 1900 and 1910.

== Gallery ==
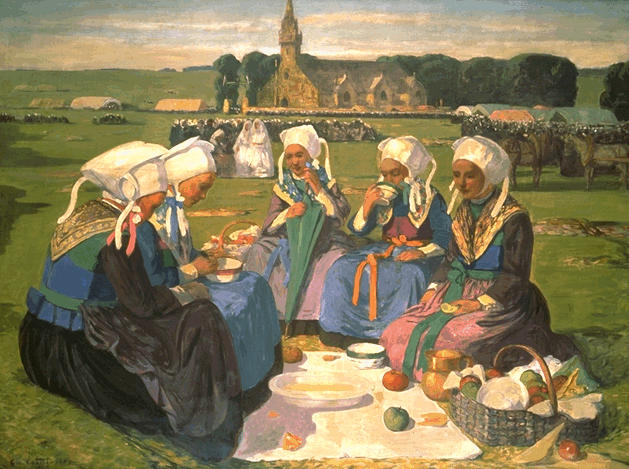
"Femmes de Plougastel au Pardon de Sainte-Anne-La-Palud"

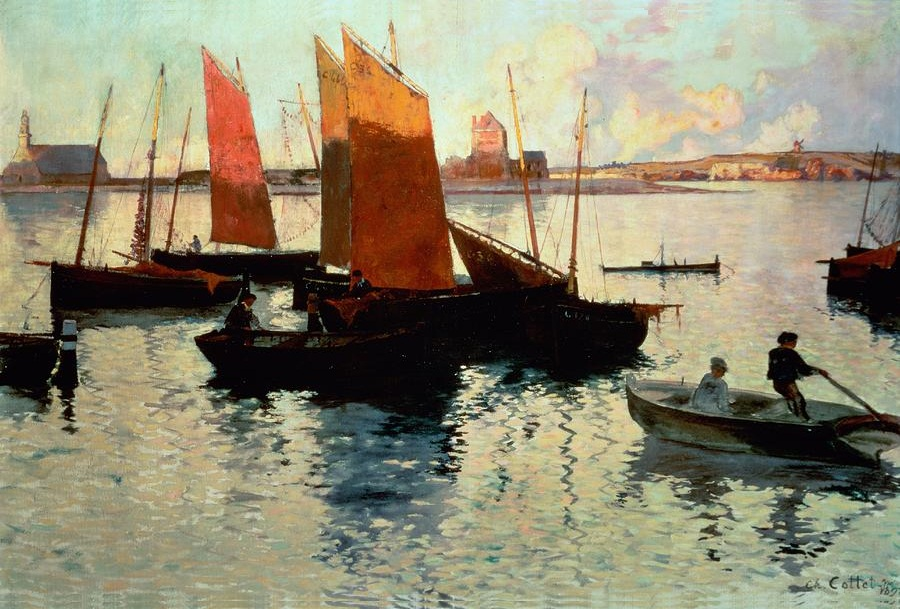
Charles Cottet's "Coucher de soleil sur des voiliers". Painting dates to 1892.

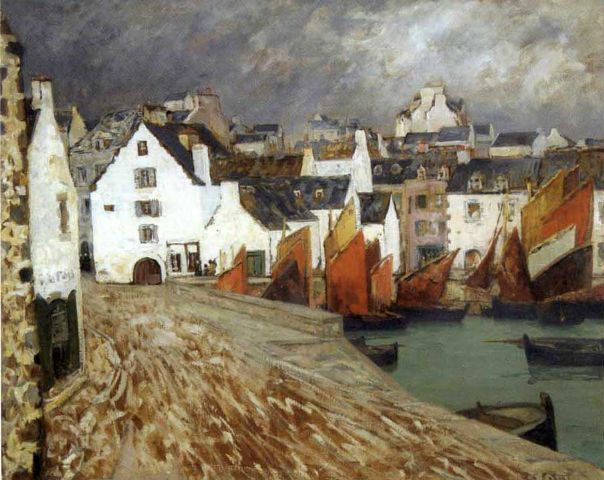
Charles Cottet's "Douarnenez". Painted between 1905 and 1907.

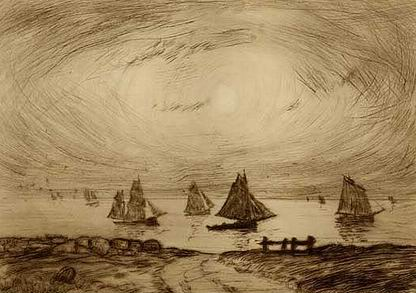
Charles Cottet's Étude pour "Au pays de la mer". A 1908 painting.

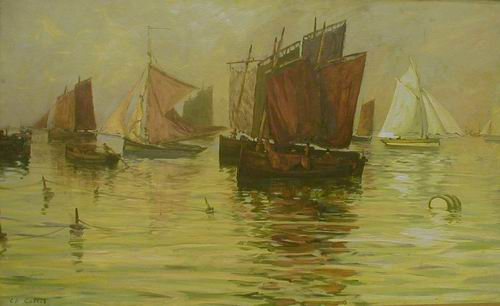
Charles Cottet's "Bateaux". Painted between 1900 and 1910. Held in the Musée d'art occidental et oriental in Odessa.

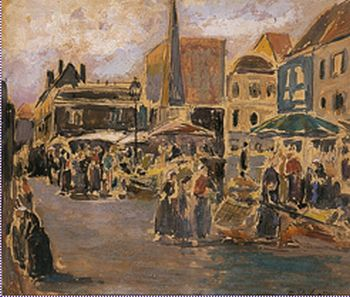
Charles Cottet's "Scène de marché en Bretagne". Painting dating to between 1900 and 1912.

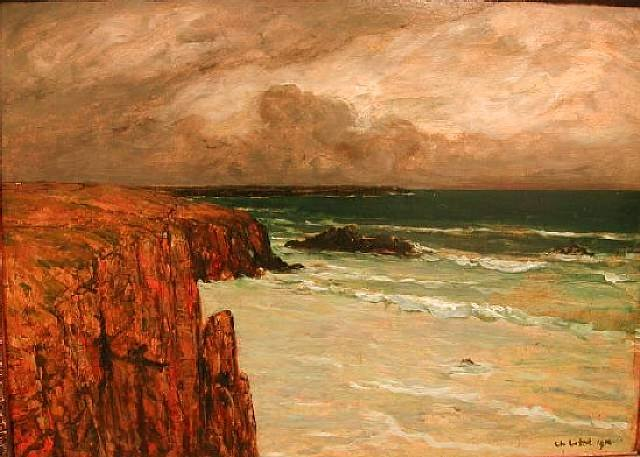
Charles Cottet's "Paysage marin en Bretagne". A 1912 painting.

Charles Cottet's "Retour des pêcheurs dans un port Breton". A 1897 painting.

== Notes ==
1.In the 1890s, Cottet led the movement known as the Bande noire. This group included Lucien Simon, Edmond Aman-Jean, André Dauchez, George Desvallières, and Maurice Denis, all influenced by the realism and dark colours of Courbet.

2.Cottet painted many works unrelated to Brittany such as the 1896 "View of Venice from the Sea" and "Seascape with Distant View of Venice", both in the Hermitage, St. Petersburg. In 1894 he was awarded a bursary which enabled him travel to Italy and Egypt where he completed many paintings.
