= Gaston Balande =

French painter and illustrator

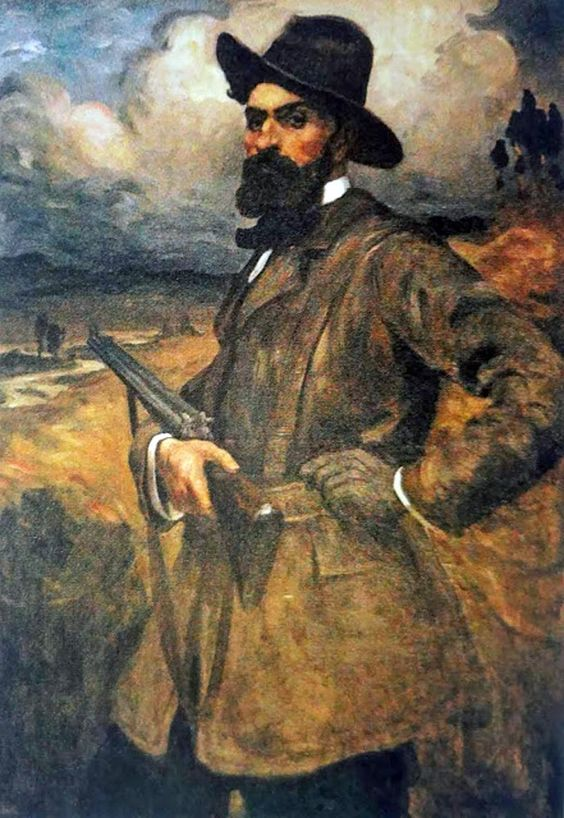
- Gaston Balande, Self-portrait. Private collection.
- Born: 31 May 1880; Madrid, Spain
- Died: 8 April 1971 (aged 90); Paris, France
- Known for: Painting

Gaston Balande (1880–1971) was a French painter and illustrator.

== Biography ==
Gaston Balande was born on 31 May 1880 in Madrid, Spain. He learnt to draw by copying the prints and chromolithographs he saw on the market stalls at Saujon, where he lived. He clearly had innate talent, winning first prize for drawing at his primary school; but having gained his certificat d’études, he was forced to start work rather than continuing with his studies. His mother wanted him to be a pastry chef, a profession she thought would be useful for the family restaurant. The young man refused and got his first job as an apprentice painter at a carriage maker's. His second was as a house painter. After that, he finally found a job that suited him as a picture restorer. This was where his taste for painting was confirmed, and he decided to make it his career. Here he learned the rudiments of easel painting as he accompanied his employer on his trips to paint after nature.

=== Early years ===
Balande's artistic training gained new impetus with the intervention of Alfred Goutureaud, abbot of Royan and an amateur painter, who in 1900 introduced him to his former teacher, Henri-Joseph Harpignies, arranging a meeting in Paris, at the Exposition Universelle. Harpignies wrote a letter of recommendation for his protégé to the director of the École des Beaux-Arts to enable him to improve his drawing. His first lessons were not enough to gain him access to the École Nationale des Arts Décoratifs; so, pending the next session, in March 1901, Balande went back to his hand-to-mouth jobs, working in a sign painting workshop for two francs a day. At the end of these strenuous working days he took evening courses at the design school in Rue Étienne Marcel. He visited Harpignies several times to have his progress assessed. As Balande would recall in his memoirs, ‘I showed him my work from the evening classes, and he encouraged me! And before I left, he poured me a good glass of vintage wine and put a louis d’or in my hand, saying “I don’t like poverty.” This encouragement and generosity bore fruit: a few weeks later, Balande was admitted to the École Nationale des Arts Décoratifs, having come fifth in the entrance examination. At last, he would benefit from a professional artistic training. But even now he was only able to attend the evening course, since he needed to work in the day to support himself.

=== War period ===
In 1902, Balande was passed fit for military service. Forced to give up his courses at the Arts Décoratifs, he was initially posted to assist the medical corps in Bordeaux. Then he was transferred to La Rochelle, where he met the painter Furcy de Lavaux, who was also the curator of the city's fine arts museum, and who invited him to take evening courses in drawing. No sooner had Balande begun working as a nurse in the Aufrédi hospital than he was transferred, this time to the 22nd section at Val-de-Grâce, Paris. A wealthy corporal in the barracks commissioned his first painting, Coucher de soleil sur la Seudre à Ribérou. Balande submitted it to the Salon des Artistes Français, but it was refused. He would later regret this hasty submission; though the jury was soon to recognize his promising talent.

After the war, Balande returned to Paris and went back to his evening courses at the École des Arts Décoratifs and frequented the atelier of Jean-Paul Laurens and Australian artist Rupert Bunny. Influenced originally by Puvis de Chavannes, Bunny was essentially a decorative artist and he communicated to Balande skills in working on architectural scale, which were to stand him in good stead throughout a career punctuated by important public commissions. Thanks to the teaching of Laurens and Bunny, Balande made a successful appearance at the Salon des Artistes Français in 1905 with an ambitious painting titled Quai d’Orsay, en hiver, manifesting a technical mastery which showed how far he had come since the failure of 1902. The painting's merits were recognized by the Académie des Beaux-Arts; the Institut awarded Balande the Edouard Lemaître prize, designated for a landscape artist aged under twenty-five. If Balande's memoirs are to be believed, Cormon may well have had something to do with this award.10 He recalls going to see the Master in the Rue de Rome, where Cormon reproached him for not presenting himself on the evening they first met, as he had suggested. Cormon nevertheless proposed that he join him at his atelier at the École des Beaux-Arts, which Balande only did officially in 1909.

=== Etaples and the European tour ===
In the meantime, at the advice of his friend Rupert Bunny, Balande had moved to Étaples, a fishing port in the Pas-de-Calais, home since the 1880s to a veritable international colony of artists, including the French painters: Henri Le Sidaner, Eugène Chigot, Jules Adler, Francis Tattegrain and Victor-Ferdinand Bourgeois. When Balande joined the group, the ‘School of Étaples’ was at its apogee. The location afforded its artists edifying subjects, primarily the hard-working daily life of fishing communities, which they then presented at the Salon. The artist expressed his emotion in naturalist-style paintings such as Le départ pour la pêche, sent to the Salon in 1907, where it won a second-class medal. This distinction confirmed the awards made by the same jury that same year and 1908.

In 1911, the Conseil Supérieur de l’État awarded him the second travel grant, with the support of the Academy member Georges Lecomte. Balande thus began to prepare for a year of travel paid for by the state. His only obligation was to call in at the local French embassies or consulates in order to withdraw his allowance. Before his departure for Belgium and the Netherlands, Cormon recommended that he study the Flemish Primitives and, above all, repeated his exhortation to stop ‘painting in black’ like Gustave Courbet. The paintings that he composed on his return from Spain, his second destination, show that he had indeed moved in this direction. Even so, the tone and atmosphere remain serious, as in most of the canvases from his Spanish travels. That was not the case with the works he painted in Italy and following his time there. He travelled through the Camargue and along the Riviera and entered the peninsula via Genoa, then on to Pisa, travelling down to Florence and as far as Rome, where he recalled the views painted by Corot and Harpignies. Then he set off for Naples.

=== Balande, war painter ===
Balande's move towards a lighter style of painting began in 1914 when he was working on his luminous Sur les bords de la Seine.

This joyous new élan was cut short by the outbreak of war in 1914. Balande volunteered as an unpaid nurse at the hospital in Saujon. In 1917 the fine arts administration recruited him to go out to the front and paint resonant images of the war. He was sent to Nieuport, in Belgium, and to Verdun, where he composed deeply moving paintings. In this regard, the brutal colours and the line, both sharp and schematic, of his Enterrement à Nieuport are a response to the tragedy of this conflict. But the darkness of the war years did not change the direction he had taken since Italy towards a brighter palette and greater emphasis on light.

In spring 1918 the Balande family took refuge in La Rochelle, moving shortly afterwards to the nearby village of Lauzières. This would long remain the painter's favoured summer retreat. He cycled through the Pays d’Aunis countryside surrounding La Rochelle, much appreciating the unspoilt scenery and character of its people, whom he depicted in everyday scenes. Still showing the soft, smooth touch of his early days, Balande gave his Femmes d’Aunis, a true, touching expression that anticipates the paintings of Brittany by Henri-Alexandre Sollier. Indeed, the two artists were displayed together, along with Paul Deltombe, at the ‘La Victoire’ exhibition organised by Galerie Devambez in 1919. Back in Paris after the war, Balande worked hard to revive his career. In the meantime, the Galerie André and Galerie Marcel Bernheim put on his first major solo exhibitions. Balande also worked to raise his profile in various Parisian salons, showing for the first time at the Salon des Indépendants in 1921, at the Salon de la Société Nationale des Beaux-Arts in 1924, and at the Salon des Tuileries in 1926. It was therefore necessary to paint large quantities of canvases to supply these various events. Partly for this reason, the 1920s and 1930s were by far his most productive years. His stature was confirmed by two invitations to the Venice Biennale as well as numerous solo and group shows abroad – in Brazil, Belgium, Switzerland, Italy and the United States, where he was shown in Pittsburgh alongside Georges Braque, Picasso and Vlaminck.

In 1929 Balande travelled to Morocco, crossing the country from east to west and making many colourful studies on his way. Otherwise, he recharged his creative batteries at his holiday home in Lauzières-sur-Mer, where the surrounding countryside and nearby harbour at La Rochelle became his open-air studio at Easter and in the summer months. It was here, in 1920, that he met Albert Marquet. The painter was spending the summer at the Pays d’Ouest hotel, having been invited down by Paul Signac, then renting a house in La Rochelle. Balande and Marquet became friends and the older Master invited him to accompany him on his painting sessions, working from life. This collaboration deeply affected Balande, and his paintings of the 1920s are strongly influenced by Marquet and his keen sense of values.

=== Between Paris and Lauzières ===
At the start of the 1920s, in his Parisian studio on Boulevard Arago, Balande started working on ambitious decorative compositions which, for him, represented a new approach to monumental painting. In 1921 the first results of this new direction were sent to the Salon des Artistes Français in the form of Un beau jour d’été. The canvas was immediately acquired by the state and included in its permanent exhibition at the Musée du Luxembourg, the forerunner of today's Musée d’Art Moderne de la Ville de Paris. Critics compared the work to Manet, likening the composition of the bathers sitting by the waterside to that of the leisurely figures in Le déjeuner sur l’herbe. Of course, the work's innovative quality was not due to this connection, to which one could easily add a link to Pierre Puvis de Chavannes, but to its novel synthesis between the classical landscape tradition and the modernity of Paul Cézanne.

Balande had begun comprehensively exploring the area of Mantes when he acquired a studio in a farm at Senneville, a village in the Eure, in 1925. As at Lauzières, he patiently created a flower garden which he would then paint on numerous occasions. The flowers he picked were arranged in vases to become the central motif of several still lifes. He painted some of the most personal and accomplished landscapes of his career showing the countryside around the Seine at Senneville. Until the Second World War, his depictions of the Île de France would display the rich, vibrant touch characteristic of his artistic maturity.

=== Towards posterity ===
The official presentation of Camping to the Société Nationale des Beaux-Arts gained him sociétaire status at its Salon. Balande ended the year of 1935 with a pleasant cruise around the Mediterranean during which he discovered Sicily and, above all, Venice, where he created paintings of real sensitivity. He painted the Palais des doges from the landing stage of the ship, which explains the low angle. The year preceding the cruise, in Normandy, he painted the cliff at Etretat. The perspective from the top of the cliffs is vertiginous, and matches the prestigious nature of the painting's final destination: this was in fact a decorative panel commissioned in 1934 by the Compagnie Générale Transatlantique, for whom it would decorate the Salon d’écriture in the first class quarters of the legendary Normandie, the liner whose lavish decoration kept the cream of French artistic talent busy for several years. His painting was such an immediate success upon its installation that he made a second version, which was shown at the Carnegie Institute, Pittsburgh, in 1936. No sooner had Balande completed his painting for the Normandie than he was asked to produce paintings for the dining room of another liner, the De Grasse.

His skill in landscape painting is something that Balande passed on to his foreign students at the American School at the Château de Fontainebleau. From 1926 he taught plein-air classes in the park and surrounding forest; "It is true happiness", he wrote. This bliss lasted until France's declaration of war against Germany in 1939. Balande had spent the preceding months in Greece, painting in the studio provided for him by the director of the art school in Athens, the sculptor Constantinos Dimitriadis. Returning to France, he resumed his duties as curator at the museum in La Rochelle, a position he took up in 1931.

=== The liberation of La Rochelle ===
When La Rochelle was liberated, on 9 May 1945, Balande celebrated the event with the painting Libération de La Rochelle, 61 in which a crowd packs the Place d’Armes now commanded by American tanks. Personal grief shadowed these events: his son André had died from his war wounds in 1941, cutting short a promising career as a painter. Bruised but not vanquished, Balande now set about producing ambitious work that he hoped would position him favourably on the lucrative market of national reconstruction. His Réception du général de Gaulle par la ville de La Rochelle, acquired by the state in 1946, was designed to serve as an artistic calling card and show local decision-makers that he had lost none of his talent for large-scale painting. But he had to wait until 1955 for another public commission, frescoes for a second school in the La Rochelle area.

=== Final years ===
In 1957, Gaston Balande, now aged 77, sold his house at Senneville, leaving only his Parisian studio and the house at Lauzières-sur-Mer, to which he was deeply attached. His last contributions to the Salon des Artistes Français were once more landscapes from Saintonge, showing that his words of 1926 were as true as ever as he entered the twilight of his days: "It is the place I love most of all", he said. "I love Charente-Maritime because it is like no other region. Its luminous sky is matchless. It gives its whitewashed houses a brightness that is almost Oriental." Comparing these landscapes to those of Brittany, near Saint-Malo, whose splendour he readily acknowledged, he confessed to preferring "the simplicity of its Aunisian coast", where he found "all the finesse and distinction" he needed for his art. Such was the profession of faith of this painter of nature who died in Paris on 8 April 1971.

== Works in public institutions ==
- Le départ pour la pêche (Etaples), 1907. Musée d'Art et d'Histoire de La Rochelle, La Rochelle
- Femmes d'Aunis, 1907. Musée d'Art et d'Histoire de La Rochelle, La Rochelle
- Portrait de Paul Gouineau jouant au tennis, 1912. Musée de la ville de Cognac, Cognac
- Le vieux pont d’Espalion, 1920. Musée Départemental, Gap
- Un beau jour d'été, 1921. Centre Pompidou, Musée National d'Art Moderne, Paris
- Improvisation, 1923. Musée des Beaux-Arts, Pau
- Pont de Saint-Aignan, vue de la terrasse du château, vers 1926. Musée d’Orsay, Paris
- Libération de La Rochelle, 1945. Musée d'Art et d'Histoire de La Rochelle, La Rochelle

== Exhibitions ==
(non-exhaustive list)

- Gaston Balande 1880-1971 - 20 February - 8 March 1986, Hammer Galleries, New York
- Les 'Balande' de Saujon - 21 June - 30 August 1996, Archives Départementales de La Rochelle
- La Seine au fil des peintres de Boudin à Vallotton - 23 April - 25 July 2010, Musée de Vernon, Vernon
- Peintures du port - 8 April - 1 May 2011, Chapelle des Dames Blanches and Musée des Beaux-Arts, La Rochelle
- French Naturalist Painters 1890-1950 - 12 June - 7 July 2012, The Fleming Collection, London
