= François Schommer =

French painter

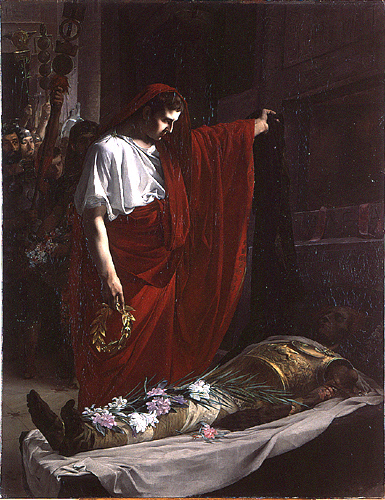
Caesar Augustus at the Tomb of Alexander

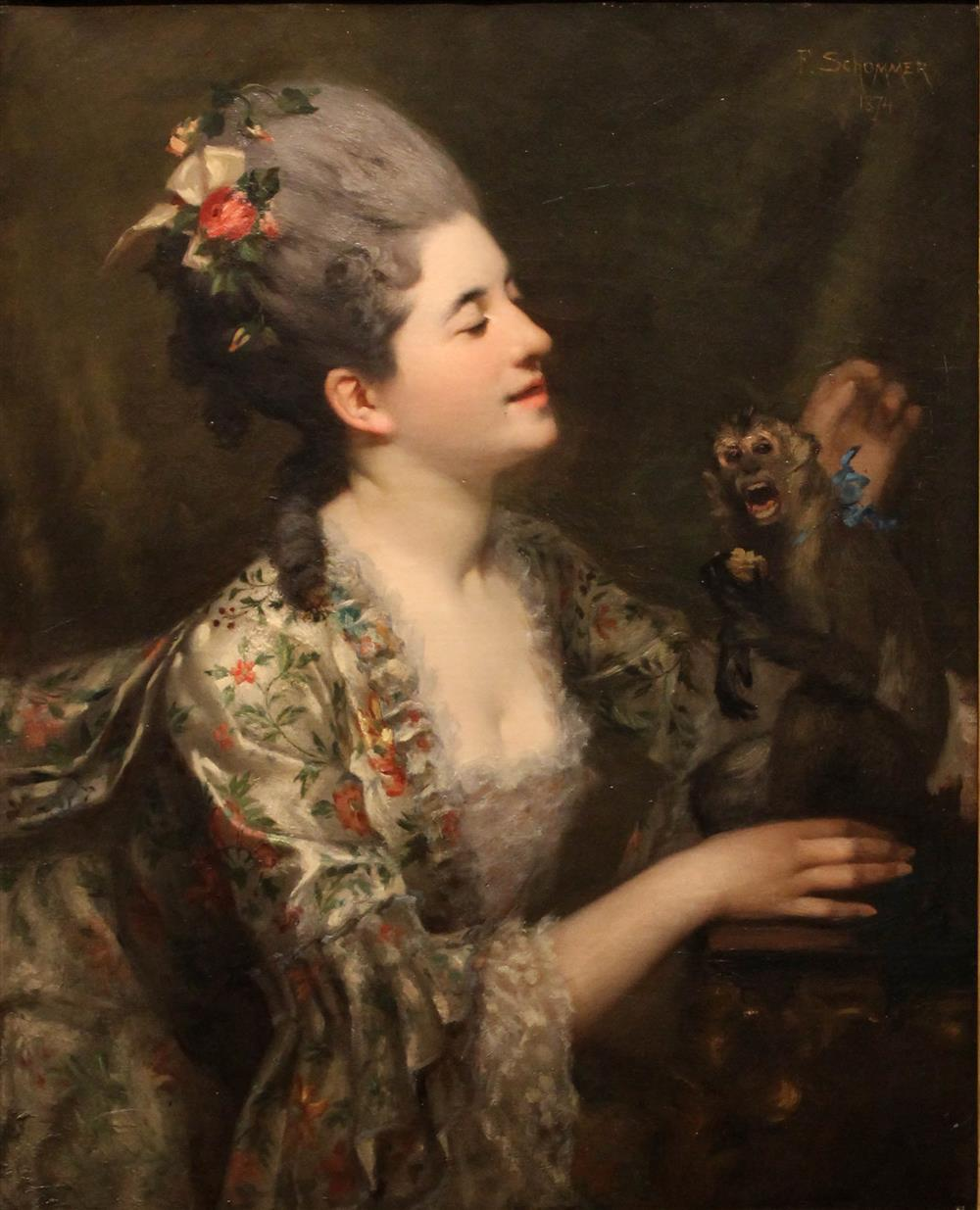
A Woman with Her Pet Monkey

François Schommer (20 November 1850, Paris – 29 October 1935, Neuilly-sur-Seine) was a French painter, watercolorist and decorative artist.

== Biography ==
He studied with Isidore Pils, Henri Lehmann and Jean Éloi Malenfant at the École des Beaux-Arts de Paris. His first exhibit at the Salon came in 1870, and he would continue to exhibit there until his death. He also had showings with the Société des Artistes Français.

In 1878, he was awarded first place in the Prix de Rome for his work "César-Auguste au tombeau d'Alexandre". Later, he received silver medals at the Exposition Universelle (1889) and the Exposition Universelle (1900).

In 1910, he was named a professor at the École des Beaux-Arts and also served on the faculty at the Académie Julian. Marie Laforge, Ahmed Sabri, Henri-Alexandre Sollier and Sébastien Laurent were among his better known students. He became a member of the Institut de France in 1924.

In addition to his canvases, he executed decorative paintings on the ceilings of the Sorbonne, the Hôtel de ville de Tours, the Hôtel de ville de Roubaix and the École des Beaux-Arts, as well as panels for the foyer at the théâtre de l'Odéon.

He was named a Knight in the Legion of Honor in 1890, and was later promoted to Officer. He is interred at the Cimetière du Père-Lachaise.

His works may be seen at the Musée de l'Armée and the Musée d'Orsay.
