= Ahmed Sabri =

Modern Egyptian painter

- احمد صبري
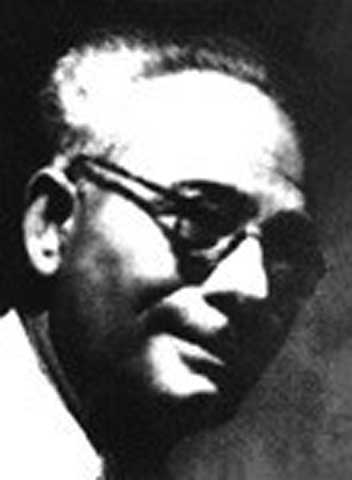
- Born: 20 April 1889; Cairo, Egypt
- Died: 8 March 1955 (aged 65)
- Education: Académie Julian; Paul Albert Laurens
- Known for: painting
- Movement: Impressionism

Ahmed Sabri (أحمد صبري), also spelled Ahmad Sabry (b. 20 April 1889 – 8 March 1955) was an Egyptian painter born in Cairo. He was one of the most prominent pioneers of modern portraiture art in Egypt.

== Biography ==
Sabri was born in the Megharbeleen neighborhood of Cairo's Al-Darb al-Ahmar district. He suffered from a tormented upbringing, moving houses frequently after being orphaned at an early age. In 1910, he joined the Cairo prince Youssef Kamal Fine Arts School and graduated in 1914. He traveled to Paris in 1919 where he joined the Académie de la Grande Chaumière, and then the Académie Julian studying in the atelier of François Schommer and under Prof. Paul Albert Laurens, as well as with the painter Emmanuel Fougerat.

When he returned to Egypt, he worked as an illustrator with the Entomology Department of the Ministry of Agriculture, then as an artist with the Ministry of Public Works, which sent him on a further scholarship to Paris; there, he exhibited his painting "The Nun" in the Grand Palais in 1929, and was awarded the Prix d'Honneur by the French Arts Society. In 1929, Egyptian artists who had studied in Europe began to be hired as professors in the Higher School of Fine Arts, Ahmed Sabri took up work as a professor in this institution and soon headed the painting department until he retired in 1951. There he fostered the talents of numerous Egyptian masters such as Hussein Bicar, Salah Taher, and Hamed Owais.

He became blind a few years before his death in 1955.

== Major works ==
- "After Reading" displayed in the Paris International Exhibition of 1925 received a gold medal at the Paris International Salon in 1929.
- "The Nun" received the Honor award from the French Society of Arts in 1929.
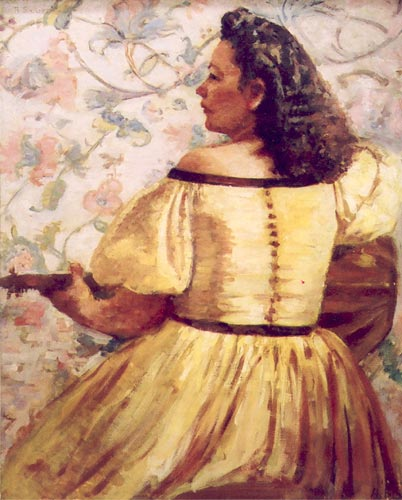
A woman plays on 'Oud

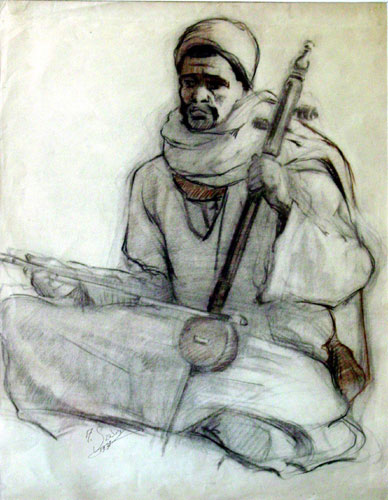
A man plays on Rababa

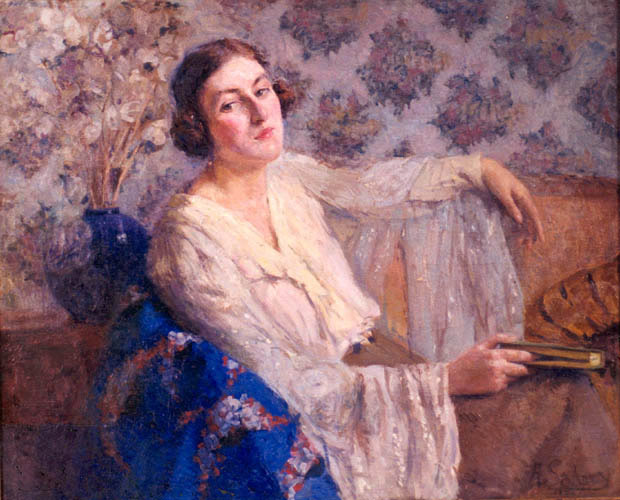
After Reading

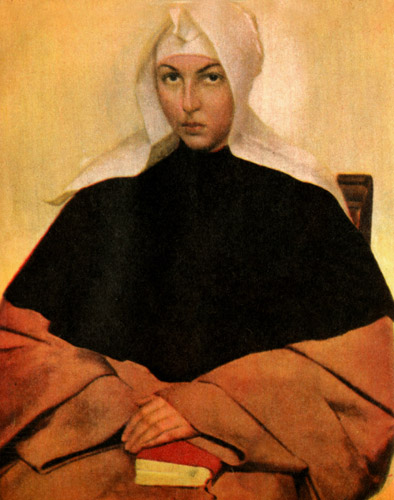
Meditations or
"The Nun"

== Collection ==
- The Museum of Modern Egyptian Art in Cairo acquired about 40 paintings of his artworks that are always characterised by luxury, aristocratic subjects, clarity and pure Egyptian light, today a wing in the museum, the Ahmed Sabri Hall is named after him.

== Major shows ==
Sabri started his first art exhibition in Cairo in 1925.

- Participated in the Paris Salon d'Automne in 1929.
- Exhibition of his work with the re-opening of the Museum of Modern Egyptian Art in October 1991.
- Exhibition in Hall of Candles 1997.
- Exhibition in Hall of Horizon at the Mohamed Mahmoud Khalil Museum in 2003.
- Cairo Atelier Salon for the first Portrait Cairo Atelier September 2005.
- Gauguin exhibition hall in Heliopolis on the occasion of the golden anniversary of his death memory in 2006.
- Salon Gallery in Hall of Gauguin first session in May 2007.
- Photo pigtail communication between the pioneers and the new generations of talent "Grandfather And Grandson" in Hall of Dimensions at the Museum of Egyptian Modern Art in January 2008.
- Exhibition of League in Cordoba Arts Engineers Gallery July 2009 – (guest of honor).
- Exhibition of Creativity Keys in the main hall of Prince Amr Ibrahim Palace, (Museum of Islamic Ceramics) in January 2010.
- Exhibition in Hall of Picasso in Zamalek, February 2010.
- Exhibition of Museum of Fine Arts Holdings in Alexandria in Hussein Subhy's Hall (Albab-Saleem) at the Museum of Modern Egyptian Art in May 2010.
- The twenty second National Association of Fine Arts Salon in Sultan Al-Ghuri Complex May 2011 – (guest of honor).
- Cairo, Salon (fifty six) of the Fine Arts Palace, March Arts in 2013.

== Bibliography ==
- Hussein Bicar, Aḥmad Ṣabrī, al-Hayʼah al-ʻĀmmah lil-Istiʻlāmāt, 1983.
- A chapter about his art and his life was published in the encyclopaedia: A Museum in a Book, by Sobhy – El Sharouni, in 1998.
- Muhammad Sidqī al-Jabākhanjī; Sīrat hayat al-fannān Ahmad Sabrī, Cairo, al-Dar al-Misriyah, 1967.
- Jessica Winegar, Creative Reckonings: The Politics of Art and Culture in Contemporary Egypt. ISBN 0804754772
