= Victor-Ferdinand Bourgeois =

French painter and illustrator (1870–1957)

- Born: 1 August 1870; Amiens, France
- Died: 6 October 1957 (aged 87); Dieulefit, France
- Known for: Painting

Victor-Ferdinand Bourgeois (August 1, 1870 in Amiens – October 6, 1957 in Dieulefit) was a French painter and illustrator.

== Life and career ==
=== From Amiens to Paris ===
Victor-Ferdinand Bourgeois, born in Amiens on 1 August 1870,1 studied at the École Régionale des Beaux-Arts de la Somme and at the Arts Décoratifs in Paris, where he won major prizes. Assessed as hors-concours in 1892, he was appointed to the art directorship of the Manufacture nationale de Sèvres and joined the studio of Luc-Olivier Merson, who had just been elected to the Académie des Beaux-Arts. In the 1894 École des Beaux-Arts competition Bourgeois came first of four hundred students and in 1897 won the Prix Chenavard, enabling him to participate in the Salon des Artistes Français the following year. Here he exhibited La ville d’Amiens recevant les hommages de ses industries. The canvas was immediately acquired by the French government for Amiens Town Hall; this was his first and last public commission, a vast allegorical composition conforming to the iconography and style widely employed in public monuments of the Third Republic. Exhibited at the 1900 Exposition Internationale, it was awarded a bronze medal.

=== Naturalist painter and peintre de Salon ===
In 1901, Salon Bourgeois exhibited Dur labeur. This imposing canvas of peat diggers is in the naturalist style popularised since the 1870s by Léon Augustin Lhermitte and Jules Bastien-Lepage. He continued in this vein with his Portrait du père de l’artiste en ouvrier, and his most ambitious realist work, the triptych Chez les Chouans, representing the universal themes of youth, family and old age. This portrayal of the peasant world, a representation of the working environment of the farmyard, is a clear departure from the tradition of historical painting.

=== Stay in Etaples ===
An admirer of Jules Breton, Bourgeois was also interested in the world of the sea. He visited Étaples several times, where the port’s hustle and bustle offered him lively subjects, illustrated by canvases such as L’Arrivée du poisson and Retour des pêcheuses de crevettes, exhibited respectively at the 1907 and 1908 Salons. Four years later Gaston Balande was to paint an analogous subject, confirming the attraction of Étaples for naturalist painters.

=== Trip to Switzerland ===
His research into light found new expression in the technique of pastel. He first experimented with this new medium during a trip to Switzerland in the autumn of 1908 where, working outdoors, he produced a radiant series of pastels exhibited in February of the following year at the Galerie Georges Petit in Paris.19 The French government immediately acquired Lac Léman (Lake Geneva), a majestic and iconic scene depicted in a number of different versions, all concentrating on the shimmering expanse of water. From the village of Chexbres, with its fine views of the lake, Bourgeois drew the snow-capped peaks of the Alps and the tops of russet trees standing out sharply against the clear azure of the sky. His supreme mastery of pastel technique is further demonstrated by another fine work, his Sallance waterfall, drawn upstream from the lake itself.

=== With Armand Guillaumin in the Estérel ===
Armand Guillaumin invited Bourgeois to join him in southern France in the spring of 1911. Together they explored the French Riviera. Between the Bay of Agay and Le Trayas the bright red rocks, illuminated by the intense blue of the sea and the incomparable southern light, offered the two artists an exceptional panoramic subject and a chromatic impact that was utterly overwhelming for Bourgeois, as it had been for Guillaumin during his first visit in 1885. The red rocks’ fiery display set alight the palette of this artist from Picardie in northern France. Bourgeois turned out many luminous rough drawings and sketches directly from nature there, later transformed into incandescent paintings and pastels.24 With their Fauvist touches, these works constituted a point of no return. Bourgeois had finally discovered the way forward. From that moment on he painted nature with the same eyes as Guillaumin, and, thanks to his colleague, tapped into the sensibility of Monet, Sisley, Gauguin and Othon Friesz, who all loved and celebrated light.

=== Dieulefit ===
After the loss of his second wife, Bourgeois married Jeanne Marthe Bertrand on 19 March 1928 and they moved together to Dieulefit where she was born. Subsequently, he rarely left his Provençal retreat. One such retrospective was the 1926 Cinquantenaire de la Fondation des Prix du Salon et Bourses de Voyages (the 50th anniversary show commemorating this important institution) as well as the retrospective at the 1929 Salon d'Automne and another at the 1945 Salon d’Hiver, while in 1938 Le départ du bateau grec was selected by the Société Lyonnaise des Beaux-Arts to add lustre to its Salon. But apart from these rare appearances, none of his faithful friends, such as Paul Chabas, Georges Rouault and of course Guillaumin, managed to draw him away from the solitude of his studio in the Dauphiné. Yet Bourgeois continued to paint, pursuing to his dying day an obsessive quest for light and transparency, as his landscapes of Drôme and the Dauphiné clearly show.

Victor-Ferdinand Bourgeois died on 6 October 1957 in Dieulefit. Known for his reclusive nature, he received critical acclaim during his lifetime and developed a devoted following among collectors.

== Works in public institutions ==
- La ville d’Amiens recevant les hommages de ses industriels, 1897. Town Hall, Amiens
- Chez les Chouans, 1902. Musée de Picardie, Amiens
- Lac Léman, 1908. Musée de Picardie, Amiens

== Exhibitions ==
(non-exhaustive list)

- Exposition de pastels par Victor Bourgeois - 16–28 February 1909, Galerie Georges Petit, Paris
- Victor F. Bourgeois, Peintures & Pastels - 30 November – 31 December 1945, Salon d’Hiver, Palais de Tokyo, Paris
- French Naturalist Painters 1890–1950 - 12 June – 7 July 2012, The Fleming Collection, London
