= Bande noire (art) =

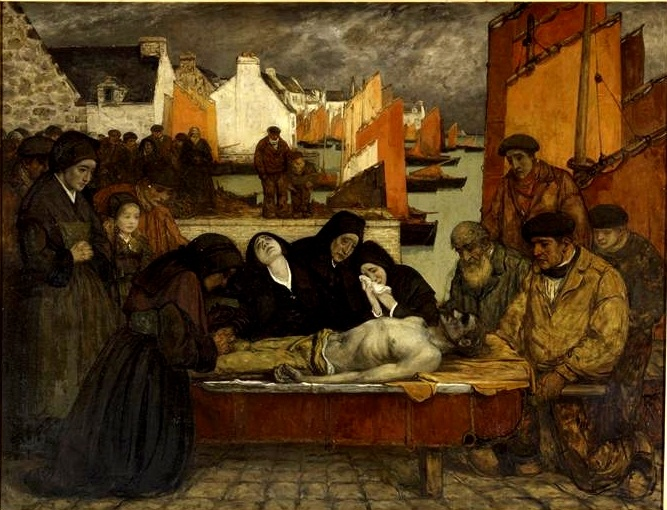

The Bande noire (Black Band) was a group of French painters of the 1890s who used a darker and richer palette than most of their Impressionist contemporaries, aiming for a stylistic fusion of Impressionism with the raw or melancholy realism associated with painters such as Gustave Courbet. They were also sometimes known as the Nubians to differentiate them from the group known as Les Nabis.

The Bande noire got their name after the painter Charles Cottet exhibited a painting called The Burial at the Paris Salon of 1894. Besides Cottet, the artists most associated with this rather loosely defined group included Lucien Simon, Émile-René Ménard, René-Xavier Prinet, and André Dauchez. Other artists with affinities to the Bande noire include Walter Gay, Gaston La Touche, and Constantin Meunier.
