= Pharaonic =

2016 video game

- Developer: Milkstone Studios
- Publisher: Milkstone Studios
- Engine: Unity
- Platforms: Windows, Linux, macOS, PlayStation 4, Xbox One, Nintendo Switch
- Release: April 28, 2016
- Genres: Action RPG, side-scroller
- Mode: Single-player

Pharaonic is an action role-playing game developed and published by Milkstone Studios. It was first released on April 28, 2016, for Microsoft Windows, and later for PlayStation 4, Xbox One, Linux, macOS, and Nintendo Switch.

== Plot ==
The game is set in a fictional and mythological version of Ancient Egypt, where a nameless prisoner escapes captivity and embarks on a quest to uncover the truth behind the Red Pharaoh, a demigod tyrant who has plunged the land into darkness.

== Gameplay ==
Inspired by Prince of Persia and Dark Souls series, Pharaonic features a real-time combat in a side-scrolling format, with 2.5D stylized graphics. The combat relies on a stamina bar and features light and heavy attacks, blocking, and dodging mechanics. A wide variety of combat styles are available, alongside a character progression system.

The level design is non-linear, featuring interconnected areas, unlockable shortcuts, and hidden secrets to encourage exploration. The story is primarily conveyed through texts, items, and interactions with non-playable characters.

There are various chests that can be opened throughout the game, offering items that improve the character's stats, such as damage or defense. All the collected equipment is reserved for specific body parts and are equipped through the character's menu. The players can access a market where they can sell and buy items.

== Development ==
The game was developed by Milkstone Studios, also known for Ziggurat. The team aimed to create a "Dark Souls in Egypt", translating the Soulslike formula into a mythological setting with 2D gameplay. The development was self-funded. It was built using the Unity engine, which enabled a multi-platform release. Unlike other soulslike games that typically use a medieval dark fantasy tone, Pharaonic adopted a vibrant visual style based on Ancient Egyptian art and iconography.

== Reception ==
Pharaonic received "mixed or average" reviews for the Xbox One version, according to review aggregator website Metacritic. It was praised for its art direction, original setting, and faithful adaptation of Soulslike combat, although some reviewers noted a steep difficulty curve and enemy repetition.
