= Jules Adler =

French painter (1865–1952)

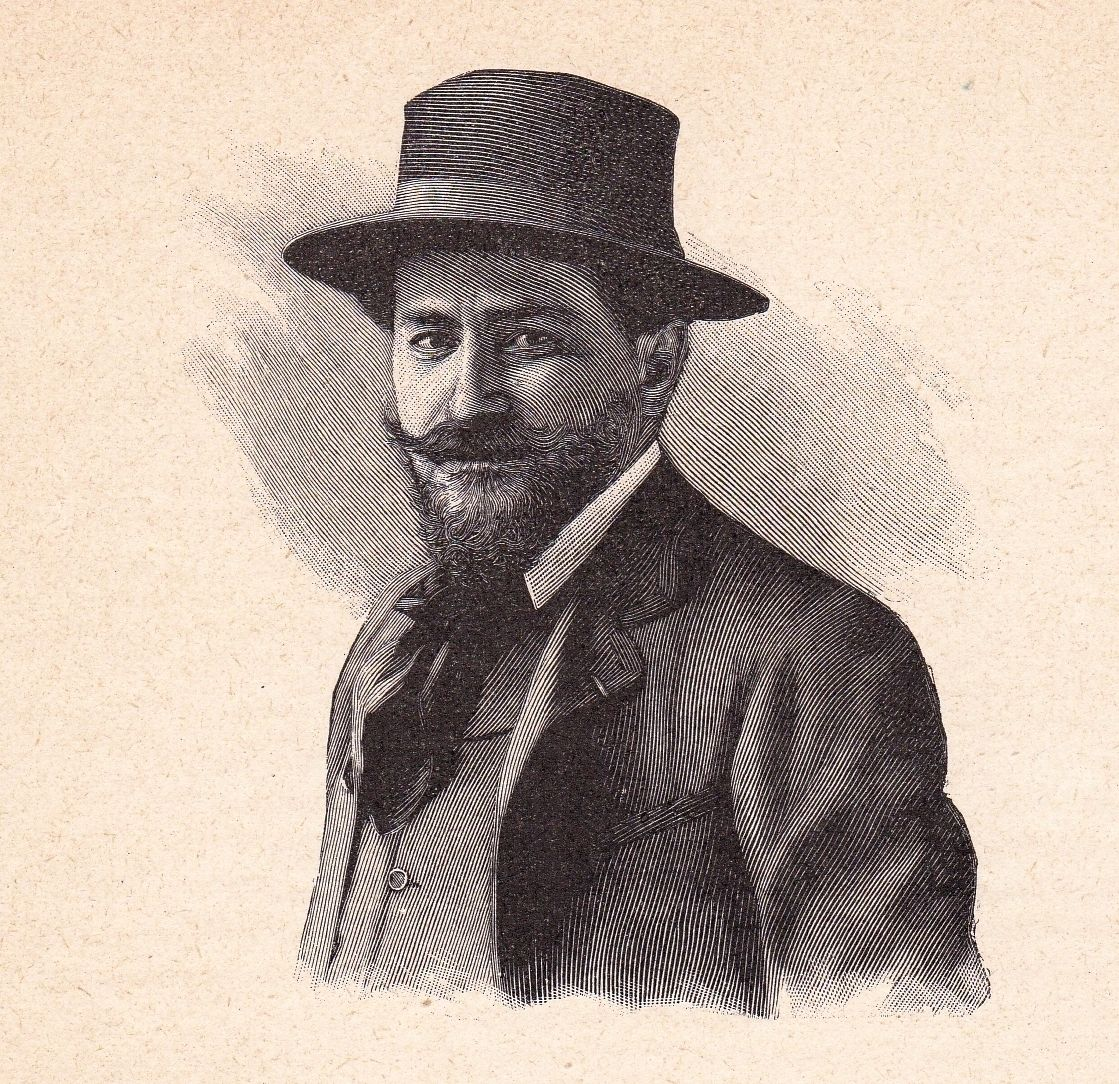
Jules Adler

Jules Adler (Luxeuil-les-Bains, 8 July 1865 – Nogent-sur-Marne, 11 June 1952) was a French painter, named «le peintre des humbles» by Louis Vauxcelles, a painter of labour, strikes and working people.
