= Émile-René Ménard =

French painter (1862–1930)

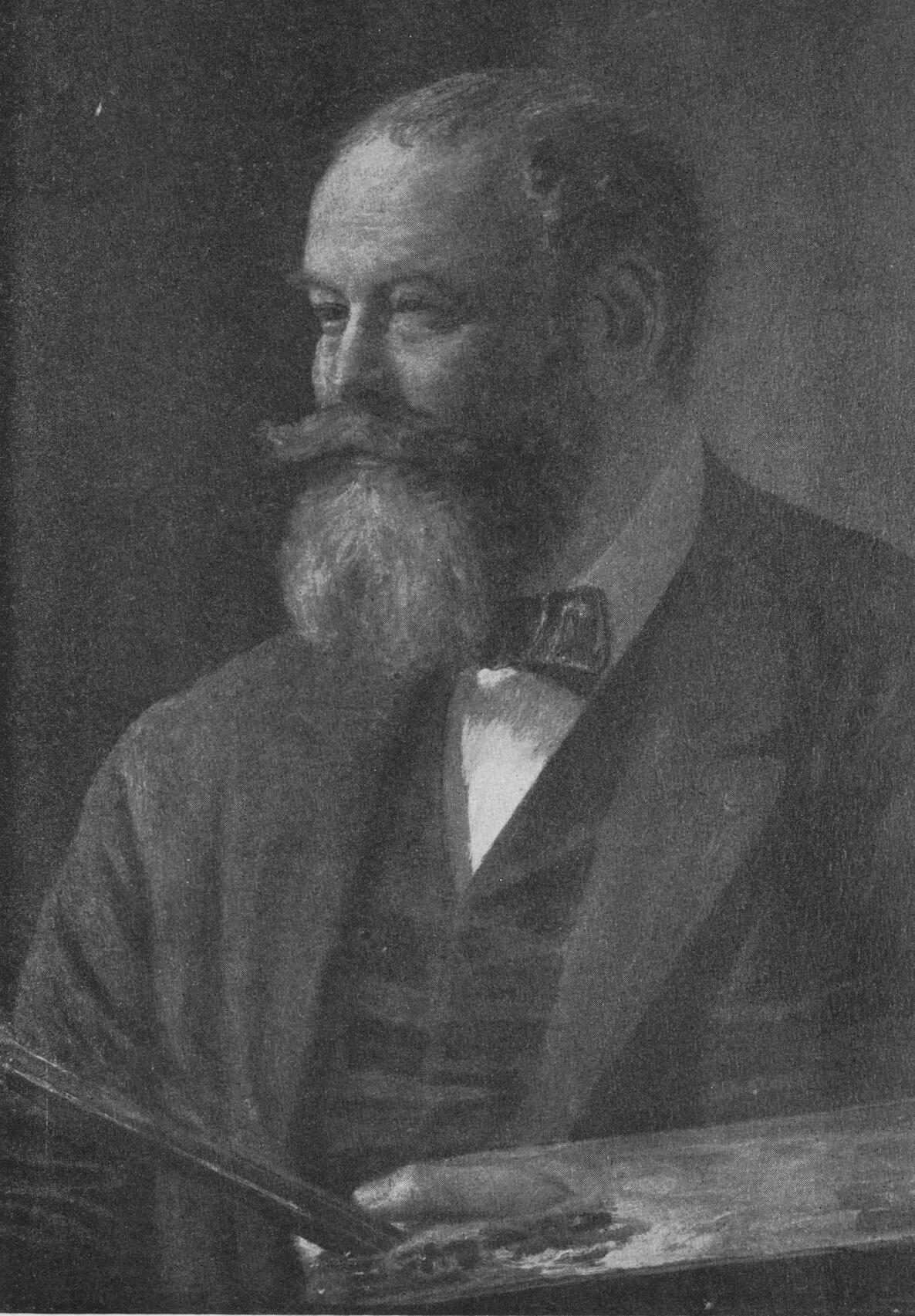
Self-portrait, by 1916

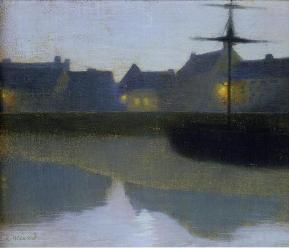
Twilight on the Canal (1894, oil on canvas)

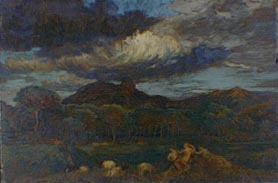
The Dryades

Émile-René Ménard (15 April 1862 – 13 January 1930) was a French painter. From early childhood he was immersed in an artistic environment: Corot, Millet and the Barbizon painters frequented his family home, familiarizing him thus with both landscape and antique subjects.

== Biography ==
Ménard was born on 15 April 1862 in Paris. He studied at the Académie Julian from 1880 after having been a student of Baudry, Bouguereau, and Henri Lehmann. He participated in the Salon of the Secession in Munich, and the Salon de la Libre Esthétique in Brussels during 1897. Several personal exhibitions were also devoted to him at the Georges Small Gallery. In 1904, he was appointed professor at the Académie de la Grande Chaumière, and in that year welcomed the rising young Russian painter Boris Kustodiev, age 26, in his art studio.

In 1921, he exhibited in the Twelfth Salon along with Henri Martin and Edmond Aman-Jean. Galleries in Buffalo, New York and Boston, Massachusetts exposed Ménard and his art to the United States. However, the numerous commissions that Ménard received from the French government crowned his career; for example, the cycle for the Hautes Etudes à la Sorbonne, the Faculté de Droit, and the fresco Atoms for the Chemistry institute, and finally the Caise des Dépôts in Marseille.

Ménard's art allies a rigorous, clear classicism with a diffuse and dreamlike brushwork. In 1894, Victor Soulier in L'Art et la Vie described Ménard's work as "visions of a pacified, bathed nature, of dawn and of twilight, where the soul seems to immerse itself in the innocence of daybreak, and breathe the divine anointment that comes with the dawn."

He died on 13 January 1930 in Paris.

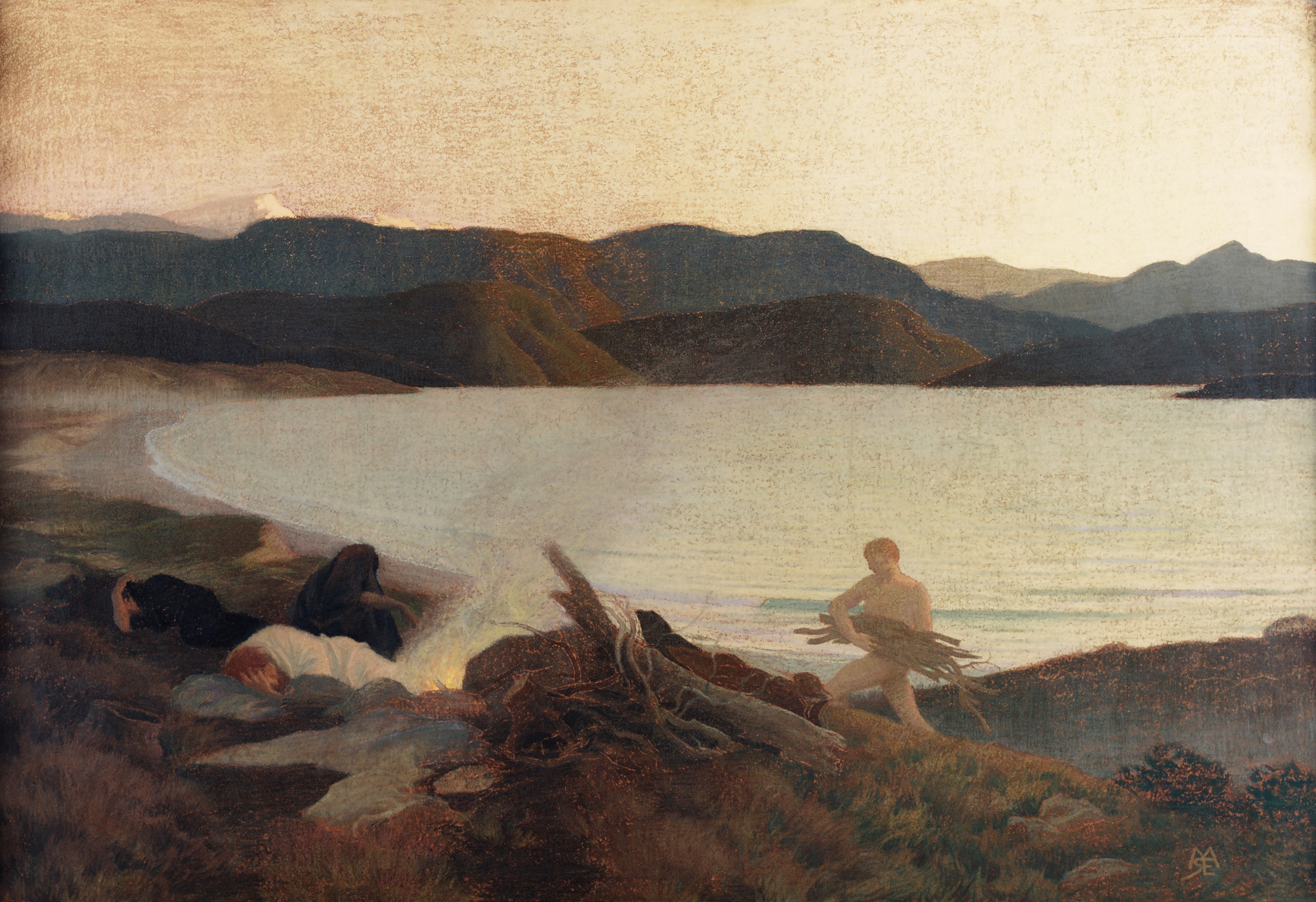
The Wanderers

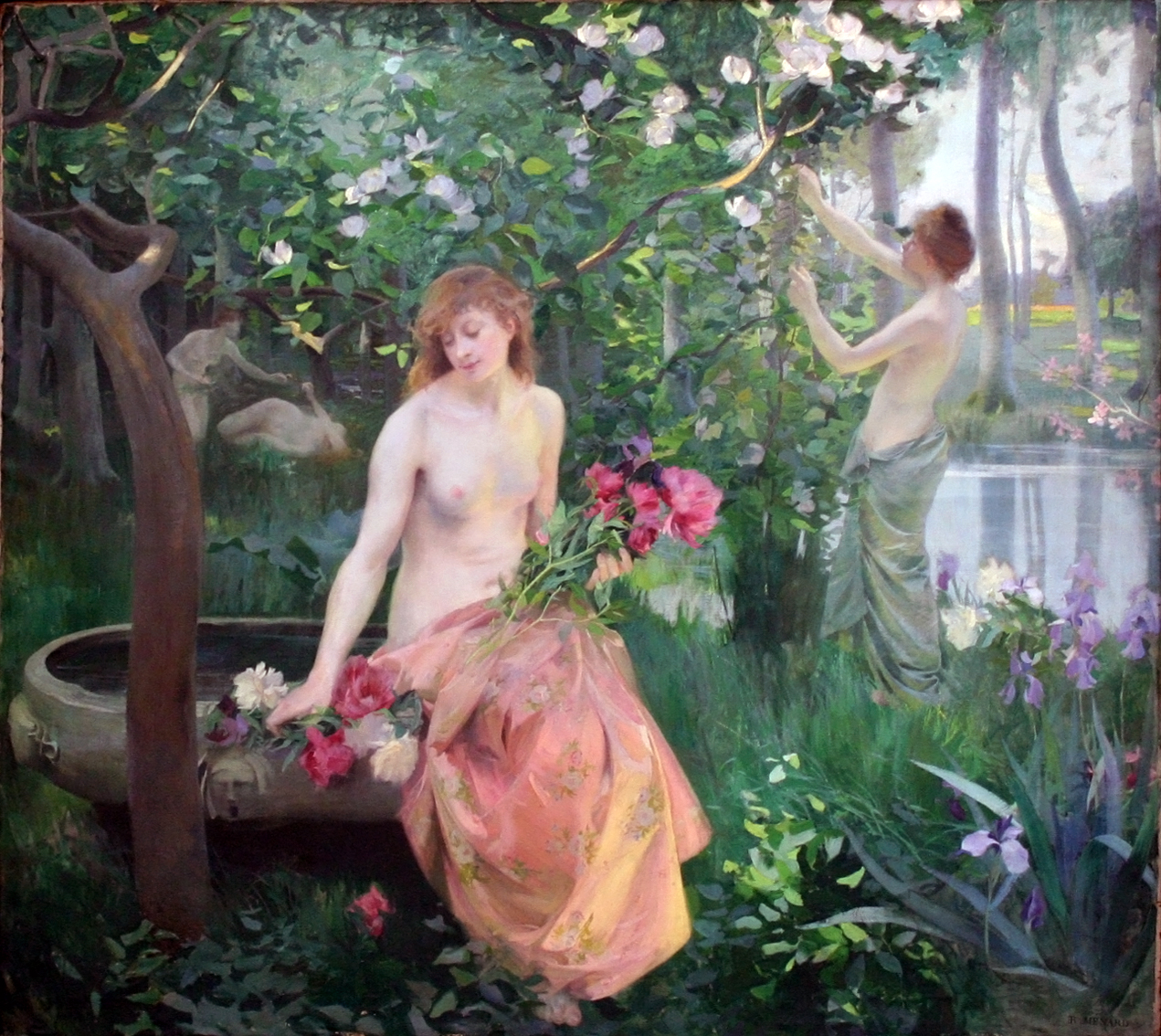
Spring

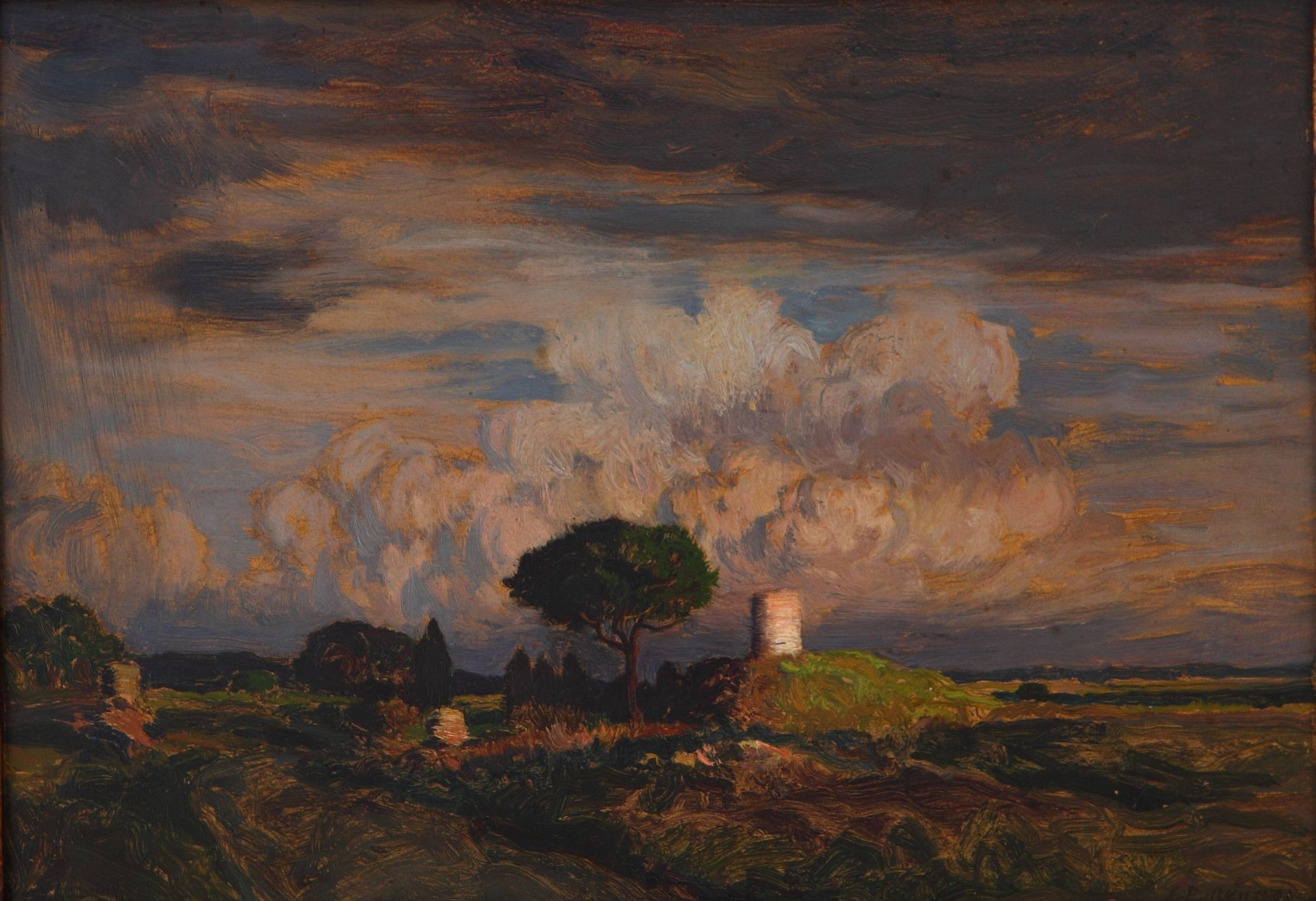
View of the Apennines

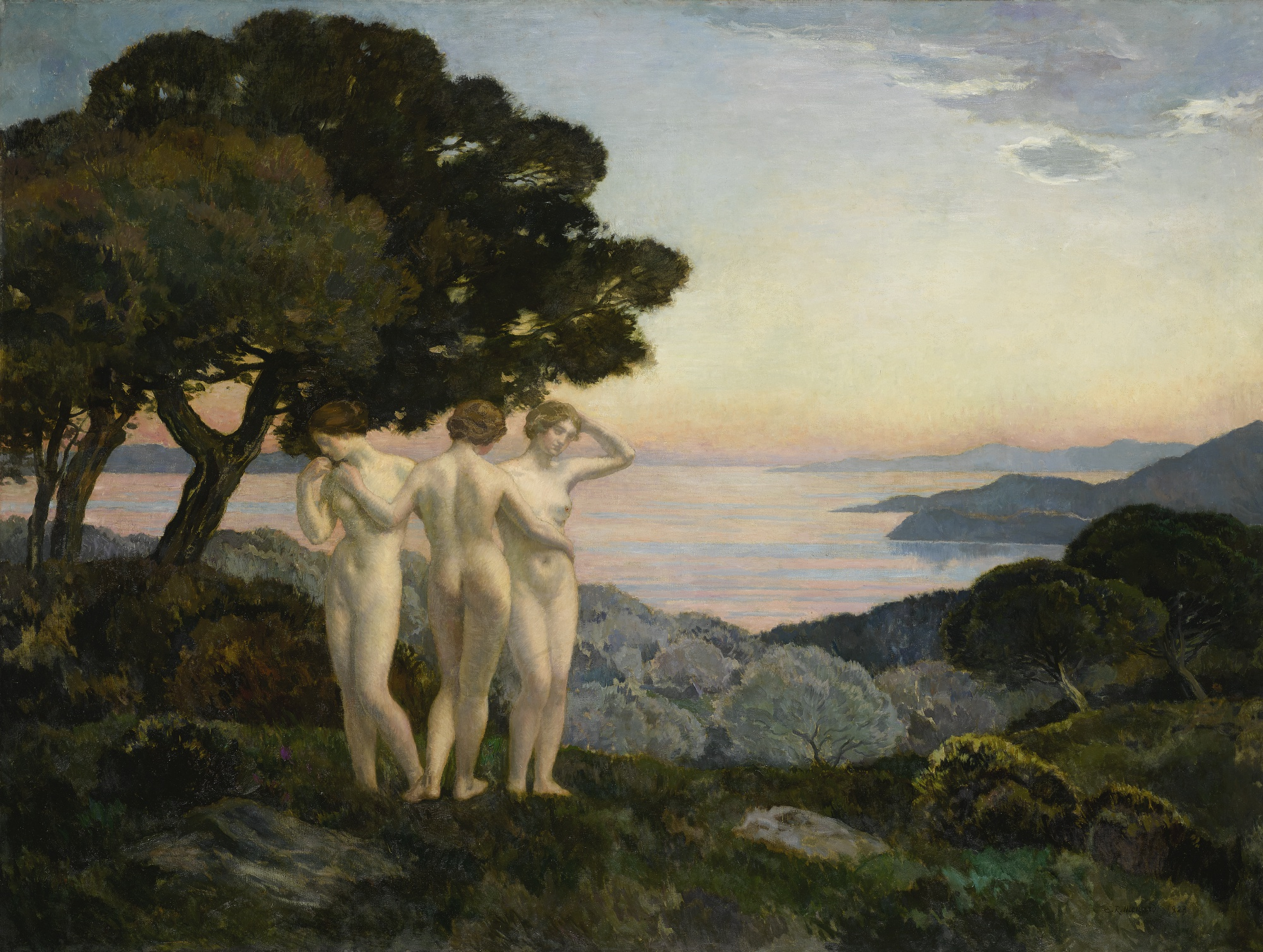
The Three Graces, 1923
