= Dauchez =

Dauchez is a French surname. Notable people with the surname include:

- Albert Dauchez, French Olympic archer
- André Dauchez (1870–1948), French artist
- Florence Dauchez (born 1964), French journalist and television host
- Jeanne Simon (artist) otherwise Dauchez or Simon-Dauchez (1869–1949), French artist

== See also ==
- Daucher
