= Carnegie Prize =

International art prize

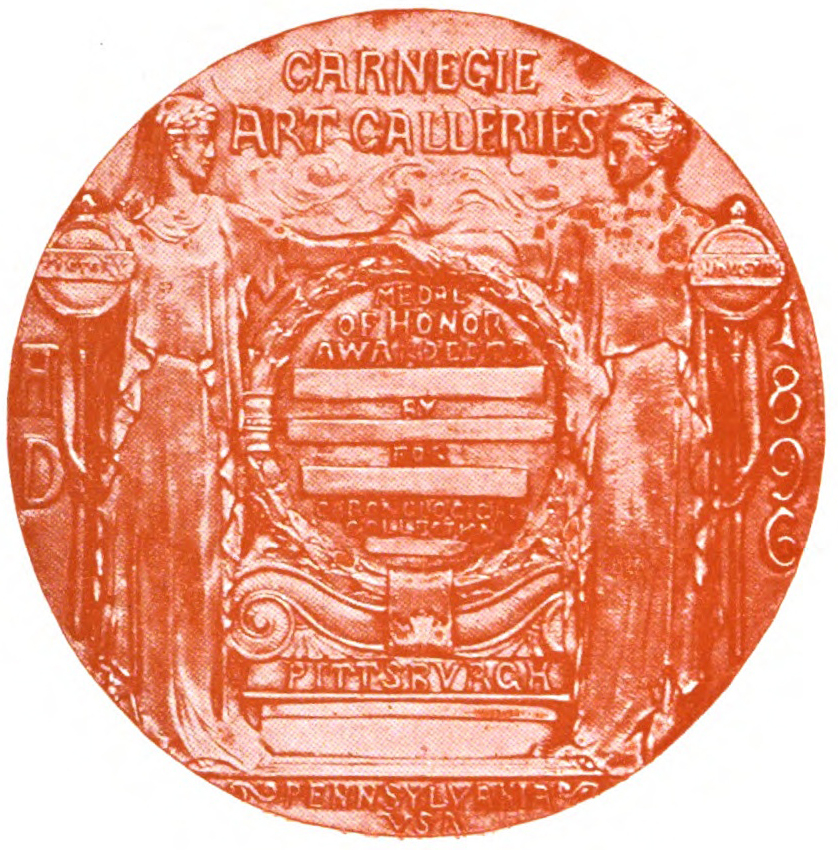
Carnegie Gold Medal of Honor (1896)

The Carnegie Prize is an international art prize awarded by the Carnegie Museum of Art in Pittsburgh, Pennsylvania. It currently consists of a $10,000 cash prize accompanied by a gold medal.

== History ==
The Carnegie Prize was established in 1896, to recognize the best painting shown in the first annual exhibition of the Museum of Art, Carnegie Institute. Unlike most American annual exhibitions, which were limited to artists born or resident in the United States, the Carnegie exhibitions were international. To attract top painters from home and abroad, the Carnegie exhibitions offered high cash prizes—$1,500 for the First Class winner, $1,000 for the Second-Class winner and $500 for the Third-Class winner. The First-Class winner's cash prize was accompanied by the Carnegie Gold Medal of Honor (1896), designed by Tiffany & Co. and cast by J.E. Caldwell & Co. Often, especially in the early years, the prize-winning painting was purchased for the museum's permanent collection.

The exhibition has undergone a series of name changes and transformations—adding a gold medal for sculpture (beginning in 1958), and going from a schedule of every year to every second or third year, and now, to every fourth or fifth year. The exhibitions in the late 1970s were retrospectives of established artists. In 1982, the exhibition was renamed the Carnegie International, and returned to its original mission of showing recent works by a host of artists. In 1985, the Carnegie Prize was refocused to recognize not just a single work of art but an honoree's entire body of work. In the 1990s, the exhibition expanded to include non-traditional artists and filmmakers.

As of 2019, 67 Carnegie Prizes had been awarded and one was refused (Irish painter Francis Bacon, 1967). The Spanish sculptor Eduardo Chillida was awarded it twice (1964 for an individual sculpture, 1979 for his body of work). American painter Cecilia Beaux was the first woman awarded the Carnegie Prize (1899); German sculptor Rebecca Horn was the second woman (1988). South African artist William Kentridge was the first filmmaker awarded it (1999). Documenta, the German contemporary art exhibition, was the only organization awarded the prize (1979). English artist Lynette Yiadom-Boakye was the first woman of color awarded the prize (2018).

The Carnegie International's prize should not be confused with the Carnegie Prize of the National Academy of Design, the Carnegie Prize of the Society of American Artists, the Carnegie Art Award (Sweden), or with the Carnegie Medal (literary award).

== List of Gold Medal winners ==
Year	Artist	Image	Work	Collection	Notes
Annual Exhibition at the Museum of Art, Carnegie Institute					$1,500 cash award accompanied the gold medal
1896; 1st	John Lavery; Ireland		Lady in Brown		
1897; 2nd	James Jebusa Shannon; United States		Miss Kitty	Carnegie Museum of Art, Pittsburgh, Pennsylvania	The artist's daughter and two dogs
1898; 3rd	Dwight William Tryon; United States		Early Spring in New England	Freer Gallery of Art, Washington, D.C.	
1899; 4th	Cecilia Beaux; United States		Mother and Daughter (Mrs. Clement Acton Griscom & Frances; Canby Griscom)	Pennsylvania Academy of the Fine Arts, Philadelphia, Pennsylvania	Gold Medal: 1900 Paris Exposition; 1900 Temple Gold Medal (PAFA) First woman awarded a Carnegie Prize. (The next was not until 1988.)
1900; 5th	André Dauchez; France		The Kelp Gatherers		
1901; 6th	Alfred H. Maurer; United States		An Arrangement	Whitney Museum of American Art, Manhattan, New York City	
1902; 7th	Exhibition of loaned works. No prizes awarded.				
1903; 8th	Frank Weston Benson; United States		A Woman Reading	Beverly Arts Association, Chicago, Illinois	
1904; 9th	Walter Elmer Schofield; United States		Across the River	Carnegie Museum of Art, Pittsburgh, Pennsylvania	
1905; 10th	Lucien Simon; France		Evening in a Studio	Iris & B. Gerald Cantor Center for Visual Arts, Stanford University, Stanford, California	
1906	No annual exhibition (due to museum expansion)				
1907; 11th	Gaston La Touche; France		The Bath		Ex collection: William S. Stimmel; Ex collection: University Club of Pittsburgh; Sold at Dargate Auction Galleries, Pittsburgh, 7 October 2017.
1908; 12th	Thomas W. Dewing; United States		The Necklace	Smithsonian American Art Museum, Washington, D.C.	
1909; 13th	Edmund C. Tarbell; United States		A Girl Crocheting	Arkell Museum, Canajoharie, New York	
1910; 14th	William Orpen; Ireland		Portrait of the Artist (Venus and Myself)	Carnegie Museum of Art, Pittsburgh, Pennsylvania	
1911; 15th	John White Alexander; United States		A Ray of Sunlight (The Cellist)	private collection	
1912; 16th	Charles Sims; England		Pastorella		Ex collection: William S. Stimmel
1913; 17th	Glyn Warren Philpot; England		The Marble Worker	Muskegon Museum of Art, Muskegon, Michigan	
1914; 18th	Edward Redfield; United States		The Village in Winter	Payne Gallery, Moravian College, Bethlehem, Pennsylvania	Ex collection: William S. Stimmel
1915–1919	No annual exhibitions (due to World War I)				
International Exhibition of Paintings, Carnegie Institute, Pittsburgh					Name change
1920; 19th	Abbot Henderson Thayer; United States		Young Woman in Olive Plush (Woman in Green Velvet)	Addison Gallery of American Art, Phillips Academy, Andover, Massachusetts	
1921; 20th	Ernest Lawson; United States		Vanishing Mist	Carnegie Museum of Art, Pittsburgh, Pennsylvania	
1922; 21st	George W. Bellows; United States		Elinor, Jean and Anna	Albright-Knox Art Gallery, Buffalo, New York	The artist's aunt, daughter and mother 1921 Beck Gold Medal (PAFA)
1923; 22nd	Arthur Bowen Davies; United States		Afterthoughts of Earth		
1924; 23rd	Augustus John; Wales		Madame Suggia	Tate Britain, London, UK	
1925; 24th	Henri Le Sidaner; France (born Mauritius)		Window on the Bay of Villefranche	Huntington Museum of Art, Huntington, West Virginia	
1926; 25th	Ker-Xavier Roussel; France		The Garden (The Garden Window)	Carnegie Museum of Art, Pittsburgh, Pennsylvania	
1927; 26th	Henri Matisse; France		Still Life: Bouquet and Compotier	Virginia Museum of Fine Arts, Richmond, Virginia	
1928; 27th	André Derain; France		Still Life	Carnegie Museum of Art, Pittsburgh, Pennsylvania	
1929; 28th	Felice Carena; Italy		La Scuola	Banca Monte dei Paschi Collection, Siena, Italy	
1930; 29th	Pablo Picasso; Spain		Portrait of Mme Picasso	private collection	
1931; 30th	Franklin C. Watkins; United States		Suicide in Costume	Philadelphia Museum of Art	Depicts a dead man in clown costume holding a smoking gun.
1932	No annual exhibition (due to severity of the Great Depression)				Cash award reduced from $1,500 to $1,000
1933; 31st	André Dunoyer de Segonzac; France		Saint-Tropez		
1934; 32nd	Peter Blume; United States (born Russia)		South of Scranton	Metropolitan Museum of Art	
1935; 33rd	Hipólito Hidalgo de Caviedes y Gómez; Spain		Elvira and Tiberio		Ex collection: Fine Arts Society of San Diego; Auctioned at Sotheby's NY, 18–19 November 1987
1936; 34th	Leon Kroll; United States		The Road from the Cove	private collection	
1937; 35th	Georges Braque; France		The Yellow Cloth (The Yellow Tablecloth)	private collection	
1938; 36th	Karl Hofer; Germany		The Wind	Detroit Institute of Arts, Detroit, Michigan	
1939; 37th	Alexander Brook; United States		Georgia Jungle	Carnegie Museum of Art, Pittsburgh, Pennsylvania	
1940–1949	No annual exhibitions (due to World War II). Instead, 9 exhibitions of American paintings.				
Pittsburgh International Exhibition of Contemporary Painting					Exhibition reorganized as a biennial Cash award increased to $2,000
1950; 38th	Jacques Villon; France		The Thresher		Villon was a Cubist painter, and the brother of Marcel Duchamp.
1951	No exhibition				
1952; 39th	Ben Nicholson; England		Azure	Carnegie Museum of Art, Pittsburgh, Pennsylvania	
1953 & 1954	No exhibitions				Exhibition reorganized as a triennial.
1955; 40th	Alfred Manessier; France		Crown of Thorns	Carnegie Museum of Art, Pittsburgh, Pennsylvania	
1956 & 1957	No exhibitions				
Pittsburgh International Exhibition of Contemporary Painting and Sculpture					Gold Medal for Sculpture added
1958; 41st Painting	Antoni Tàpies; Spain		Painting	Carnegie Museum of Art, Pittsburgh, Pennsylvania	
1958; 41st Sculpture	Alexander Calder; United States		Mobile: Pittsburgh	Pittsburgh International Airport	
1959 & 1960	No exhibitions				
1961; 42nd Painting	Mark Tobey; United States		Untitled	Carnegie Museum of Art, Pittsburgh, Pennsylvania	
1961; 42nd Sculpture	Alberto Giacometti; Switzerland		Walking Man 1	Carnegie Museum of Art, Pittsburgh, Pennsylvania	
1962 & 1963	No exhibitions				
Pittsburgh International Exhibition of Contemporary Art					"The traditional award structure of numbered prizes has been eliminated in favor of equal awards, four for painting and two for sculpture, each in the amount of $2,000."
1964; 43rd Painting	Ellsworth Kelly; United States		Blue, Black and Red		
1964; 43rd Painting	Victor Pasmore; England		Red Abstract No. 5	Bristol Museum & Art Gallery, Bristol, England.	
1964; 43rd Painting	Antonio Saura; Spain		Imaginary Portrait of Goya	Carnegie Museum of Art, Pittsburgh, Pennsylvania	
1964; 43rd Painting	Pierre Soulages; France		24 November '63	Carnegie Museum of Art, Pittsburgh, Pennsylvania	Meditation on the assassination of President John F. Kennedy
1964; 43rd Sculpture	Jean Arp; Germany		Sculpture Classique	Carnegie Museum of Art, Pittsburgh, Pennsylvania	
1964; 43rd Sculpture	Eduardo Chillida; Spain		Modulation d'espace II	Lehmbruck Museum, Duisburg, North Rhine-Westphalia, Germany	
1965 & 1966	No exhibitions				
1967; 44th Painting	Francis Bacon; Ireland				Bacon refused the prize.
1967; 44th Painting	Josef Albers; United States (born Germany)		Homage to the Square: Vernal	Carnegie Museum of Art, Pittsburgh, Pennsylvania	
1967; 44th Painting	Joan Miró; Spain		Queen Louise of Prussia	Carnegie Museum of Art, Pittsburgh, Pennsylvania	
1967; 44th Sculpture	Victor Vasarely; France (born Hungary)		Alom	Carnegie Museum of Art, Pittsburgh, Pennsylvania	
1968 & 1969	No exhibitions				
1970; 45th	No prizes awarded				
1971–1976	No exhibitions (due to construction of the Sarah Mellon Scaife Gallery).				
Pittsburgh International Series					Exhibition reorganized as a biennial retrospective of a single artist's body of work. $50,000 Andrew W. Mellon Prize awarded to honoree.
1977; 46th	Pierre Alechinsky; Belgium				
1978	No exhibition				
1979; 47th	Willem de Kooning; United States (born Netherlands)				$50,000 Andrew W. Mellon Prize split among 3 honorees
1979; 47th	Eduardo Chillida; Spain				
1979; 47th	Documenta II (1959), IV (1968) and VI (1977); Germany				International contemporary art exhibition held in Germany
1980 & 1981	No exhibitions				
Carnegie International Exhibition					Exhibition re-established as a triennial $10,000 Carnegie International Prize
1982; 48th	No prizes awarded				
1983 & 1984	No exhibitions				
1985; 49th Painting	Anselm Kiefer; Germany		Midgard	Carnegie Museum of Art, Pittsburgh, Pennsylvania	
1985; 49th Sculpture	Richard Serra; United States		Carnegie	Carnegie Museum of Art, Pittsburgh, Pennsylvania	
1986 & 1987	No exhibitions				
1988; 50th	Rebecca Horn; Germany		The Hydra Forest: Performing Oscar Wilde	San Francisco Museum of Modern Art	Assemblage of electrical devices, glass, coal and other objects Second woman awarded a Carnegie Prize.
1989 & 1990	No exhibitions				
1991; 51st	On Kawara; Japan		Date Paintings	Carnegie Museum of Art, Pittsburgh, Pennsylvania	
1992–1994	No exhibitions				
1995; 52nd Painting	Sigmar Polke; Germany		Hermes Trismegistos I-IV	De Pont Museum of Contemporary Art, Tilburg, North Brabant, Netherlands	
1995; 52nd Sculpture	Richard Artschwager; United States		Table Prepared in the Presence of Enemies	Carnegie Art Museum, Pittsburgh, Pennsylvania	
1996–1998	No exhibitions				
1999/2000; 53rd	William Kentridge; South Africa		Film: Stereoscope		First filmmaker awarded a Carnegie Prize.
2001–2003	No exhibitions				
2004/2005; 54th	Kutlug Ataman; Turkey		40-channel video installation: Kuba		Interviews with residents of Kuba, a shanty town in Istanbul.
2006 & 2007	No exhibitions				
2008; 55th "Life on Mars"	Vija Celmins; United States (born Latvia)		Night Sky #12	Carnegie Museum of Art, Pittsburgh, Pennsylvania	Third woman awarded a Carnegie Prize.
2009–2012	No exhibitions				
2013; 56th	Nicole Eisenman; France		Figure paintings and sculpture		Fourth woman awarded a Carnegie Prize.
2014–2017	No exhibitions				
2018; 57th	Lynette Yiadom-Boakye; England		Figure paintings and portraits		Fifth woman awarded a Carnegie Prize. First woman of color awarded a Carnegie Prize.

== See also ==
- Lists of art awards
- Prizes named after people
- Andrew Carnegie
