= Anna Milo Upjohn =

American painter (1868–1951)

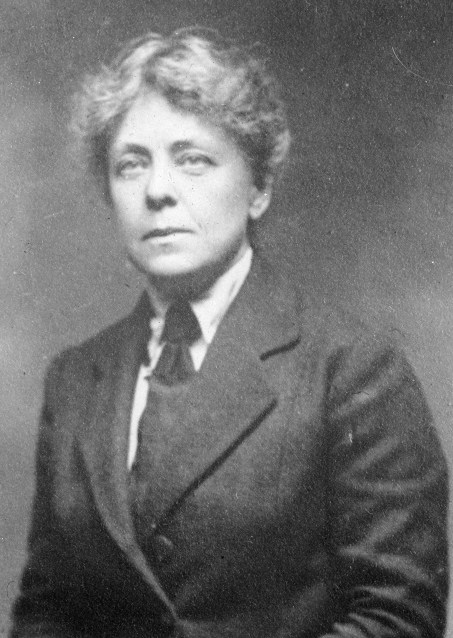
- Anna Milo Upjohn in 1921
- Born: October 31, 1868; Dover, New Jersey, US
- Died: December 4, 1951 (aged 83); New Milford, Connecticut, US

Anna Milo Upjohn (1868–1951) was an American artist, illustrator, author, and relief worker who, late in her long career, became known for paintings, drawings, and illustrations she made for the American Red Cross. After graduating from high school, she studied art briefly in New York but obtained most of her training in Paris from Claudio Castelucho and Lucien Simon. In the early years of the twentieth century, she became known both for her portraits and paintings of children and for her book and magazine illustrations. Finding herself in France at the outset of the First World War, she devoted herself to relief work first among the refugees in Paris and later among the devastated villages in France and Belgium. Having spent the first half of her adult life as an independent professional, she served as a staff artist for the American Red Cross between 1921 and 1931. She traveled extensively during her adult life and lived mostly in New York City; Ithaca, New York; and Washington, D.C.

== Early life and training ==
During the 1870s, Upjohn's family lived with her grandfather, a well-known architect named Richard Upjohn who had retired to a scenic home in Garrison, New York. Richard Upjohn's biographer says when she was about five she would accompany him as he sketched and painted. She questioned him about his color choices and learned that artists often chose colors different from the ones present in the subjects they painted. He also showed her engravings of famous paintings, explaining what made them great and where they fell short in his view. Her family was living in Fond du Lac, Wisconsin when she graduated from high school in 1887. A few years later, the family moved to New York, where, in the early 1890s, she took classes at the Cooper Union Woman's Art School. She began her foreign travels in 1893 and during the next few years studied art in Munich, Florence, and Paris. In 1902, she took an illustration class at the National Academy of Design and the following year won the Academy's Suydam silver medal for her work. Between 1909 and 1912, she studied and traveled in Europe's other major cities. In 1922, Upjohn told a reporter that she had studied art "in many places, usually for a few months at a time and disconnectedly, but what counted most was the work she did in Paris under Castelucho and Lucien Simon.” Born in Barcelona, Castelucho's birth name was Claudi Catelucho Diana, but he went by his surname alone. In Paris during the early years of the twentieth century, he and Simon both trained private students and both taught at two mondernist alternatives to the École des Beaux Arts: the Académie Colarossi and the Académie de la Grande Chaumière. Upjohn did not say whether she took private lessons, classes, or both.

== Career in art ==
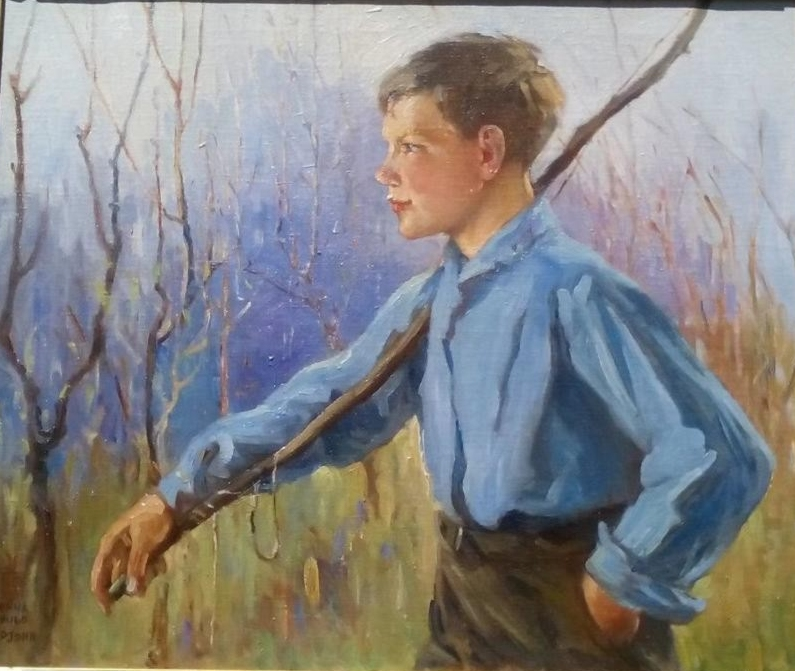
Image No. 1, Anna Milo Upjohn, Young Boy Going Fishing, 1910, oil on canvas, 25 x 30 inches

In 1890, at the age of twenty-one, Upjohn completed a painting of angels for St. Paul's Episcopal Cathedral in Fond du Lac, Wisconsin. Her uncle Richard M. Upjohn had designed the building and her father was currently its rector (having succeeded John Henry Hobart Brown his brother-in-law). Reporting on the installation of the painting, a local journalist said the angels were "finely executed." The following year, she completed another painting for the cathedral. Measuring eight by fourteen feet, it depicted adoring saints and was placed in the cancel. A local reporter said it reflected "great credit upon the artist." In 1896, Upjohn had a portrait accepted for display in the autumn exhibition at the National Academy of Design. Called an "uncompromising portrait of a lady" by a local critic, the painting was the first of her formal portraits to gain recognition. A decade later, she told a reporter she was particularly proud to be included in this show. During travels to paint and study art in Europe in the 1890s, Upjohn participated in exhibitions held in Baden Baden, Paris, and Munich. In 1901, she showed paintings of children in a solo exhibition held at the gallery of the Kilohana Art League in Honolulu, Hawaii. Reviewing the show, a local critic said "One can be sanely and intelligently enthusiastic over Miss Anna M. Upjohn's child pictures. Anything more ideally perfect in this line than her "Children" and "A Child" is hard to find. Her work is unusually bold. Upjohn traveled to paint and study again during the years between 1900 and 1914. In 1910, she made a characteristic painting of a cheerful boy carrying a fishing pole (see Image No. 1, above).

She was living in Brooklyn in 1912 when she executed a commission from Cornell alumni for a portrait of her uncle, Charles Babcock, a professor of architecture (emeritus) at the university. At this time, she became a member of the MacDowell Club of New York and participated one of the club's exhibitions in 1913. Reviewing this show, a critic for the New York Times singled out a painting of Scandinavian children for its good characterization and "freshness and force of color". During the next few years, Upjohn contributed frequently to MacDowell club exhibitions. In 1914, the prestigious International Studio art magazine reproduced two paintings from a then-current exhibition and its critic called her "one of the best contributors lately at the MacDowell Club". The following year, a critic for the Brooklyn Daily Eagle said a painting of a child seen in a club exhibition was "one of the strongest and best types of youngsters in paint, which can be imagined." During these pre-war years, she also exhibited at the Grand Central, Knoeller, Macbeth, and Anderson Galleries in New York.

Subjects of commissioned formal portraits in this period include Helen Van Vechten, maker of fine-press books; A. Cameron MacKenzie, president of Elmira College; General George Wood Wingate an early leader of the National Rifle Association and founder of a NY boys' club; Mary Williams, an Ithaca matriarch; and notables connected with Cornell University, including Andrew Dickson White, a historian and one of the founders of the university, Louis Agassiz Fuertes, an ornithologist, illustrator and artist, and the anatomist Charles Rupert Stockard.

When she gave a solo exhibition at the Cornell College of Architecture in 1913, the local paper called her work "captivating" and said a painting of a Portuguese fisher girl gave "true joy" in its "fresh execution". Another solo show, this time at the Arnot Gallery of Elmira College, was said to be a "beautiful exhibit" of portraits and paintings of children. In 1915, a Wisconsin seed company bought a painting she had made of her six-year-old sister at work in a garden. The company made posters of the painting to use as promotional materials.

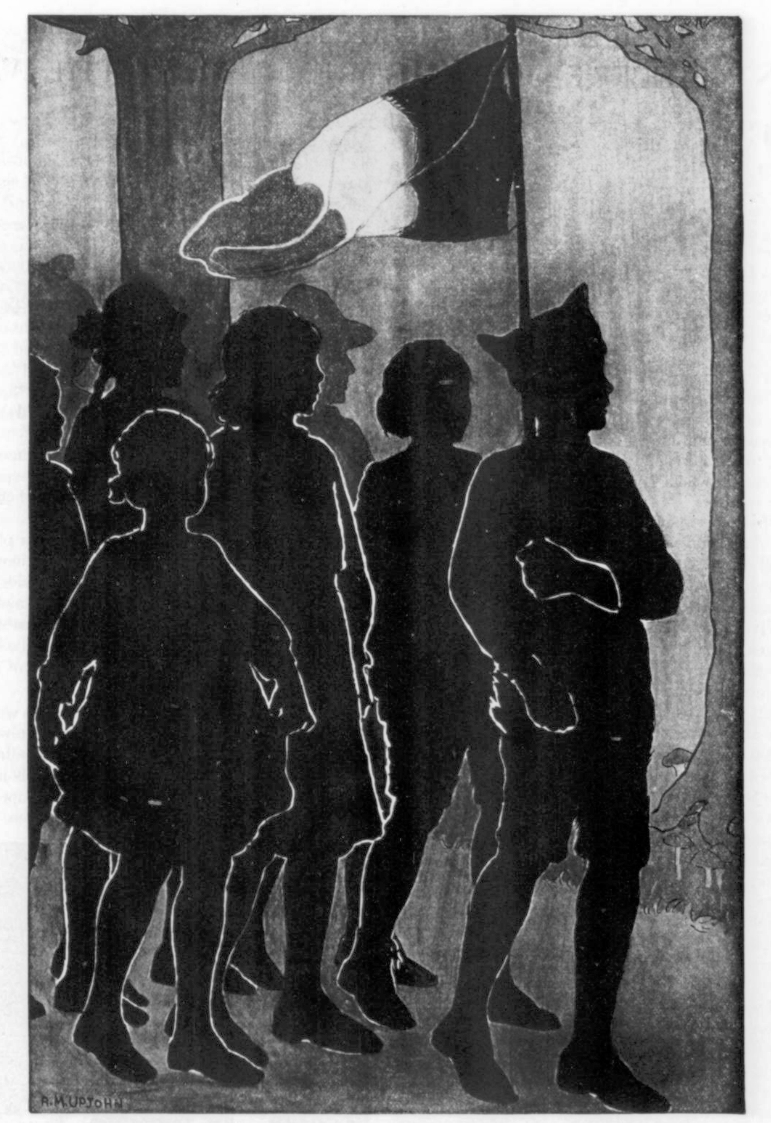
Image No. 2, Anna Milo Upjohn, Traversez la Vie Comme des Petits Soldats Garçons et Filles, illustration, Junior Red Cross News, September 1919

Upjohn's career changed abruptly at the outbreak of the First World War. Happening to be in Paris when war was declared, she volunteered her services to the local American Episcopal church in its efforts to help the refugees who poured into the city. On her return to New York in 1915, she solicited funds to support relief organizations and sold her drawings and paintings to raise money for them. She returned to France in 1916 and spent most of her time doing relief work there and in Belgium during the rest of the war. When, in 1917, the Paris-based Children's Bureau of the American Red Cross (ARC) asked her to make paintings for a series of health posters, she was reluctant to take time away from her relief work but she made five canvases for them all the same. In 1919, Upjohn visited war-devastated countries to make drawings and paintings for the Junior Red Cross (JRC). The ARC had set up the American Junior Red Cross in 1917 with three main objectives: to educate American children about the war and its impact on European children, to obtain donations of clothing and other goods, and to solicit donations for relief work. Upjohn's role was to make works of art depicting European children in a favorable light: cheerful and friendly despite their difficult circumstances. In September 1919, a striking drawing by Upjohn appeared in the first issue of the ARC's Junior Red Cross News with the caption, "This picture of boys and girls of France, with their beloved Tricolor, served as a poster in the Child Welfare Exhibits held in various cities of France a few months ago by the Children’s Bureau of the American Red Cross. It is the work of Miss Anna Milo Upjohn, a New York portrait painter, with the American Red Cross in Europe." See Image No. 2, above.

Upjohn's career reached another turning point in 1921 when she joined the JRC as a staff artist. She was then 53. Her professional career had begun thirty years earlier and would continue another two decades. Her new position gave her financial stability and welcome opportunities to travel. It did not prevent her from continuing to make and exhibit her paintings and drawings. In 1921, the Corcoran Gallery in Washington, D.C. mounted a solo exhibition of drawings she had made in Europe while on assignment for the JRC. Reproductions of the drawings had previously been printed in issues of Junior Red Cross News and, in announcing the exhibition, the journal's editor had restated the organization's objective as giving American children "an intelligent, sympathetic understanding" of the children in war-torn European countries. The show generated considerable publicity in Washington with one critic saying Upjohn had "presented not only the pathetic, but the humorous, and has in many instances given her sketches the homely touch which makes for universal appeal." Subsequently put on tour across the country, the drawings continued to draw critical notice, including a comment that the drawings showed a "homely touch" making for "universal appeal". Early in 1923, Upjohn visited the American West for the JRC to sketch Indian children and later that year the organization sent her on a tour around the world from west to east. After her arrival in Honolulu, a reporter described her child studies as "authoritative" and effective in achieving the JRC's goals of sympathy and understanding. On her return to the United States, the Maryland Institute in Baltimore exhibited a large number of her drawings from East- and Southeast Asia as well as Western, Eastern, and Southern Europe, the collection showing, as one critic said, "not pictures of children suffering, but happy childhood under varying conditions of life".

In 1935, the Cronyn & Lowndes Gallery in Manhattan gave Upjohn an exhibition of her paintings, including both formal portraits and informal child studies. Writing in the New York Times, the critic, Howard Devree, saw "competent, honest work rather on the conventional side". Another critic noted the significance of the formal portraits but said the child studies were the most interesting element in the show.

Upjohn resigned her position at the Junior Red Cross in 1931, but she continued to make drawings for its publications. During the 1930s, the ARC continued to tour exhibitions of her paintings, watercolors, and drawings to public libraries and other exhibition spaces throughout the United States. In Mansfield, Ohio, the local newspaper headlined Upjohn as a "Famous Artist" whose work appeared in ARC posters, JRC literature, and other media.

Exhibitions of Upjohn's paintings and drawings were less frequent from 1940 onward and the last may have been the one held in the public library of Somerset, Pennsylvania, in June 1945.

=== Artistic style ===
Upjohn trained as both artist and illustrator. She attracted most critical notice for her portraits and other paintings and invariably put "artist" when asked to give her occupation. She painted in oil on canvas; made gouache, watercolor, and wash drawings; and often worked in charcoal or crayon. She was best known for her formal portraits and informal depictions of children. She also made paintings of religious subjects and some landscapes.

Critics discussed the quality of her portraits without commenting on style. One called an early portrait "uncompromising". Another rated her portrait of John van Benschoten one of the "strongest" in the exhibition where it appeared. (The sitter was probably a brother of Upjohn's close friend, Augusta K. van Benschoten.) Her portrait of a woman named Elizabeth Spencer was said to be "well posed and fluent". Two of her portraits, one showing Andrew Dickson White and the other Louis Agassiz Fuertes were claimed to be "two of the best in the possession of Cornell University".

Her informal portraits of children and other works drew relatively few comments on style. On an exhibition of drawings held in Boston in 1921, a critic said, "The drawings were made, sometimes with charcoal, sometimes with colored crayon. The best, as so often happens, are those produced with most evident haste and spontaneity. Here and there one notes a little of that elaboration that takes the crisp edge off. In general, however, the childish forms are drawn with a taut, nervous line and with brisk indication of planes and attachments." In 1935, Howard Devree of the New York Times commented on the pastel effects she achieved, "despite use of a palette knife, through harmonizing of colors". Another critic noted that Upjohn's informal portraits were usually done outdoors and almost never in her studio.

== Illustrator ==
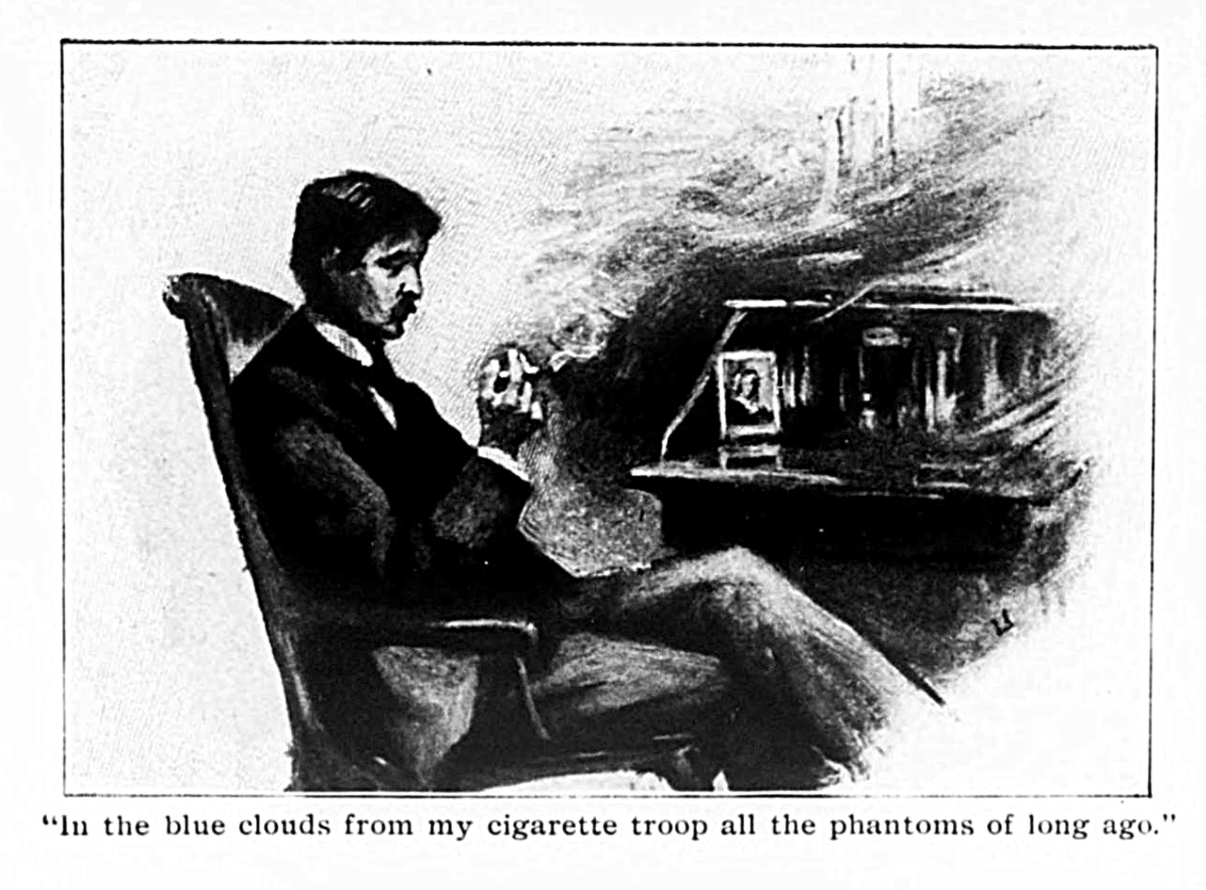
(3) Anna Milo Upjohn, Blue Clouds from My Cigarette, illustration from "Chiffonette", Ainslee's Magazine, v. 4, n. 6, Jan. 1900

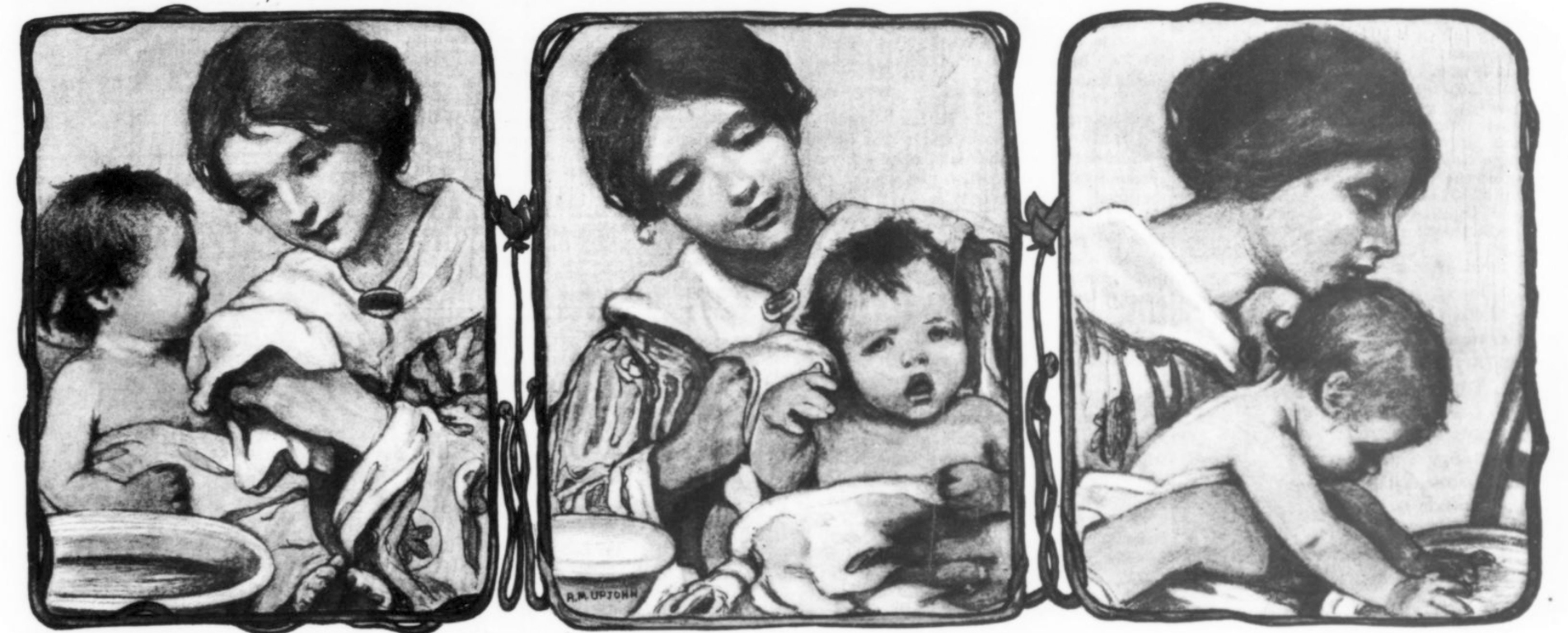
(4) Anna Milo Upjohn, "Chasing Little Speck-O'-Dirt", illustration from The Youth's Companion, v. 83, n. 13, p. 161

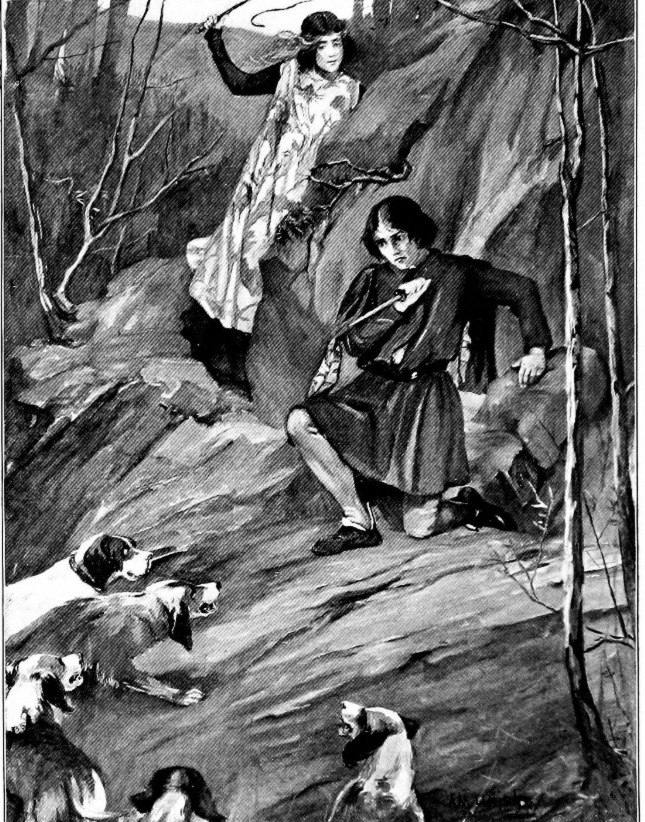
(5) Anna Milo Upjohn, The Devotion of Elisabetta, illustration from Count Falcon of the Eyrie by Clinton Scollard (New York, James Pott, 1903)

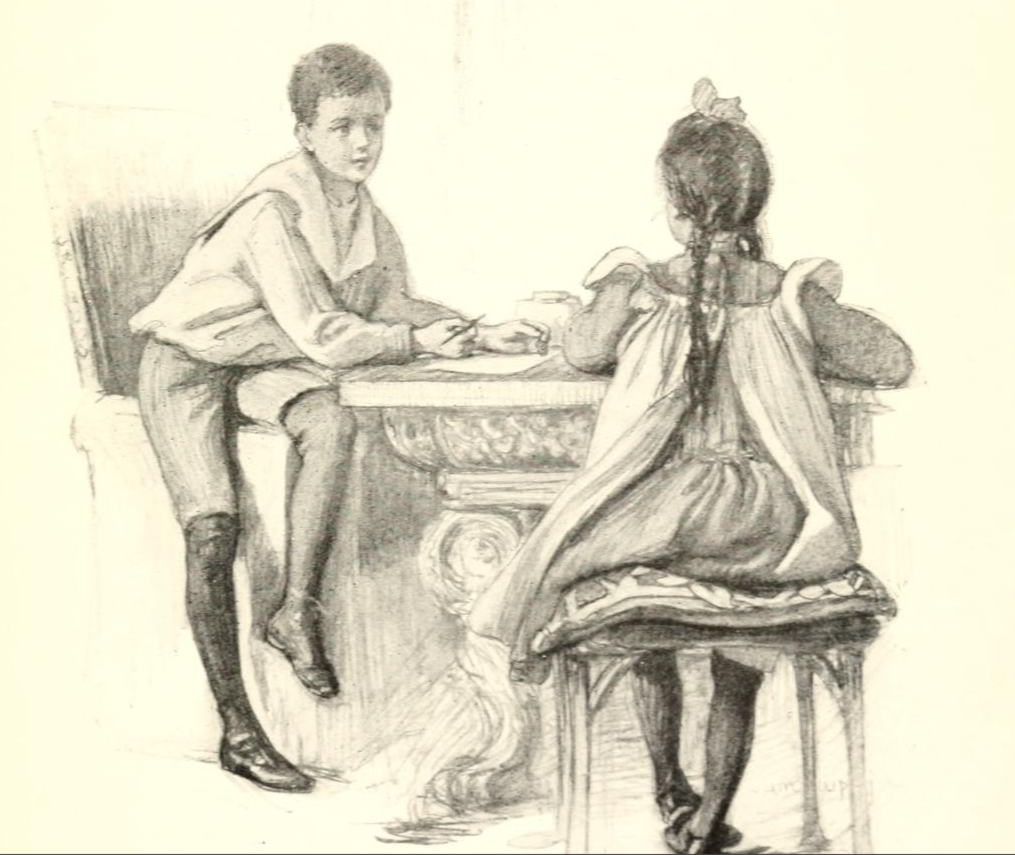
(6) Anna Milo Upjohn, Jack and Jill Writing Invitations to the Race, illustration from Some Adventures of Jack and Jill by Barbara Yechton (New York, Dodd, Mead & Co., 1905) p. 21

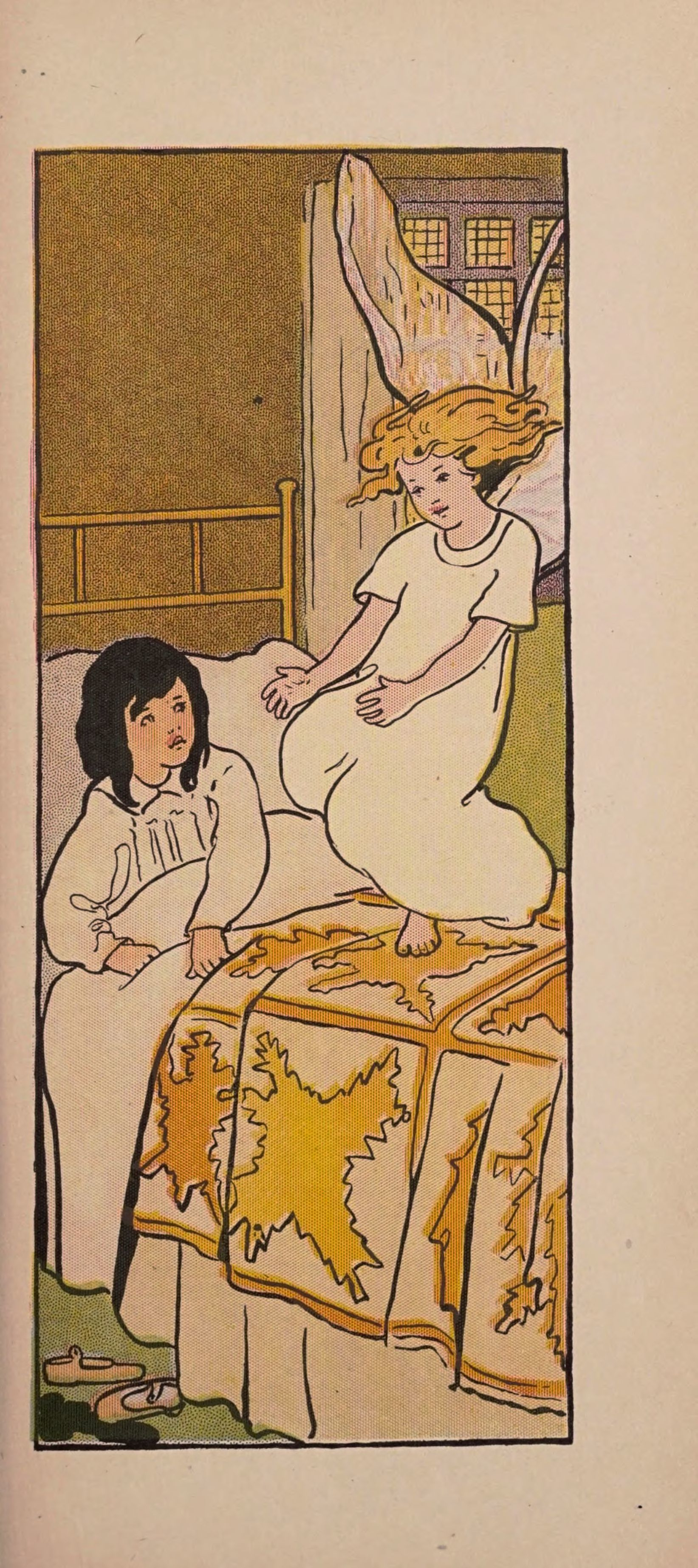
(7) Anna Milo Upjohn, Christmas Fairy, illustration fromSnuggy Bedtime Stories (New York, Frederick A. Stokes Co., 1906), p. 109

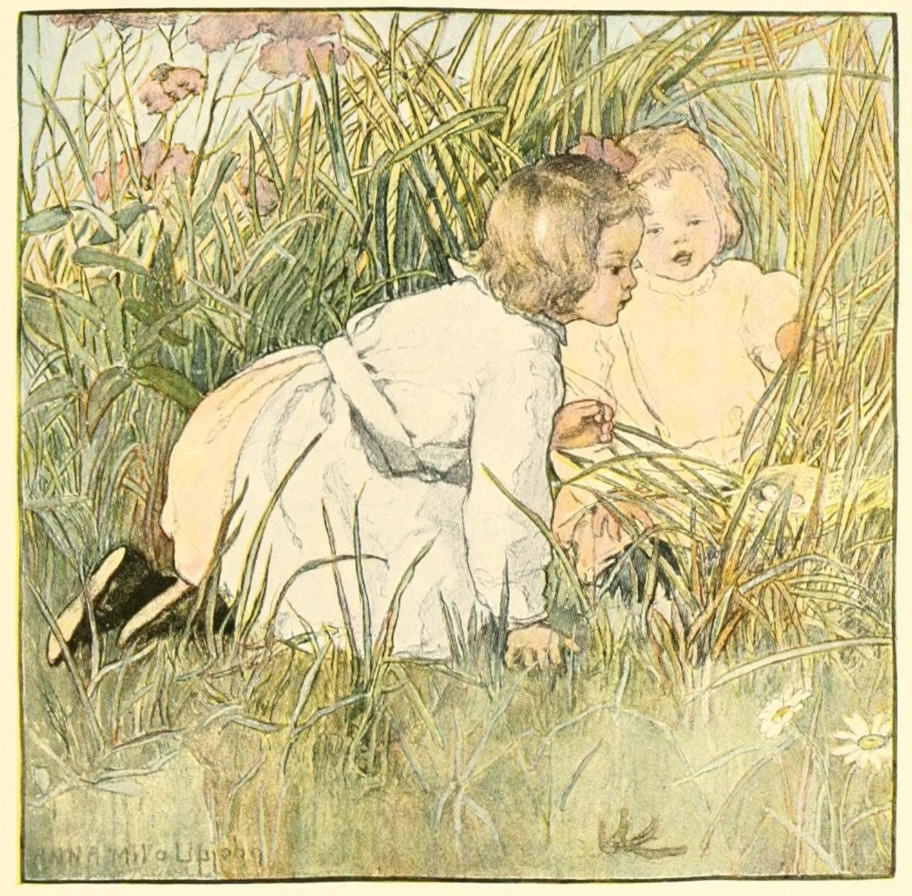
(8) Anna Milo Upjohn, The Book, illustration from Fresh Posies by Abbie Farwell Brown (New York, Houghton Mifflin Co., 1908), p. 153

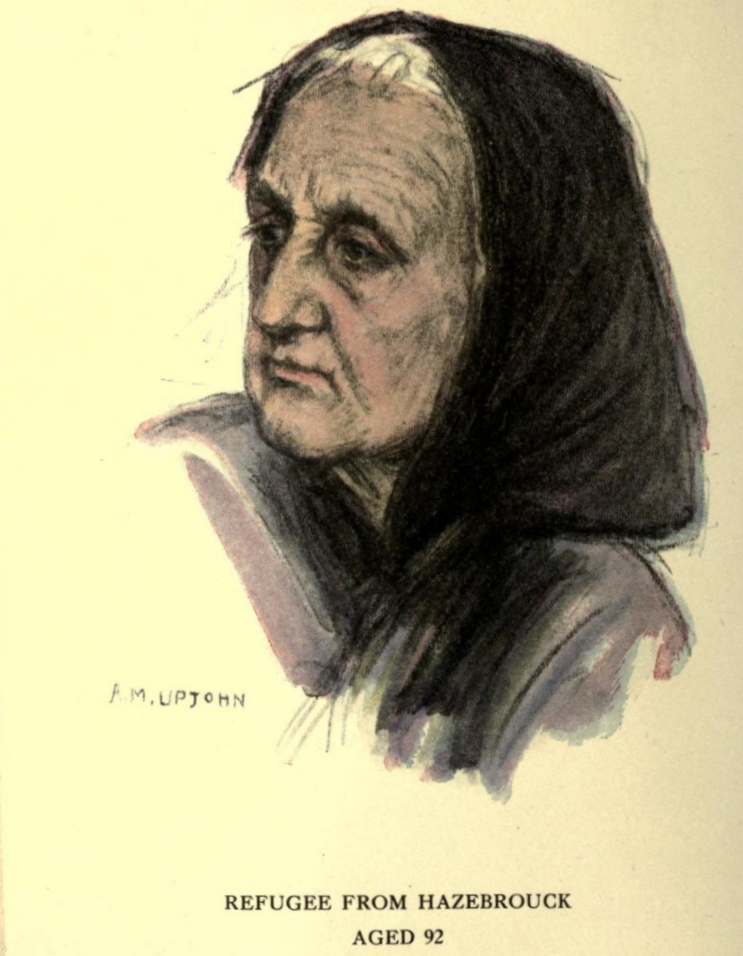
(9) Anna Milo Upjohn, Refugee from Hazebrouck, illustration from Helping France by Ruth Gaines (New York, E.P. Dutton Co., 1919), frontispiece

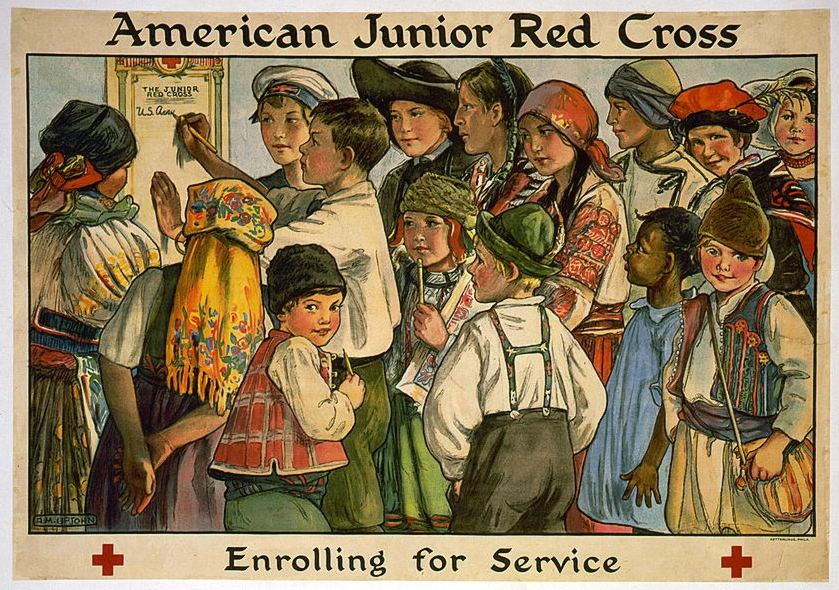
(10) Anna Milo Upjohn, Enrolling for Service, poster created for the Junior Red Cross, 1919

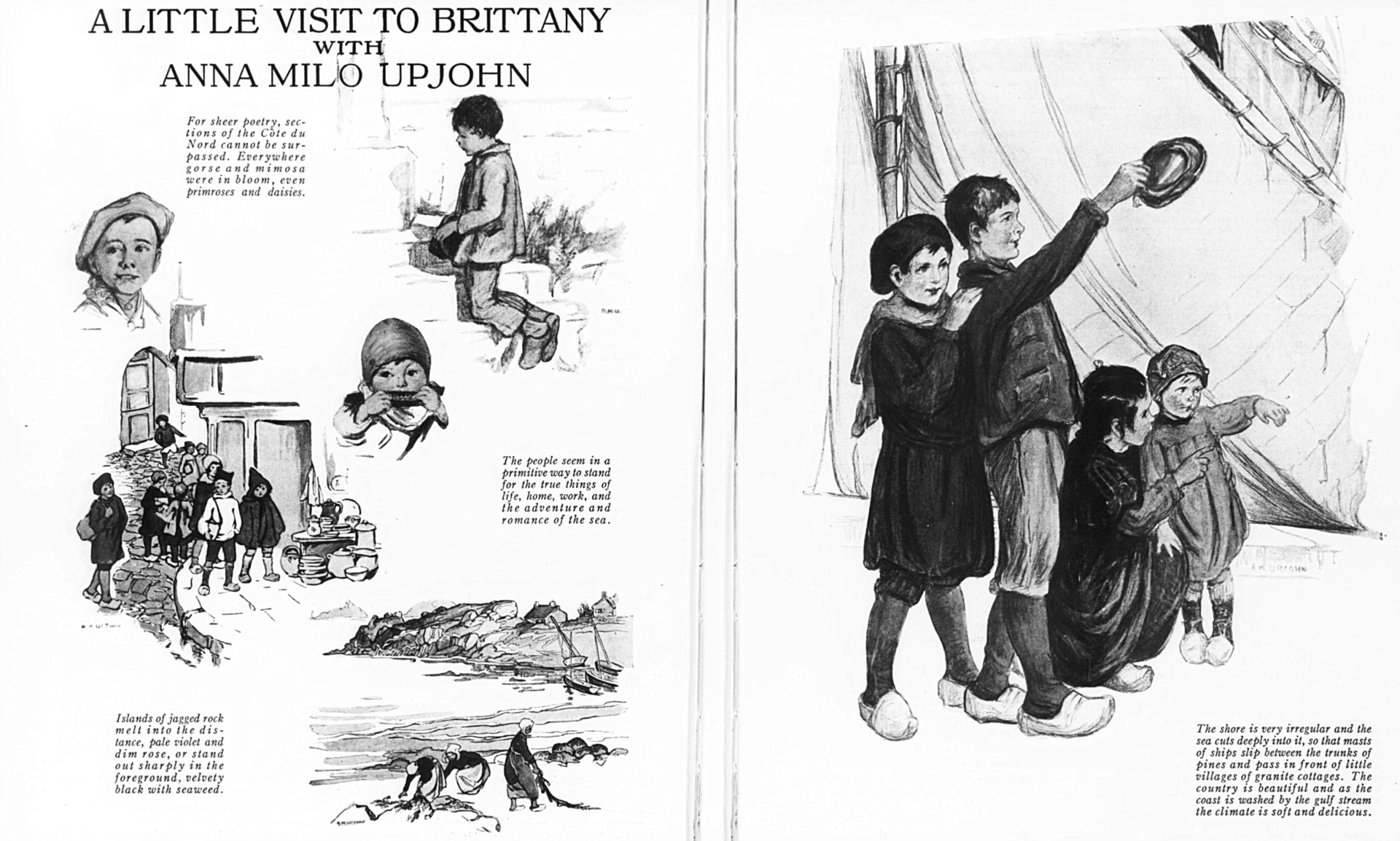
(11) Anna Milo Upjohn, A Little Visit to Brittany with Anna Milo Upjohn, from Junior Red Cross News, v. 1, n. 8, pp. 8-9

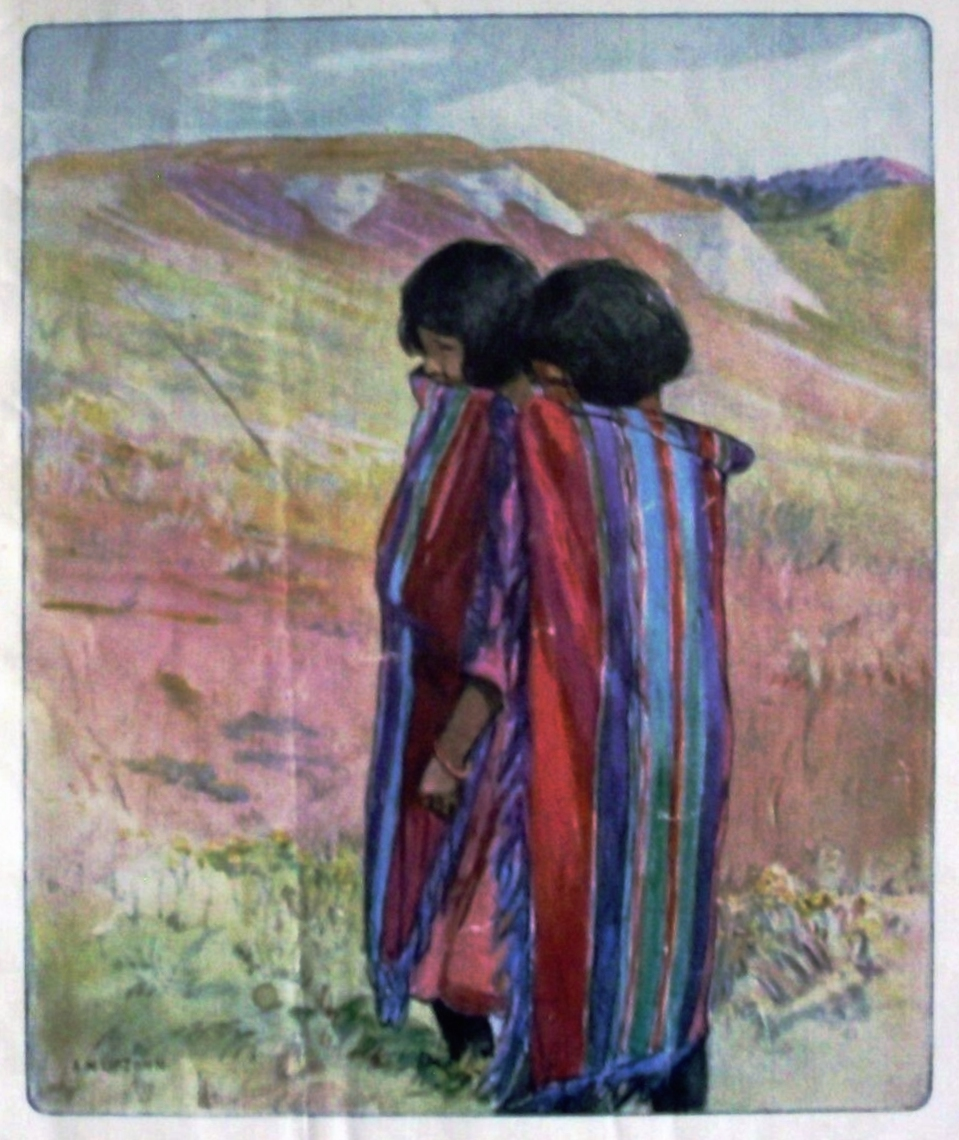
(12) Anna Milo Upjohn, Cheyenne Girls from School, illustration on cover of Junior Red Cross News v. 7, n. 9, May 1926

Upjohn's career as an illustrator paralleled her career as a professional artist. During her years as an employee of the American Red Cross, she made illustrated articles and stories that appeared in Red Cross publications and she made original paintings and drawings that were subsequently used as illustrations. Before then, she worked as a freelance illustrator. Her commissions came mainly from book publishers and magazines and occasionally from calendar publishers. She depicted children almost exclusively. In 1900, she illustrated a story by William Le Queux that appeared in the January issue of Ainslee's Magazine. Called "Chiffonette", the story was a romantic tale of thwarted love between a would-be artist and the eponymous "Chiffonette", a lady who was his "ideal of womanly virtue, truth, and beauty". See Image No. 3, above having the caption, "In the blue clouds from my cigarette troop all the phantoms of long ago". In 1909, she illustrated a poem by the progressive children's author, Emilie Poulsson. Called "Chasing Little Speck-O'-Dirt" the three-part picture appeared in The Youth's Companion and is shown above, see Image No. 4.

Two years later, she illustrated a book by Clinton Scollard called Count Falcon of the Eyrie, a historical romance about a brave hero and high-spirited heroine set in Renaissance Italy. See Image No. 5, above entitled "The Devotion of Elizabetta". In 1905, she illustrated a book by Barbara Yechton, pseudonym of prolific children's author, Lyda Farrington Krause. Entitled Some Adventures of Jack and Jill and comprised stories of children on a West Indian island, it received an admiring and quite long review in the New York Tribune. See Image No. 6, above entitled "Jack and Jill Writing Invitations for the Race".

In 1906 and 1907, she illustrated four books that were published by the innovative publisher, Frederick A. Stokes. Two of them had Christmas themes and appeared in the distinctive tall and narrow format of Stokes's "Christmas Stocking Series". Both were by John Howard Jewett and both appeared in 1906. The first, Snuggy Bedtime Stories, featured monkeys getting into wild scrapes and the second, Little Christmas, contained stories appropriate to the Christmas season. See Image No. 7, above entitled "The Little Christmas Fairy". The third and fourth books were printed in the more usual children's book format. They were The Would-Be Witch (1906), about a girl whose spells constantly go awry, and The House of the Red Fox (1907), about a motherless girl whose aunt keeps her at work when other children are out playing, both by Miriam Byrne, who was only eighteen when she wrote the first of them.

In 1908, she illustrated a book by Abbie Farwell Brown called Fresh Posies: Rhymes to Read and Pieces to Speak. In a brief review, a critic for the New York Times said Upjohn's work was "delightful". See Image No. 8, above entitled "The Book". Later that year, her illustrations appeared in a book by Clara Louise Burnham called The Quest Flower about a young girl who applies simple tenets of Christian Science to reconcile two estranged members of her family and heal a crippled playmate. Both books were published by Houghton, Mifflin, New York. Four years later, she illustrated another of Barbara Yechton's books, this one, called Two Young Americans about a boy who was raised in Canada but now living in the United States and an American girl who helps him overcome his anti-American prejudice.

Upjohn contributed illustrations to two books after she became an American Red Cross employee. The first was Helping France and the second Ladies of Grécourt. Published in 1919 and 1920, respectively, they both described the work of the Smith College Relief Unit in war-torn France; both had Ruth Gaines, a travel writer and relief worker, as author; and both were published by E. P. Dutton. See Image No. 9, above entitled "Refugee from Hazebrouck".

In 1919, the Red Cross put together a traveling exhibition of images of the health posters that the Red Cross had made from Upjohn's paintings and began circulating newly made posters that publicized the newly formed Junior Red Cross and encouraged children to join up. One of these posters, "Enrolling for Service" is shown above, Image No. 10. At this time her silhouette drawing of French children was reproduced in the first issue of Junior Red Cross News (shown above, Image No. 1).

During the decade she served as a staff artist for the Junior Red Cross, Upjohn produced illustrations, many in color, for its magazine and its other publications. The two-page spread in the May 1920 issue of Junior Red Cross News (shown above, Image No. 11) was one of her first contributions to the magazine. Containing sketches made in Brittany, it showed children in a seaport setting and contained a caption stating, "The people seem in a primitive way to stand for the true things of life, home, work, and the adventure and romance of the sea." Her cover picture for the May 1926 issue of Junior Red Cross News (shown above, Image No. 12 entitled "Cheyenne Girls from School" is an example of her work in color for the magazine. Her contributions of artwork and original stories continued until the mid-1930s and occurred less frequently thereafter.

== Writer ==
Image No. 13, Anna Milo Upjohn, An Albanian Story-Teller, illustration from Friends in Strange Garments (New York, Houghton Mifflin Co., 1927)

For much of her career, Upjohn wrote stories and nonfiction articles for children, mostly as a Red Cross employee and mostly for Junior Red Cross News. She also wrote poetry, news reports, and letters to the editor of newspapers. In 1913, she published a moody poem about a "ragged sheep" that "gropes uncertain in the night" to find its fold across a desolate moor. Called "At Dawn", it appeared in a late-fall issue of Collier's magazine. Two years later, she wrote a poem that appeared in the features sections of some American newspapers. Called "Aftermath", it described the remorse of an old seaman now living as a hermit deep in a forest. Without naming his infamous action, the poem made clear that it concerned the Sinking of the RMS Lusitania in May of that year. The issue of Junior Red Cross News for March 1922 contained a poem of hers, with illustration, about a boy seated high in a tree pretending he is on a sailing ship that is being blown from Winter into Spring.

Upjohn's war reporting began with publication in local newspapers of extracts from her letters to relatives at home. In January 1917, for example, she wrote her aunt, Elizabeth Upjohn Babcock, with whom she had been living before departing for Europe. Posted from London while she was waiting for permission to enter France, the letter described Upjohn's work as a volunteer in an Army canteen serving soldiers who, she wrote, were "full of fun and always cheerful", whether they were new recruits or recently returned from the front. When the United States entered the war, Upjohn began reporting for Current History, a New York Times magazine founded in 1914 to provide news about the war. Her first article, "Life in France in Wartime", was a long and quite detailed account of conditions in London and Paris. It mainly concerned the difficulties faced by the widows of French soldiers and their children, with whom she was then working as a volunteer.

After she joined the Junior Red Cross, Upjohn greatly reduced her contributions to other publications. In 1925, she contributed an illustrated article to a magazine called Asia mainly about mothers and their children in the Malay Archipelago. A year later, she wrote and illustrated a story in a book for children called The Pathway to Reading (Silver, Burdett and Company, New York, 1926). Called "The Truce", it concerned two Albanian boys who circumvented a blood feud between their families by declaring a permanent truce. In 1921, Junior Red Cross News published a piece by Upjohn that proved to be fairly typical of her contributions to that magazine. Called "How Santa Came to a Dutch Boat", it used an account of children's gift giving to describe Christmas traditions in the Netherlands. In 1927, Houghton Mifflin published an illustrated collection of her stories entitled Friends in Strange Garments about the children she had met and sketched during her extensive travels on behalf of the Red Cross. The illustration entitled "An Albanian Story-Teller", shown above, Image No. 13, is one of the full-color pictures in the book.

== Relief worker ==
Caught in Paris when war was declared, Upjohn chose to volunteer as a relief worker at an Episcopalian church rather than sailing back home. In August 1914, she responded to a call for help from Dr. Samuel Watson, Rector of the American Church in Paris, who had begun to care for the first of the war's refugees. After directing relief efforts within the church, Watson was named head of the Distribution Committee of the American Relief Clearing House, an organization set up in late in 1914 to distribute funds, clothing, and other forms of aid coming in from America. After her return to the United States in 1915, she exhibited drawings of refugees at the Ralston Gallery in New York and donated proceeds from her sales to the Secours National Fund for the Relief of Civilian War Sufferers in France. In 1916, she returned to France to work on behalf of the Fund for War Devastated Villages of France which distributed food and clothing to needy families. In 1917 and 1918, Upjohn worked in Paris as a volunteer inspector for an organization known as Fraternité Américaine, an organization formed to provide relief to the French children whose fathers had been killed in the war. Based in New York, this organization had Dr. Watson as its vice president. In the United States, it was usually called Fatherless Children of France. In January 1918 she explained her role as visiting the homes of widows to determine "the health and general condition of the children, whether the mothers have work and of what nature, and to give some account of their surroundings." During this time, she continued working with the Fund for War Devastated Villages and in 1918 received a formal decoration from the French government for, as one account put it, "her work in helping to evacuate villages in the Canton of Rosieres, near Montdidier, Somme. In Rosieres, the Fund for Devastated Villages worked closely with the American Red Cross which had, by that time, established a well-funded organization for civilian relief services based in Paris. In September 1918, Upjohn joined the Red Cross Civilian Relief Agency and was made director of its operations in the Aube department of France. Soon thereafter, the Red Cross commission in Paris convinced Upjohn that she could accomplish more good through her art than through her volunteer relief work. As a Red Cross report later put it, "she acquiesced, although insisting that she regarded sketching and painting as a pleasure and felt that the war called for a more direct and personal service."

== Personal life and family ==
Upjohn was born on October 31, 1868, in Dover, New Jersey. Her father, James Atchison Upjohn, was then rector of St. John's Protestant Episcopal Church in that city. Her mother, Maria Louisa Mills Upjohn, suffered from diabetes and died, aged 49, in 1889 when Upjohn was 20. Upjohn's paternal grandfather was Richard Upjohn, a well-known architect. Her father's brother, Richard Mitchell Upjohn, was also an architect.

Upjohn's siblings were Doane Upjohn, an Episcopalian minister in Wisconsin and Iowa, Richard Upjohn, an architect, Charles Mills Upjohn, James Upjohn, Charlotte Louisa Upjohn, and Elizabeth Ann Upjohn, who was a well-known nursing administrator and the wife of a founding member of the American Institute of Architects named Charles Babcock.

Upjohn attended Kemper Hall, a private boarding school for girls in Kenosha, Wisconsin, and graduated in 1887. During the years in which she received art training in New York and the cities of Western Europe, she shared apartments in Manhattan with her friend Augusta van Benschoten and the two traveled together in Europe. When van Benschoten died in 1935, Upjohn was the principal beneficiary of her large estate, receiving an annuity interest in $5,000 (a value of approximately $100,000 85 years later). During the second decade of the twentieth century, Upjohn lived in Ithaca, home of her sister, Elizabeth.

Upjohn traveled frequently throughout her life. Although her legal residences in the United States changed frequently, she tended, when not traveling, to reside in Ithaca, New York; Manhattan, or Washington, D.C. During the last few years of her life, she lived in New Milford, Connecticut with her cousin, Emma Tyng Upjohn (1868-1952).

There is evidence that Upjohn was called Milo within the family, presumably to avoid being confused with her cousin (and Emma Upjohn's sister), Anna Mitchell Upjohn (1864-1942).

Upjohn died on December 4, 1951, in New Milford, Connecticut.
