= Marybeth =

Marybeth is a given name. Notable people with the name include:

- Marybeth Byrd, American contestant on American Idol season 21
- Marybeth Daucher, American biologist
- Marybeth Davis (born c. 1952), American nurse convicted of the murders of her two children in 1997
- Marybeth Fama (born 1965), American young adult author, best known for her book Monstrous Beauty
- Marybeth Gasman, American Samuel DeWitt Proctor Endowed Chair in Education & a Distinguished Professor at Rutgers University
- Marybeth Linzmeier (born 1963), American former competition swimmer who represented the United States
- Marybeth Peil (born 1940), American actress and soprano
- Marybeth Peters (born 1939), American attorney, 11th United States Register of Copyrights
- Marybeth Redmond, American politician in the Vermont House of Representatives
- Marybeth Sant-Price (born 1995), American track and field sprinter
- Marybeth Tinker, American free speech activist
- Marybeth Tinning (born 1942), American serial killer
- Marybeth Yuen Maul (1925–2010), American woman who was the first Asian-American female magistrate in Hawaii

== Fictional characters ==
- Marybeth Dunston, in the US slasher horror film series Hatchet (film series), played by Tamara Feldman and Danielle Harris
- Marybeth Hutchinson, in the sci-fi horror film The Faculty, played by Laura Harris
