= Jeanne Simon =

Jeanne Simon may refer to:

- Jeanne Hurley Simon (1922–2000), state and national public official, first wife of Senator Paul Simon
- Jeanne Simon (artist) (1869–1949), French painter
