= Popea =

Popea is a Romanian surname. Notable people with the surname include:

- Elena Popea (1879–1941), Romanian painter
- Nicolae Popea (1826–1908), Romanian Austro-Hungarian bishop, uncle of Elena
