= Daucher =

Daucher is a surname. Notable people with the surname include:

- Hans Daucher (1486–1538), German wood carver, sculptor, and medal designer
- Lynn Daucher (born 1946), American politician
- Marybeth Daucher, American biologist

== See also ==
- Dauchez
- Gaucher
