= Helena Sturtevant =

American artist

- Born: August 19, 1872; Middletown, Rhode Island
- Died: 1946 (aged 73–74); Newport, Rhode Island
- Known for: Painting

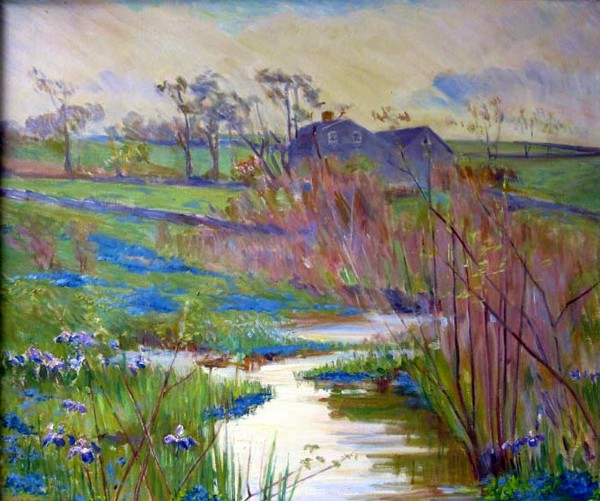
untitled

Helena Sturtevant (1872-1946) was an American painter.

== Biography ==
Sturtevant was born in Middletown, Rhode Island on October 13, 1863. She attended the School of the Museum of Fine Arts, Boston and the Académie Colarossi. Her teachers included Edmund C. Tarbell, Lucien Simon, and Jacques-Émile Blanche. She exhibited her work at the Art Institute of Chicago, and the Paris Salon. She was a member of the American Artists Professional League, the American Federation of Arts, the College Art Association, the International Society of Arts and Letters, the National Association of Women Painters and Sculptors, and the Newport Art Association.

Sturtevant died in Newport, Rhode Island in 1946.
