= Bernard Lamotte =

French painter (1903–1983)

Bernard Lamotte (1903 – September 28, 1983) was a Paris-born artist, illustrator, painter, and muralist. He attended the École des Beaux-Arts at the Sorbonne and studied under Bernand Corman and Lucien Simon (1861–1945). From 1932 to 1935, he traveled to Tahiti and New York and in 1935 he moved to New York City to pursue his art.

== Style and works ==
Lamotte's travels inspired his works, as demonstrated by his cityscapes of Paris, New York, and Tahiti. Lamotte beautifully captured modern day Parisian city life and street scenes. Lamotte's style is reminiscent of other artists of the School of Paris, modern with a flair for the romantic. His technique gives his oil paintings a look and texture of a watercolor.

While in New York between travels to Tahiti and Paris, within one year of his arrival Lamotte received several mural commissions including and exhibitions including a solo show at the Wildenstein Gallery. Other exhibits included the Art Institute of Chicago in 1941, the Carstairs Gallery in New York City annually from 1941–1950s, and a solo show at the Palm Beach Gallery in 1965. Like Pierre Sicard and Grigory Gluckmann, Lamotte was represented by the Dalzell-Hatfield Gallery in Los Angeles, which had an exhibition in 1975.

Lamotte also created a mural of Christiansted Harbor on St. Croix, Virgin Islands for the White House pool for John F. Kennedy, which is now preserved in the John F. Kennedy Library and Museum, Boston. Other commissions include businesses, restaurants corporations, private collectors, and theatre design.

Lamotte was also an illustrator for numerous fashion magazines. In 1945 an illustrated book published on Lamotte entitled, Bernard Lamotte, Oil Painting and Brush Drawing, was written by Louis Gauthier and in 1948 his work was reviewed in Time magazine.

Museum collections of Lamotte's work include the Tokyo Museum, Luxembourg Museum, Musee d’Art Moderne in Paris, and the French Embassy in Finland. Private collections include Joseph P. Kennedy, Alfred Barnes, and Anton Dalhuijsen, among several others.

The Vose Gallery of Boston has hosted several exhibitions from his estate.

== New York City residence ==
Lamotte's atelier was located above what is now La Grenouille restaurant where fellow expatriate French artists and famed New York personalities congregated, including Greta Garbo, Charlie Chaplin, and Marlene Dietrich. The studio he and his wife shared became a bohemian haven and was coined, Le Bocal ("The Fishbowl").

== Friendship with Antoine de Saint-Exupéry ==
Antoine de Saint-Exupéry met Lamotte in art school in France, and in the early 1940s spent a great deal of time in Lamotte's New York City studio at 3 East 52nd Street, called Le Bocal. It was one of the places where Saint-Exupéry worked on Le petit prince. Lamotte also created the illustrations for Flight to Arras by Antoine de Saint-Exupéry.

== Personal life ==
Lamotte was born and educated in Paris. He had been bedridden for some time as a child due to an injury and spent his time studying the color and textures of the cityscape below his window, which would greatly influence his artistic style and passion.

After years of travel, Bernard became an American citizen in 1951. He married Lilyan White Kent, a painter and sculptor, who was the widow of Twentieth Century Fox president Sidney R. Kent. She introduced him to such stars as Marlene Dietrich, Charlie Chaplin, and Greta Garbo.

Bernard died in 1983 at age 80 from complications from surgery at St. Luke's Hospital in Manhattan.
