= Patrick Bakker =

Dutch painter (1910–1932)

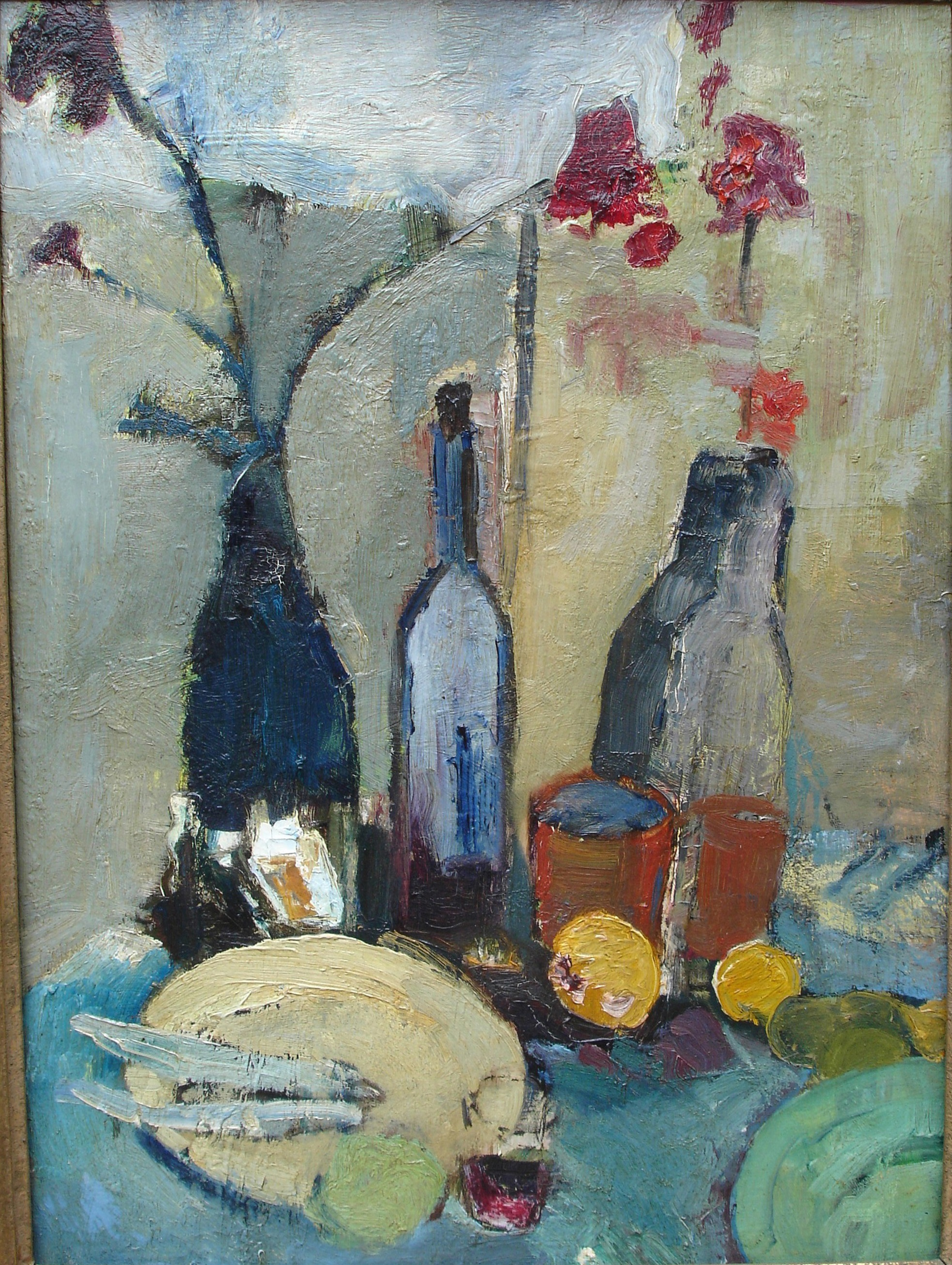
De scheve fles (the Tilted Bottle), 1932 : il on canvas, 48 x 66 cm, private coll.

Patrick Bakker (12 November 1910 in Apeldoorn, the Netherlands – 28 December 1932 in Amsterdam) was a Dutch artist in oil paintings and pen or pastel drawings in the first half of the twentieth century. At the time of his death he was considered a "prodigy", in the words of Bénézit's Dictionnaire. Despite his short life, he left a large collection of works characterized by an expressive freedom in his use of colour, confident draughtsmanship, and controlled impetuosity. The art critic Abraham Marie Hammacher spoke highly of him in Stromingen en persoonlijkheden : schets van een halve eeuw schilderkunst in Nederland, 1900–1950 (p. 140).

== Biography ==
Patrick Bakker grew up in a cultured and well-to-do environment with many connections in the European art world, which strongly encouraged his early vocation. In his youth, he travelled extensively in the Netherlands as well as abroad (France, England, Germany, later Venice and Vienna), where he admired architecture, visited museums, practised his art and befriended a wide variety of people of all ages and backgrounds. In 1928, he left school before his finals and went to Amsterdam to work, first with Geert Grauss, then in 1929, (after a long illness), with Martin Monnikendam. In September 1931, despite his delicate health, he settled in Paris, studying first at the Académie Julian and Académie Colarossi, then, from Spring 1932 onwards, in Lucien Simon's studio at the École des Beaux-Arts. He met many French and foreign artists who lived in the French capital at that time, including André Lhote, Fernand Léger, Conrad Kikkert and Piet Mondrian. There was a time when he spent every Sunday with Jacques-Émile Blanche, who also painted his portrait. He was also close to the young David Ogilvy and spent much time with the Russian émigré community. It was in fact with the Troubetskoy family, who were lent an outbuilding at the Château de l’Etoile, in the Touraine region, that Patrick Bakker was to live his last few weeks of creativity, during the summer of 1932, from which he brought back a series of remarkably fine ink drawings. In the autumn of that year he fell ill again and went for a rest with his family in Hilversum. He barely had the time to organise his first personal exhibition in Amsterdam when he went into hospital and died a month later at the age of twenty-two.

== Work ==
Over three years as Patrick Bakker gained mastery, he developed stylistic diversity according to the medium he was using.

Painting : His oil paintings and pastels are especially striking for their sense of colour. During the same years in which Dutch artists like Dick Ket, Raoul Hynckes or Pyke Koch were aiming at casting rough, mysterious or dream-like images into an impeccable, yet somewhat frozen workmanship, Patrick Bakker remained attached to the ideals of high art and a sensual, expressive, even expressionist technique. His subjects are traditional – nudes, portraits, still-lives and landscapes – yet he portrayed them with continual colour experiments. This is, probably, his most personal contribution to painting. Whereas the German expressionists or the Dutch painters of the De Ploeg movement (except perhaps George Martens) liked to use primary colours, Patrick Bakker, whilst staying clear of any hint of impressionism, cultivated bitter-sweet and dissonant juxtapositions, introducing often deliberately dirty hues, with a controlled violence of expression.

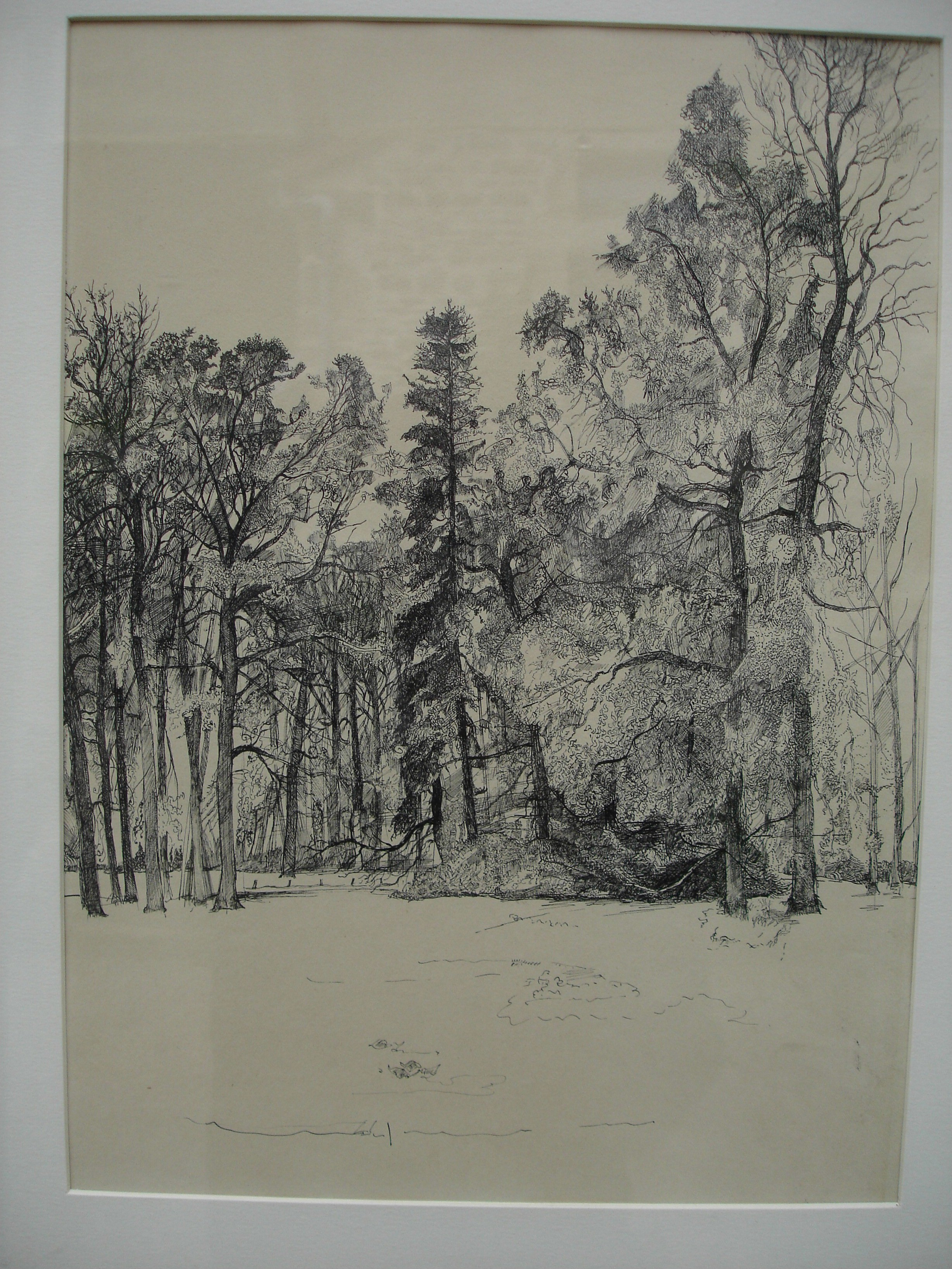
Trees at Nieuw-Amelisweerd, 1931 : ink on paper, 26 x 35 cm, private coll.

Drawing: His ink drawings were often characterized by a more delicate and draughtsmanly approach: his later views of French and Dutch landscapes contrast detailed renderings against large areas of blank space.

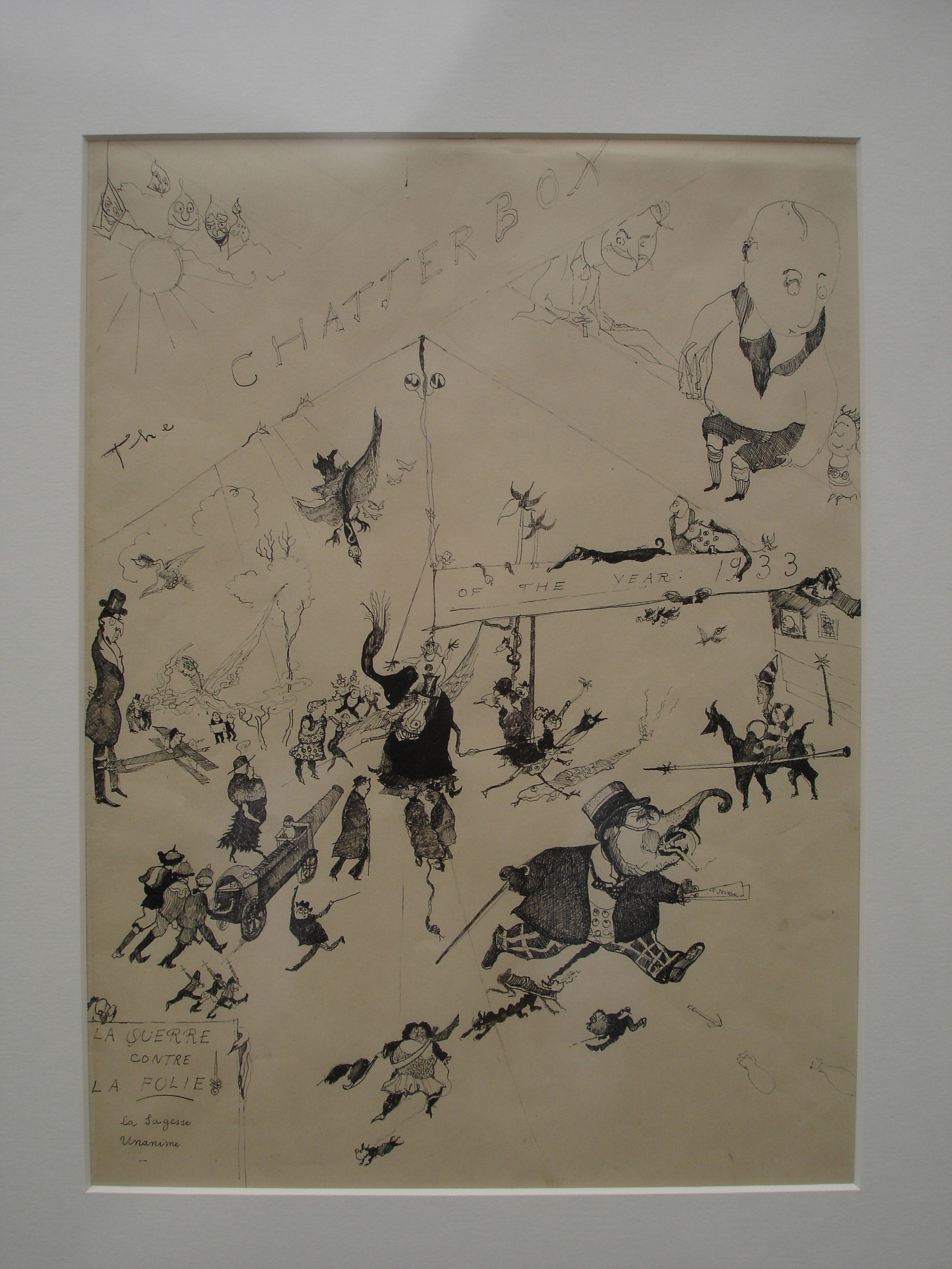
The Chatterbox of the year 1933, cover project, 1931 : ink on paper, 27 x 37 cm, private coll.

Beginning in childhood and continuing alongside his career, Bakker maintained a habit of drawing caricatures, doodles and illustrations. Even his poems and texts, though strictly for private use, were carefully bound together by him and illustrated with imaginative scribbles, often swarming with fantastical figures and silhouettes.

== Exhibitions ==
Patrick Bakker only exhibited once during his lifetime, in 1932, at Henri Cohen's Atelier voor Binnenhuiskunst. After his death, other exhibitions followed: at the J. Goudstikker gallery (1934), at the Boijmans Van Beuningen Museum (1936), at the Kunstzaal voor de Kunst in Utrecht (1938) and finally, after the war, at the Van Abbe Museum of Eindhoven (1958/1959). Apart from a portrait that entered the Boijmans Museum's collection after the 1936 exhibition, the rest of his work remains in private hands, mainly with descendants of the Bakker family. Only his ink drawings and oil paintings were ever exhibited; his poems and imaginative doodles and cartoons remain, to this day, unknown to the public.

== Bibliography ==
- (in Dutch) Abraham Marie Hammacher, Stromingen en persoonlijkheden : schets van een halve eeuw schilderkunst in Nederland, 1900-1950 [" Tendencies and personalities : sketches from half a century of painting in The Netherlands, 1900-1950"], G.M. Meulenhoff, Amsterdam, 1955
- (in French) Emmanuel Bénézit (dir.), Dictionnaire critique et documentaire des peintres, sculpteurs, dessinateurs et graveurs de tous les temps et tous les pays, [« Critical and documentary dictionary of painters, sculptors, draughtsmans and engravers of all times and all places »], new ed., Gründ, Paris, 1999, 14 vol.
- (in French) Robert Maillard (dir.), René Huyghe (pref.), Dictionnaire universel de la peinture [« Universal dictionary of painting »], Le Robert, Paris, 1975, 6 vol.
