= Lucien Simon =

French painter and teacher (1861–1945)

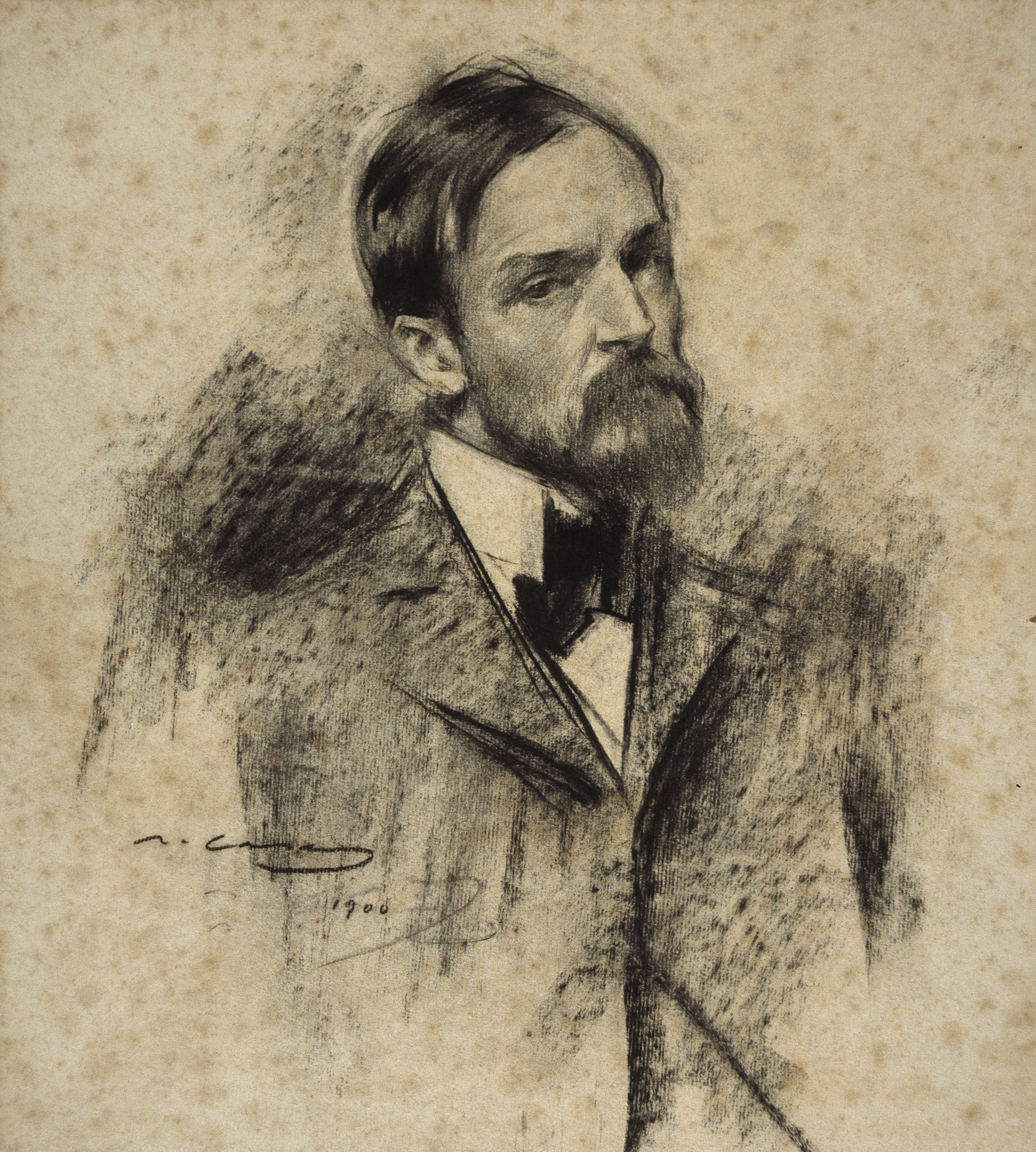
- Born: Lucien Joseph Simon; 18 July 1861; Paris, France
- Died: 13 October 1945 (aged 84); Combrit, France
- Education: Lycée Louis-le-Grand; Académie Julian
- Spouse: Jeanne Simon

Lucien Joseph Simon (1861 – 1945) was a French painter and teacher born in Paris.

== Early life and education ==
Simon was born in Paris. After graduating from the Lycée Louis-le-Grand, he studied painting at the studio of Jules Didier, then from 1880 to 1883 at l’Académie Julian.

== Career ==
He exhibited at the Salon des Artistes Francais from 1891, and at the Salon de la Société Nationale des Beaux-Arts.

In 1891, he married the painter Jeanne Dauchez, the sister of André Dauchez (1870–1948), and became infatuated with the scenery and peasant life of her native Brittany.

In 1895, he met Charles Cottet and became a member of his Bande noire or "Nubians", along with Dauchez, René-Xavier Prinet, Edmond Aman-Jean and Émile-René Ménard, employing the principles of Impressionism but in darker tones.

He was one of the founding teachers at Martha Stettler and Alice Dannenberg's Académie de la Grande Chaumière in 1902. He also taught at the Académie Colarossi around the same time, as well as taking private students.

He taught at École Nationale des Beaux-Arts from 1923 and elected to its Académie des Beaux-Arts in 1929, a position he held for 13 years.

In 1937 he won First Prize at "l’Exposition universelle de Paris" for his work on the Luxembourg pavilion.

Paul Simon (1892–1979), the son of Lucien and Jeanne (who was also a painter), was a noted animal sculptor.

A portrait of Lucien Simon, painted by Charles Cottet in 1907, hangs in the Musée d'Orsay in Paris.

He died in 1945 in Combrit. In 2002 there was an exhibition at the Galerie Philippe Heim in Paris devoted to the work of Paul, Lucien and Jeanne Simon.

== Selected paintings ==
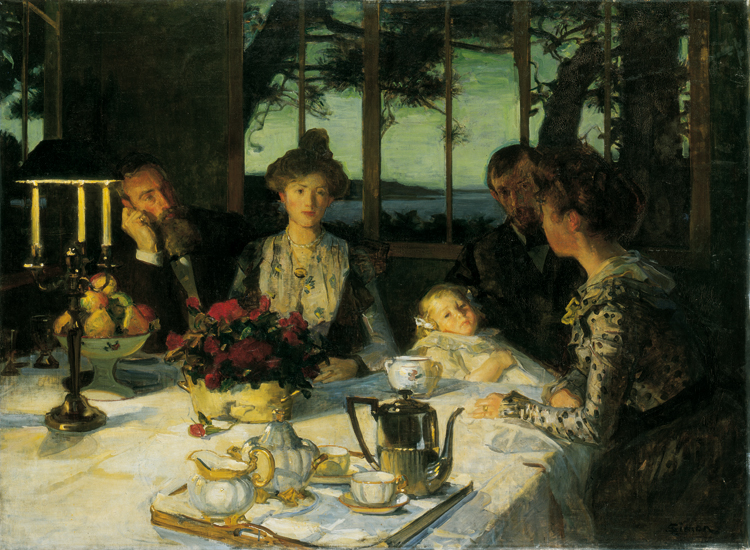
Fin de repas à Kergaït (1901)

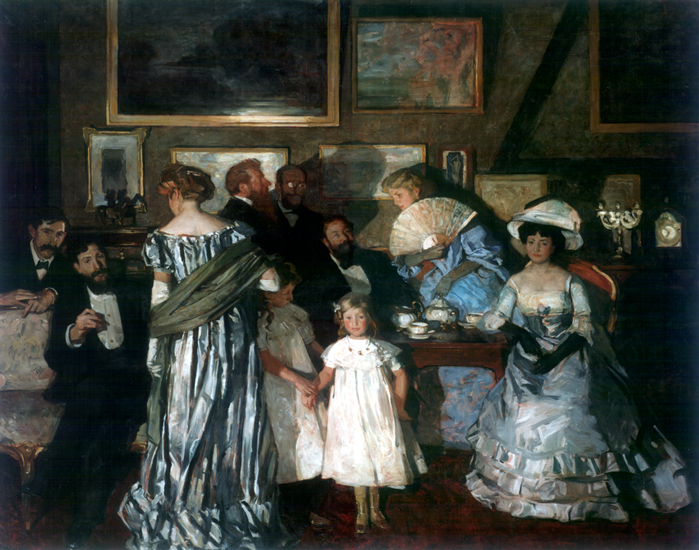
Soirée à l'Atelier (1904)

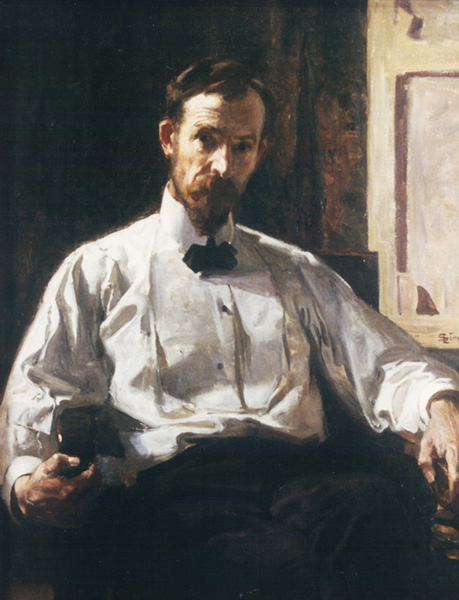
A self-portrait of 1908

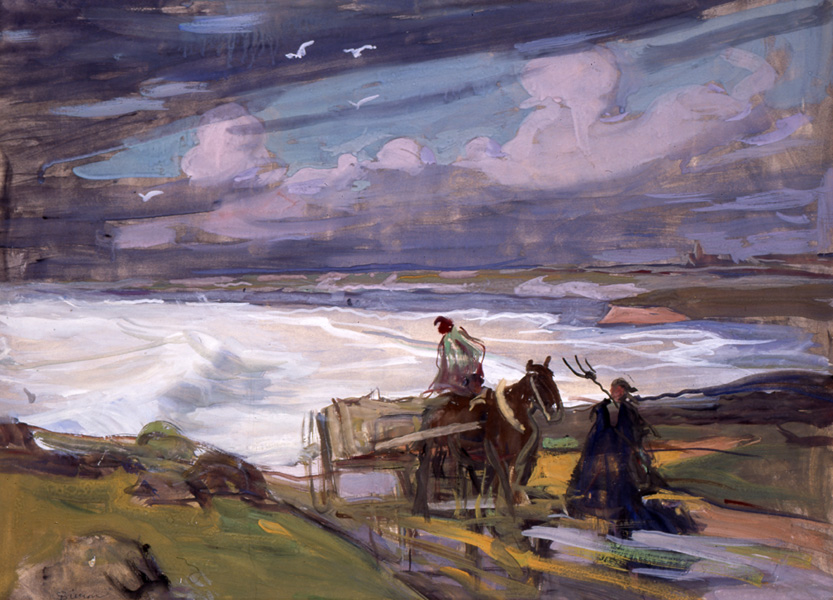
Le Ramassage du goémon (1924)

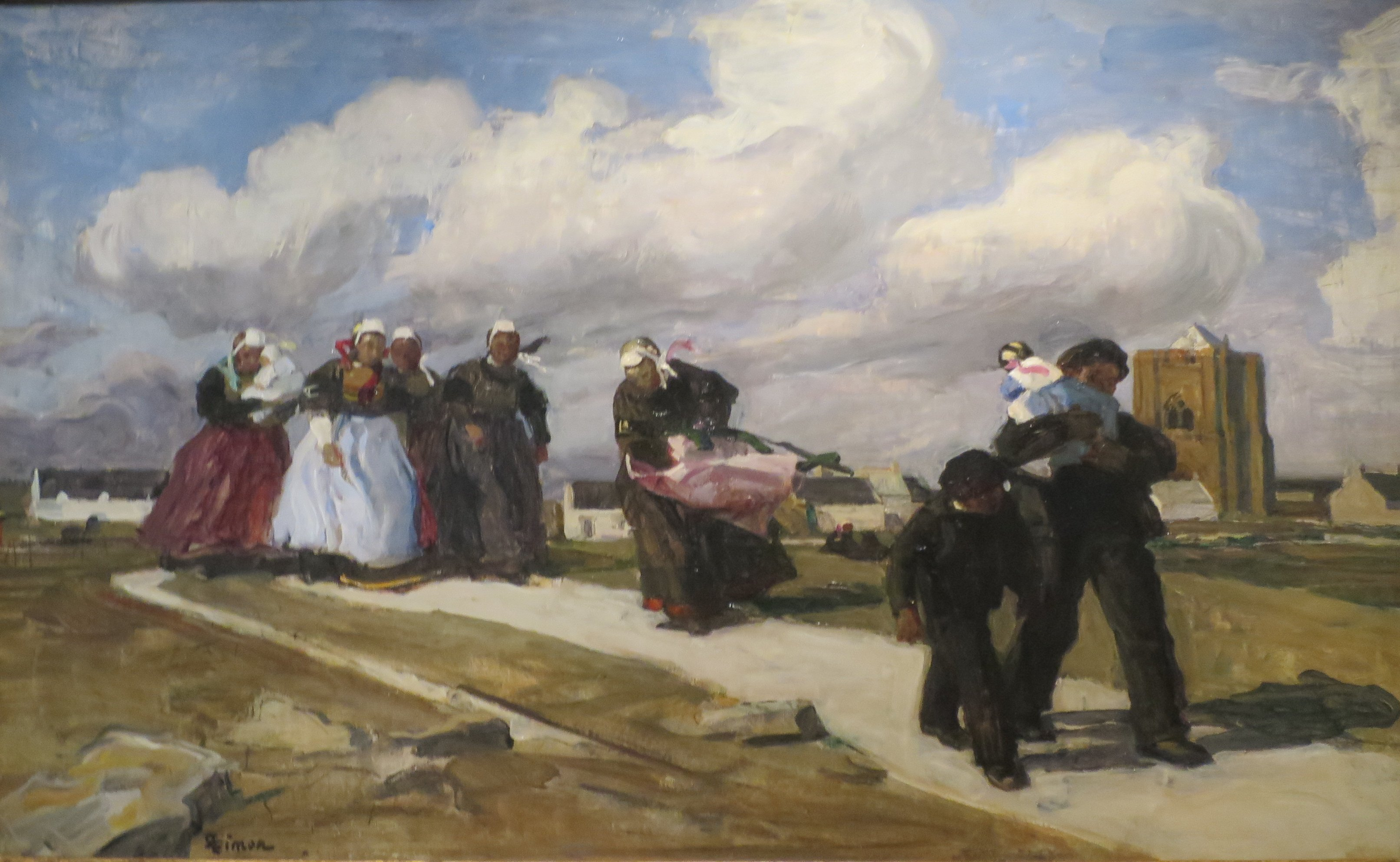
A Gust of Wind in the Pushkin Museum

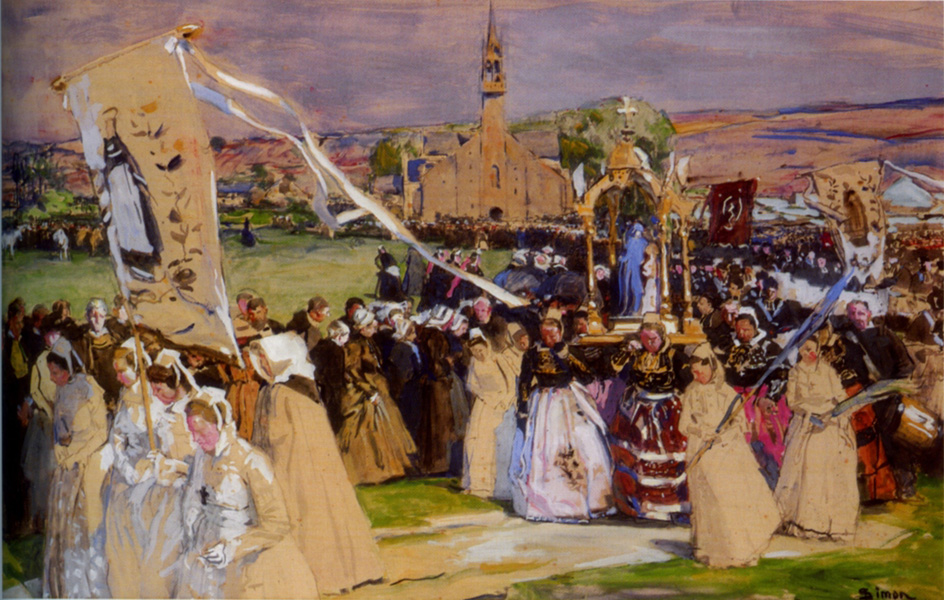
Procession au pardon de Sainte-Anne-la-Palud

== Notable students ==
- Frank Armington
- Rene Aubert
- Manuel Azadigian
- Patrick Bakker
- Yves Brayer
- A.M. Cassandre
- Grace Evelyn Chapman
- William H. Clapp
- Alice Dannenberg
- Bessie Davidson
- Lucille Douglass
- Jean Dries
- Lucien Fontanarosa
- Agnes Noyes Goodsir
- Victor Higgins
- Kamesuke Hiraga
- Edwin Holgate
- Yvonne Housser
- Robert Humblot (1907-1962)
- Henri Jannot (1909-2004)
- Friederike Koch-Langentreu (1866-1941)
- Lul Krag
- Bernard Lamotte
- Lowes Dalbiac Luard
- Florence Helena McGillivray
- Kay Nielsen
- Børge Christoffer Nyrop (1881-1948)
- Pan Yuliang
- Ambrose McCarthy Patterson
- Alfred Pellan
- Elenore Plaisted Abbott
- Elena Popea
- Steffi Reiner-Gartenberg (1885-1969)
- Mary Rogers
- Georges Rohner
- Manuel Ros (1882-1961)
- Amrita Sher-Gil
- Henry Simon
- Boris Smirnoff
- Martha Stettler
- Dorothy Stevens
- Helena Sturtevant (1872-1946)
- Mary Swanzy
- Sydney Thompson
- Marie Tuck
- Anna Milo Upjohn
- Martha Walter
- John Weygandt (1869-1951)
