= André Dauchez =

French painter (1870–1948)

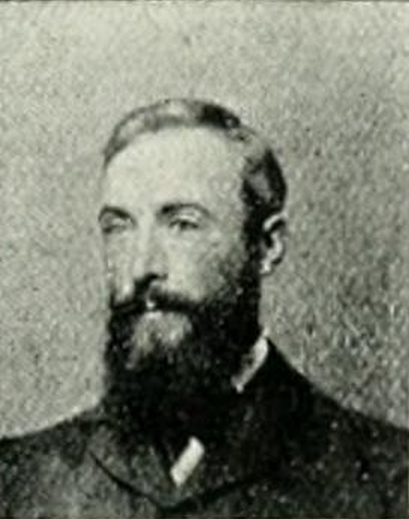
- Photographic portrait (before March 1900)
- Born: 17 May 1870; Paris, France
- Died: 15 May 1948 (aged 77)
- Education: Académie Julian
- Known for: Landscape paintings and etchings
- Spouse: Marie-Thérèse Le Liepvre
- Awards: Carnegie Prize

André Eugène Dauchez (17 May 1870 – 15 May 1948), born in Paris, was a French painter, watercolourist, pastellist, engraver, draughtsman and illustrator known for landscapes, waterscapes and seascapes.

== Biography ==
Born in a family of lawyers, his elder sister Jeanne would be an artist and André Dauchez showed early predispositions for graphic arts. His early influence was the works of Gustave Doré.

While pursuing his studies, he was encouraged in the way of art by his mother, who found Gaston Rodriguez, an artist-engraver who from 1885 to 1887 taught and educated the young man's ability to see and transcribe only the essential.

Dauchez never abandoned this mode of expression, handling with dexterity the technique of etching. In 1887, his teacher allowed him to present his work after a painting by Eugène Isabey at the Salon des Artistes français. It was the first success for the young man of seventeen who received the encouragements of his peers. Between the years 1887 and 1893 Dauchez continued working on etching and painting and further studied with Luc-Olivier Merson and at the Académie Julian.

The influence that nourished the engraved works of Dauchez was Rembrandt's work. Dauchez had led a comprehensive study of the master and learned the art of light and the importance of values of white and black in a landscape rendering.
He also studied Dutch landscape painter of the seventeenth century Jacob van Ruisdael, as well as some of his contemporaries and friends like Georges Gobo, Raoul André Ulmann, Albert Decaris, Charles Jouas, Pierre-Louis Moreau.

When his sister, Jeanne, married artist Lucien Simon, Dauchez was introduced to a circle of other artists like Émile-René Ménard, Edmond Aman-Jean, Charles Cottet, George Desvallières, Maurice Denis and above all discovered coastal Brittany and Cornouaille, the bay of Douarnenez, Belle-Île-en-Mer, Bénodet, the river Odet and the charm of the area. Dauchez was seduced by the lines and force of the landscape. From then on, he will dedicate his work to transcribe the many faces of the Finistère' Cornwall which inspired his best pieces.

Art critic André Chevrillon in Drogues et Peintures, Paris, 1940, describes the work of Dauchez as an "expressive and faithful portrait of Brittany". From the end of 1893, and for over half a century Dauchez found an inexhaustible source of inspiration in the landscapes of the Cornish coast: heath, dunes, villages, fishermen, estuaries and coves lined with pine trees, edges of coastline and rivers, rocks at low tide, open landscapes are his favorite motifs. He was an outdoor painter who described the effects on his soul of trees, stones, water and light. His works often present a cluster of trees, a trail, or a body of water, while in the background fades the rest of the composition with contrasts of light and shadow giving intensity to his work in a composition in which one feels life vibrating, transcribing the different effects of shade, sun or wind that alter the appearance of a landscape.

Dauchez' talent lies in landscape drawing allied to a subtle artistic sensibility.

== Collections ==
- Musée d’Orsay
- Chicago Art Institute
- Smithsonian American Art Museum
- Tokyo National Museum of Western Art
- Finnish National Gallery
- British Museum.

== Honors ==
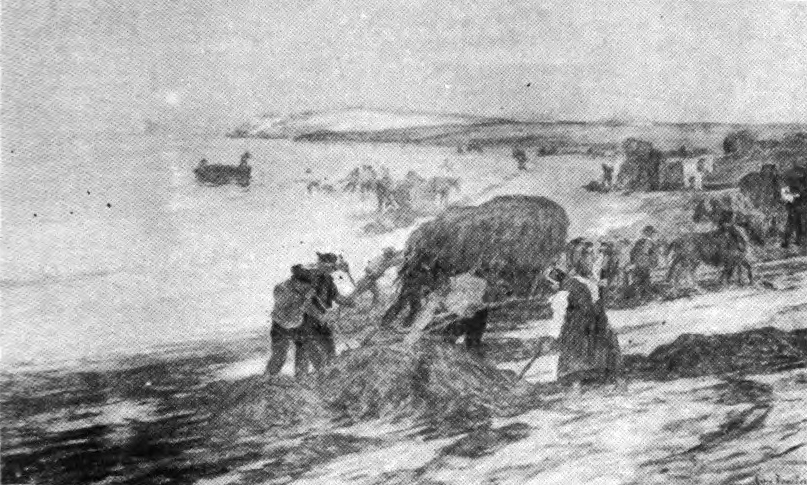
The Kelp Gatherers, winner of the 1900 Carnegie Prize

- 1900 - Silver medal from the Exposition Universelle (1900)
- 1900 - Carnegie Prize for The Kelp Gatherers, Pittsburgh, Pennsylvania
- 1911 - Dauchez is named knight of the Legion of Honour. He was named an officer in 1932.
- 1920 - Jury member at the Carnegie Institute Museum of Art, Pittsburgh, Pennsylvania
- 1922 - Appointed official painter of the Navy
- 1938 - Elected President of the Société Nationale des Beaux-Arts, succeeding Jean-Louis Forain
- 1938 - Elected member of the Academy of Fine Arts, engraving' section.

== Publication ==
- Notice sur la vie et les œuvres de Émile Brulant, Paris, Firmin-Didot, 1940
