= Helen Van Vechten =

American printer

- Born: Helen Gilbert; April 20, 1868; Mosinee, Wisconsin
- Died: July 3, 1949 (aged 81)
- Other names: Mrs. Helen Van Vechten, Helen Bruneau Van Vechten
- Occupation: printer

Helen Van Vechten (1868–1949) was an American printer who became known for the hand-printed fine press books she produced for the Philosopher Press in Wisconsin around the turn of the 20th century. In her day, she was one of very few women involved in fine book-making in America and was regarded as a top expert in the field.

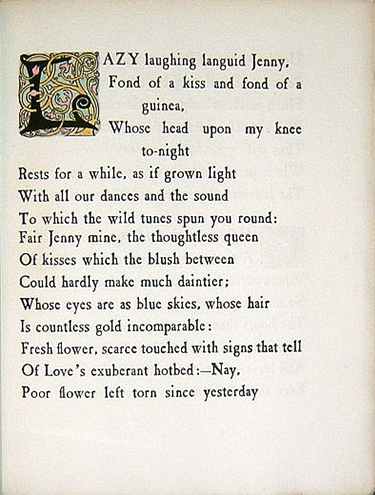
Page from the Philosopher Press's 1899 edition of Dante Gabriel Rossetti's long poem Jenny.

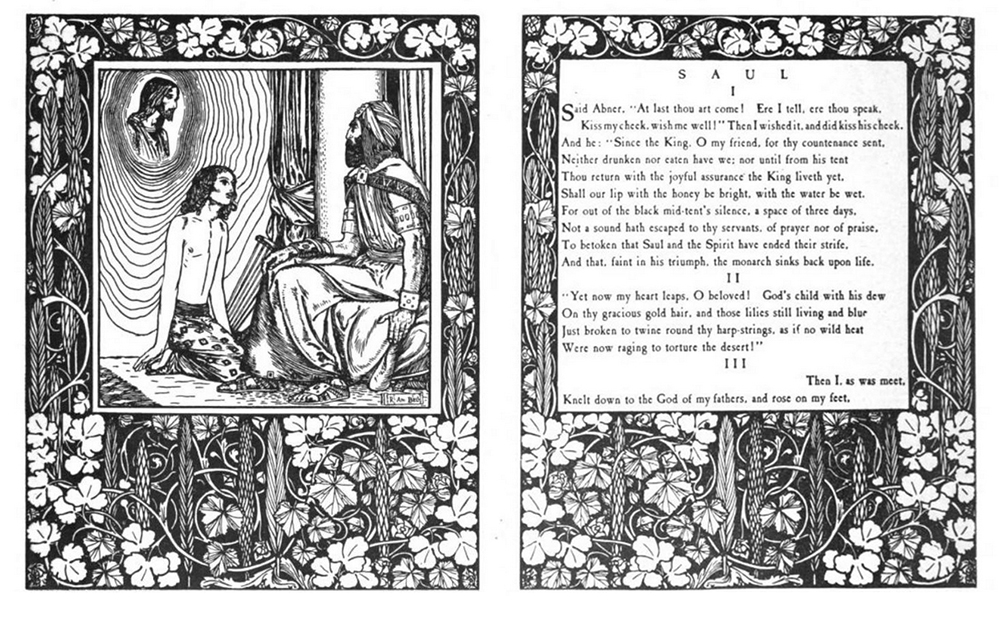
Two-page spread of Robert Browning's long poem Saul, from the Philosopher Press edition of 1904.

== Biography ==
Helen Gilbert was born in Mosinee, Wisconsin, on April 20, 1868, to Victina (Scriven) Gilbert and William Gilbert. Her father drowned when she was four and her mother later remarried, to a man named J.R. Bruneau, who adopted Helen. The family moved to Wausau, Wisconsin, where Helen mainly grew up.

Helen went to college in Milwaukee, married Philip V.O. Van Vechten, and returned to Wausau. In 1897, Phillip, who ran a lumber business, was invited to become a partner in a local print shop, the Philosopher Press, which put out fine-press editions of books. Van Vechten joined the firm and began by managing the bookkeeping and business correspondence. However, she was more interested in the printing side of things and in a short time learned the printer's trade. When Phillip shifted his focus to the lumber business, she took over most of the printing work. Philip's partner, a man named William Ellis, planted a pine tree nearby, and the press's books often gave the press's name in expanded form as "The Philosopher Press at the Sign of the Green Pine Tree."

Van Vechten became an expert in all aspects of book-making. She was an innovator on the technical side of printing, inventing a way to feed deckled paper through the press that would allow for perfectly registered printing on both sides of the page. This was something that most experts had thought impossible, and her achievement was remarked on in publications around the country.

Van Vechten was highly influenced by the Arts and Crafts movement and the hand-made aesthetic of William Morris and Britain's Kelmscott Press. Under Van Vechten's leadership, the Philosopher Press put out finely printed and bound limited editions of works by such popular authors as Samuel Johnson, Robert Louis Stevenson, Ralph Waldo Emerson, Robert Browning, Dante Gabriel Rossetti, and Alfred Lord Tennyson. The Arts and Crafts influence is particularly evident in Van Vechten's extensive use of stylized floral decorations and illuminated capital letters. Van Vechten's books—many of which she signed—were (and still are) widely admired for their quality.

Van Vechten was also involved in the press's monthly literary journal, The Philosopher, which ran from 1897 to 1906. Among the authors published in the journal were Zona Gale and Elia W. Peattie.

Van Vechten died of a heart attack on July 3, 1949. Her papers are held by the Wisconsin Historical Society Archives.

== Partial list of Philosopher Press editions ==
- A Ballad of Doing Well, by Charles Floyd McClure (1900)
- A Lodging for the Night, by Robert Louis Stevenson (1900)
- Elaine, by Alfred Lord Tennyson (1901?)
- Fifty Rubaiyat of Omar Khayyam, translated by Richard Le Gallienne (1901?)
- Half Hours, by D. Ostrander, illuminated by Minnie Ostrander Mylrea (1899)
- In Defense of Judas, by William Wetmore Story (1902; originally A Roman Lawyer in Jerusalem)
- Jenny, by Dante Gabriel Rossetti (1899)
- Mezzotints, by Laura Cooke Barker (1900)
- Rasselas, by Samuel Johnson (1902)
- Saul, by Robert Browning (1902)
- Self-Reliance, by Ralph Waldo Emerson (1901)
- The Daniel Press, by Falconer Madan (1903?)
- The Second Version of the Translations by Edward FitzGerald from Rubáiyát of Omar Khayyám (1901)
