= Elena Popea =

Romanian Modernist painter

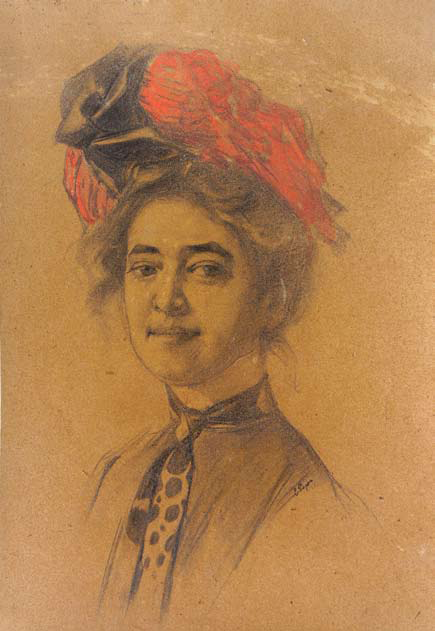
Self-portrait (date unknown)

Elena Popea (15 April 1879, Brașov – 19 June 1941, Bucharest) was an Austro-Hungarian-born Romanian Modernist painter whose influences included Impressionism, Expressionism and Cubism. Her favored subjects were landscapes, floral still-lifes and scenes of people at work or attending events.

== Biography ==
Her father was a secondary school teacher and her uncle was Bishop Nicolae Popea. Upon finishing her basic education, she studied philology in Leipzig and painting in Berlin. Later, she enrolled at the Münchner Künstlerinnenverein, an art school for women in Munich. After that, she spent some time at the artists' colony in Landsberg am Lech, where she took private lessons from Angelo Jank and Caroline Kempter.

Her début came in 1905 at the "Expoziția națională", organized by the Asociația Transilvană pentru Literatura Română și Cultura Poporului Român (ASTRA), in Sibiu. More exhibitions followed in Bucharest and Cluj.

During World War I, she lived in Paris, where she had showings at the Galerie nationale du Jeu de Paume and the Salon des indépendants. While there, she continued her studies with Lucien Simon. In 1922, she returned to Paris to study with André Lhote at his new academy in Montparnasse.

She generally spent her summers painting in the vicinity of Brașov or Cluj, and the rest of the year travelling; wandering as far afield as Scandinavia, Scotland, Spain and the Middle East, with each trip resulting in a new series of canvases.

== Selected paintings ==
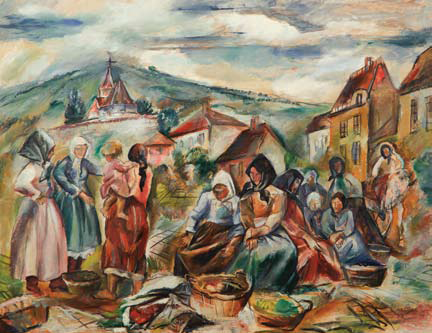
Fair in Transylvania

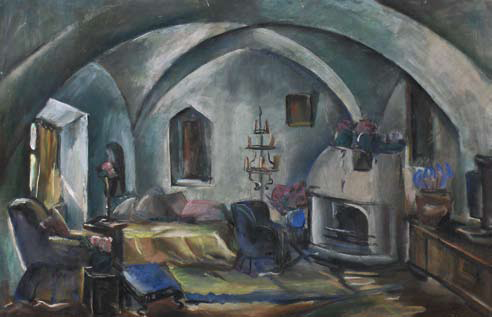
Interior of Bran Castle

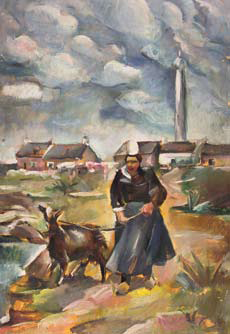
Woman with Goat

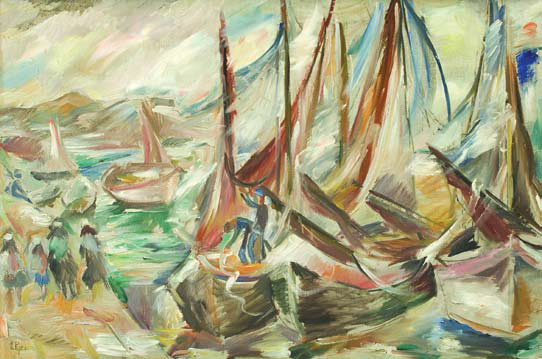
Boats
