= Marybeth Daucher =

American biologist

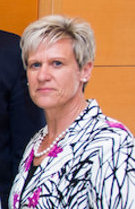
- Daucher in 2017
- Born: Mary Elizabeth Daucher
- Education: George Washington University
- Scientific career
- Workplaces: National Institute of Allergy and Infectious Diseases
- Thesis: Virological outcome after structured interruption of antiretroviral therapy for HIV infection is associated with the functional profile of virus- specific CD8T cells (2007)
- Doctoral advisor: Daniel Douek

Mary Elizabeth Daucher is an American biologist serving as the acting chief of the vaccine production program laboratory at Vaccine Research Center of the National Institute of Allergy and Infectious Diseases.

== Life ==
Daucher completed a Ph.D. in the department of genetics at the George Washington University Columbian College of Arts and Sciences in May 2007. Her dissertation was titled Virological outcome after structured interruption of antiretroviral therapy for HIV infection is associated with the functional profile of virus- specific CD8T cells. Daucher's doctoral advisor was Daniel Douek.

Daucher is the acting chief of the vaccine production program laboratory at the Vaccine Research Center of the National Institute of Allergy and Infectious Diseases (NIAID). Her areas of research include vaccine process design and development, regulatory strategy, and translational program management.

== Selected works ==
- Graziosi, C.; Gantt, K. R.; Vaccarezza, M.; Demarest, J. F.; Daucher, M.; Saag, M. S.; Shaw, G. M.; Quinn, T. C.; Cohen, O. J.; Welbon, C. C.; Pantaleo, G. (1996). "Kinetics of cytokine expression during primary human immunodeficiency virus type 1 infection". Proceedings of the National Academy of Sciences. 93 (9): 4386–4391. Bibcode:1996PNAS...93.4386G. doi:10.1073/pnas.93.9.4386. ISSN 0027-8424. PMC 39547. PMID 8633076.
- Weissman, Drew; Dybul, Mark; Daucher, Mary Beth; Davey, Jr., Richard T.; Walker, Robert E.; Kovacs, Joseph A. (2000). "Interleukin-2 Up-Regulates Expression of the Human Immunodeficiency Virus Fusion Coreceptor CCR5 by CD4 + Lymphocytes In Vivo". The Journal of Infectious Diseases. 181 (3): 933–938. doi:10.1086/315303. ISSN 0022-1899. PMID 10720515.
- Kinter, Audrey L.; Hennessey, Margaret; Bell, Alicia; Kern, Sarah; Lin, Yin; Daucher, Marybeth; Planta, Maria; McGlaughlin, Mary; Jackson, Robert; Ziegler, Steven F.; Fauci, Anthony S. (2004). "CD25+CD4+ Regulatory T Cells from the Peripheral Blood of Asymptomatic HIV-infected Individuals Regulate CD4+ and CD8+ HIV-specific T Cell Immune Responses In Vitro and Are Associated with Favorable Clinical Markers of Disease Status". Journal of Experimental Medicine. 200 (3): 331–343. doi:10.1084/jem.20032069. ISSN 1540-9538. PMC 2211981. PMID 15280419.
