= Jeanne Simon (artist) =

French painter (1869–1949)

- one of the few women in the painting by Courbet
- Born: March 17, 1869; Hôtel du 14 rue Saint-Guillaume
- Died: December 19, 1949 (aged 80); Paris
- Occupation: painter

Jeanne Simon or Jeanne Simon-Dauchez (March 17, 1869 – December 19, 1949) was a French painter.

== Life ==
Simon was born at Hôtel du 14 rue Saint-Guillaume in Paris in 1869. She was the daughter of Claire (born Thirial) and Fernand Dauchez (1842–1914) who was a lawyer in Paris. A sibling of nine children, she is followed by a brother André Dauchez (1870–1948), also a painter. Other siblings include Marcel (1872–1969) and Reine (1876–1941).

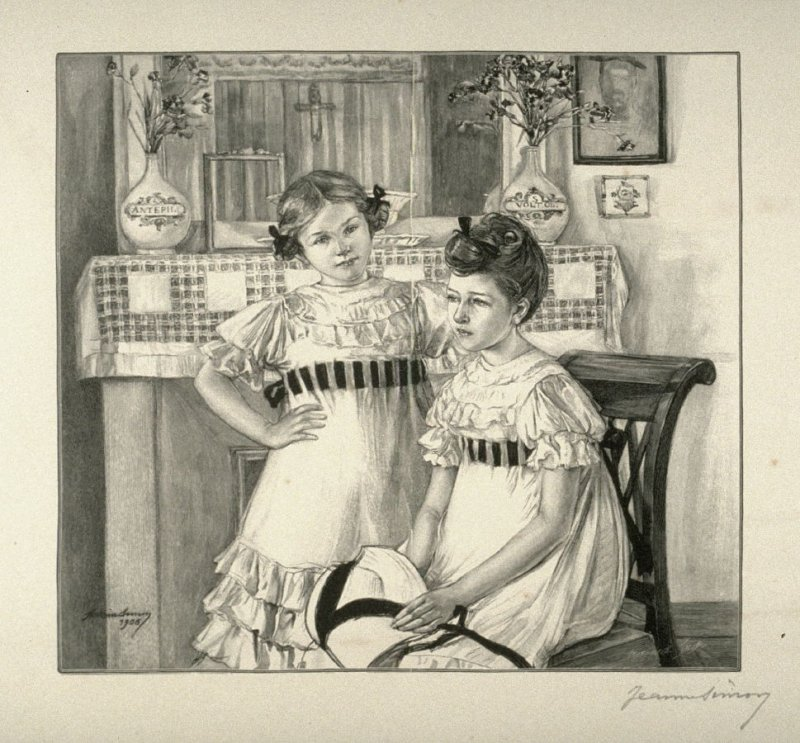
Jeanne Simon 1919 Portrait of two young girls

She married the painter Lucien Simon in 1891. They honeymooned to Venice . They will have four children: the sculptor Paul Simon (1892–1979), the artist-painter Charlotte Simon (1897–1994), Lucienne Simon (1898–1974) and Pauline Simon (born circa 1907).

She exhibited at the Salon des Artistes Français from 1899 to 1933. She also exhibited at Paris's Salon des Indépendants and in 1900 she received a bronze medal at the Exposition Universelle in Paris.

Simon died in Paris in 1949, her husband had died in 1945.

In 2002 there was an exhibition at the Galerie Philippe Heim in Paris devoted to the work of Paul, Lucien and Jeanne Simon.

== Public work ==
- Paris, Saint-Dominique church, Sainte-Catherine-de-Sienne chapel, four panels (painting on canvas), 1929–1935 :
  - The Childhood of Catherine, in a landscape of Siena;
  - Christ carrying his cross, near Saint Catherine towards whom he leans;
  - Landscape, animated by contemporary characters of the artist who represents members of her family, children and grandchildren, as well as herself;
  - Catherine looking after a plague victim
